= John Asher Dunn =

American linguist

John Asher Dunn (June 19, 1939 – July 4, 2017) was an American linguist who created the first academic dictionary and grammar of the Tsimshian language, an American Indian language of northwestern British Columbia and southeast Alaska.

In 1968, Dunn and his wife Luceen began fieldwork on the Tsimshian language in Kitkatla, British Columbia and Prince Rupert, B.C., under the supervision of the linguist Bruce J. Rigsby. He did follow-up fieldwork in Prince Rupert in 1971, in Metlakatla, Alaska, in 1972, and in Hartley Bay, B.C., in 1974, 1975, 1976, and 1978. This work involved designing the first modern, practical orthography for the language.

He published his dictionary and grammar of the Tsimshian language (now known as Sm'algyax) in 1978 and 1979 respectively. They were reissued in a single volume in 1995 by the Sealaska Heritage Foundation.

In the early 1990s he participated with Susan Marsden, Marie-Lucie Tarpent, Vonnie Hutchingson, and several Tsimshian language instructors in devising an updated Sm'algyax orthography in conjunction with producing the Teachings of Our Grandfathers book series for School District no. 52 of Prince Rupert, British Columbia.

He was a retired professor of linguistics at the University of Oklahoma in Norman, Oklahoma.

He was also the main proponent of the theory that the Tsimshianic languages (Sm'algyax and the Gitksan and Nisga'a languages) are a branch of the Indo-European language family.

== Bibliography ==
- Dunn, John Asher (1995) Sm'algyax: A Reference Dictionary and Grammar for the Coast Tsimshian Language. Seattle: University of Washington Press.
