= Kitasoo =

Tribe of Tsimshian people

The Kitasoo are one of the 14 tribes of the Tsimshian people in Canada, who inhabit, along with the Xai'xais, the village of Klemtu, British Columbia. The name Kitasoo derives from the Tsimshian name Gidestsu, from git- (people of) and disdzuu, which refers to a large, tiered house-depression. The Kitasoo, along with the Gitga'ata Tsimshians at Hartley Bay, B.C., are often classed as "Southern Tsimshian," their traditional language being the southern dialect of the Tsimshian language. Their band government is the Kitasoo/Xaixais First Nation, a member government of the Wuikinuxv-Kitasoo-Nuxalk Tribal Council.

The anthropologist Marius Barbeau recorded in 1947 that John Starr was of the "Klemtu" tribe and held the hereditary name Lagax'niitsk.

== Prehistoric culture ==
Some information is known about the lifestyle and diet of the prehistoric Kitasoo based upon archaeological recovery. For example, the Kitasoo exploited numerous flora and fauna as food sources including the Whitebark Raspberry, Rubus leucodermis.

== Bibliography ==
- Barbeau, Marius (1950) Totem Poles. 2 vols. (Anthropology Series 30, National Museum of Canada Bulletin 119.) Ottawa: National Museum of Canada.
- Miller, Jay (1981) "Moieties and Cultural Amnesia: Manipulation of Knowledge in a Pacific Northwest Coast Native Community," Arctic Anthropology, vol. 18, no. 1, pp. 23–32.
- Miller, Jay (1982) "Tsimshian Moieties and Other Clarifications," Northwest Anthropological Research Notes, vol. 16, no. 2, pp. 148–164.
