= Doreen Jensen =

Canadian artist

Doreen Jensen (May 13, 1933 – September 18, 2009), also known as Ha'hl Yee, was a Gitsxan elder, artist, carver, activist and educator.

== Biography ==
Born in Kispiox, British Columbia, in the House of Geel of the Fireweed Clan Jensen was "delivered by a medicine woman in her great-grandmother’s bedroom." She is the sister of Chief Walter Harris. Jensen’s "early training began in the oral history tradition, learning the language (Gitksan), songs, legends, and customs from her parents and grandparents. Her formal schooling began in a two-room day school in Kispiox. At the age of ten she left her family to attend Alberni Residential School for two years, returning to a newly integrated public high school in Prince Rupert. After leaving high school she returned to her home territory to work." Jensen attended the Gitanmaax School of Northwest Indian Design where she learned to carve under the tutelage of Tony Hunt and Henry Hunt.

She was a founding member of the ‘Ksan Village Association, the Society of Canadian Artists of Native Ancestry, [Lattimer], s chairperson with the Gitksan and Wet'suwet'en Vancouver Support Group and served on the board of trustees of the National Museum of Nature in Ottawa and Emily Carr University, among others. Jensen taught traditional art practices at Emily Carr University of Art + Design.

She featured in the National Film Board feature by Loretta Todd, Hands of History.

Jensen and her husband Vergil made their home in South Surrey, BC. Jensen had four children and four grandchildren.

== Gitxsan language ==
Jensen’s cousin Lonnie Hindle developed the phonetic system for the Gitxsan language with Bruce Rigsby, an American linguist. As a competent speaker, Jensen taught the language to children and adults including at classes at UBC.

== Exhibitions ==
In 1983, Jensen was the curator an exhibit at the Museum of Anthropology (MOA) titled Robes of Power which intended to "show the strength of Indian traditions, record how Indian women and men work together in the creative act of making a robe, demonstrate how these ceremonial/political robes of power, with their bold patterns and bright colours, may also be viewed as works of art, and draw attention to the presence of separate Indian identities within the framework of the modern nations-state called Canada." Robes of Power toured in Australia before appearing at the MOA.

In 1996, Jensen co-curated the Vancouver Art Gallery exhibition Topographies: aspects of recent BC art. "Jensen's interpretation of the carvings and weavings by First Nations artists is centered on how the concept of metamorphosis relates to time, space, place and being."

She was a contributor to Through My Eyes: Northwest Coast Artifacts at the Vancouver Museum in 1998.

== Publications ==
- 1986 - Robes of Power: Totem Poles on Cloth. The first major publication to focus on button blankets. Jensen directed royalties to the Kitanamax (Gitanmaax) School of Northwest Coast Arts.
- 1991 - Guest Editor, with Cheryl Brooks, of BC Studies A Celebration of Our Survival: The First Nations of British Columbia. [bell] 1991 #89
- 1996 – Topographies: aspects of recent BC art with Grant Arnold and Monika Gagnon

== Honours and awards ==
- 1992 UBC Honorary Doctorate of Letters
- 1993 Vancouver YMCA "Woman of Distinction" award
- Professional Native Women’s Association Golden Eagle Feather
- 2008 nomination BC Governor General Award
