= Coast Tsimshian dialect =

Tsimshianic language

Coast Tsimshian
- Sm'algya̱x
- Native to: Canada, United States
- Region: northwest British Columbia, southeast Alaska
- Ethnicity: 8,162 Tsimshian
- Native speakers: 210 in Canada, 3 in the United States (2021 census, 2020)
- Language family: Tsimshianic: Maritime Tsimshian; Coast Tsimshian
- Writing system: Latin script

Official status
- Official language in: Alaska

Language codes
- ISO 639-2: tsi
- ISO 639-3: tsi (with Sgüüx̣s)
- Glottolog: coas1300
- ELP: Sm̓algya̱x (Coast Tsimshian)
- Coast Tsimshian

- Tsimshian is classified as Critically Endangered by the UNESCO Atlas of the World's Languages in Danger.

- People: Ts’msyan
- Language: Sm'álgya̱x
- Country: La̱xyuubm Ts’msyen

Tsimshian, known by its speakers as Sm'algya̱x, is a dialect of the Tsimshian language spoken in northwestern British Columbia and southeastern Alaska. Sm'algya̱x means literally 'real or true language'.

The linguist Tonya Stebbins estimated the number of speakers of Tsimshian in 2001 as around 400 and in 2003 as 200 or fewer (see references below). Whichever figure is more accurate, Stebbins added in 2003 that most speakers were more than 70 years old and very few were under age 50. About 50 people out of an ethnic population of 1,300 Tsimshian in Alaska speak the language.

== Phonology ==
=== Vowels ===
Left columns are the IPA values of vowels, and right columns are the conventional orthography, taken from Dunn (1995, p. vi).

	Front		Back			
	Front		Unrounded		Rounded	
Close	i, ɪ	⟨i⟩	ɨ, ɯ	⟨ü⟩	u	⟨u⟩
Close-mid	e	⟨e⟩			o	⟨o⟩
Open-mid	ɛ	⟨e⟩	ʌ	⟨a̱⟩	ɔ	⟨o⟩
Open	a	⟨a⟩	ɑ	⟨a̱⟩		

Long vowels are indicated in the orthography with doubled letters, such as ⟨aa ee ii⟩. reported all vowels to have short and long pairs. According to Dunn, underlining ⟨a⟩ is optional for indicating /ɑ, ʌ/, and fluent speakers will usually omit it.

=== Consonants ===
First symbol is IPA, then the conventional orthography equivalent is given in brackets.

		Labial	Alveolar			Palatal	Velar			Uvular	Glottal
		Labial	plain	sibilant	lateral	Palatal	plain	pal.	labial	Uvular	Glottal
Plosive	voiceless	p	t	ts			k	kʲ ⟨ky⟩	kʷ ⟨kw⟩	q ⟨ḵ⟩	ʔ ⟨ʼ⟩
Plosive	ejective	pʼ ⟨pʼ⟩	tʼ ⟨tʼ⟩	t͡sʼ ⟨tsʼ⟩			kʼ ⟨kʼ⟩	kʲʼ ⟨kʼy⟩	kʷʼ ⟨kʼw⟩	qʼ ⟨ḵʼ⟩	
Plosive	voiced	b	d	dz			ɡ	ɡʲ ⟨gy⟩	ɡʷ ⟨gw⟩	ɢ ⟨g̲⟩	
Fricative				s (Note: Both John Asher Dunn and Franz Boas (as reported by A.C. Graf von der Schulenberg) find that the fricative /s/ has two variants: [s] or [ʃ].)	ɬ ⟨ł⟩					χ ⟨x⟩	h
Sonorant	plain	m	n		l	j ⟨y⟩	ɰ ⟨ẅ⟩ (Note: The velar glide /ɰ/ ⟨ẅ⟩ is a "w pronounced with lips unrounded".)		w		
Sonorant	glottalized	ˀm ⟨ʼm⟩	ˀn ⟨ʼn⟩		ˀl ⟨ʼl⟩	ˀj ⟨ʼy⟩	ˀɰ ⟨ʼẅ⟩		ˀw ⟨ʼw⟩		

The glottalization diacritic ⟨ ' ⟩ may be switched to the other side of a velar segment depending on whether it falls pre-, post- or intervocalically. In speech, glottalized segments before a vowel will result in simultaneous realization of both, [kʼ]. Glottalized segments that follow vowels produce the glottalization first, then the consonant closure, [ʼk]. Intervocalically, the glottalization depends on where the stress falls. [ʼk] is pronounced after a stressed syllable, and [kʼ] is pronounced before a stress.

=== Syllable structure ===
Tsimshian utilizes (C)CV or (C)CVC(C) syllable structures in which the vowels can occur long or short. Syllabic consonants are common and can technically occur anywhere within the word. The only consonants that qualify as syllabic (indicated optionally by underlining) are the sonorants /m/, /n/ and /l/ (and their glottalized counterparts). (Some writers will follow the Gitksan orthographic practice of writing the syllabic sonorants as /im/, /in/ and /il/.)

Examples:

- /hæj.mæː.dm/ "northeast wind"
- /n.læk/ "fireplace"
- /k’l.k’oːl/ plural of intransitive verb "dull"

Consonant clusters are common. Schulenberg reports finding /pt, pts, ptl, kts, qp, qtk, qtsc, qsk, nts, tɟ/ among many others, though only a smaller portion can occur in the rime. Note that these clusters do not contain syllabic consonants, but are only either in the onset or the coda. Clusters at the ends of words often have an epenthetic vowel inserted, which is usually /a/ [ʌ] but can also be either /i/ [ɪ] or /ɯ/ [ɯ].

Examples (with other phonological changes):

- /ɟelq/ → [ɟelaɢ] "outside"

t͡s* /æːlks/ → [æːliks] "servant"

- /ʌʔʌjæːɰx/ → [æːjæːwɯx] "Aurora Borealis, Northern Lights"

=== Vowel pitch ===
The long vowels of Tsimshian must be pronounced in one of three distinct ways: with a sustained pitch /eː/ → [eː]; a "falling pitch and offglide" /eː/ → [êə], or with the insertion of a glottal stop /eː/ → [eʔe]. In every day writing, the diacritical marks may be left out, so that the first two could be written ⟨ee⟩, whereas it is common to represent [eʔe].

Examples:

- (steady pitch) [kpiːl] "ten" (of abstract and round objects)
- (falling pitch) [nôsɯ] "wolverine"
- (glottal interruption) [χbæʔælʌ] "squall; storm from the south"

=== Stress ===
The primary stress generally falls on the last syllable of a word. In the case of a suffix or connective being added, then the stress falls on the penultimate syllable.

=== Phonological processes ===
There are a number of complex phonological processes that affect segments. The following is just a sample of some of the changes that may occur.

- Short vowels followed by /l/ often become long vowels with /l/-deletion.
  /wælp/ → /wæːp/ "house"
- Glottalized /k/ and /q/ between vowels are often shortened to just a glottal stop.
  /sɒk’æɬ/ → [sɒʔæɬ] "divide, settle an estate"
- At the ends of words /q/ may undergo lenition to /χ/.
  /iːmq/ → /imχ/ "beard"
- A short vowel may be lengthened if the primary stress falls on it.
  /χæ/ → /χæː/ "male slave"
- /l/ and /n/ may alternate in reduplication.
  /c’inˀæm/ → /c’ilc’inˀæm/ "give"
- Long vowels may become diphthongs. (Note: The existence of diphthongs is questionable. Schulenberg claims that Franz Boas "always heard the individual vowels pronounced separately." Dunn, however, seems to believe that younger speakers will realize a diphthong. There may have been a change in the pronunciation since Schulenberg's research in 1894 and Dunn's subsequent work starting in the 1968. In any event, diphthongs are rare.)
  /ɬoːl/ → /ɬoʊ̯l/ "push through the water"

== Orthography ==
In the practical orthography, uvulars are indicated by underlining the velar letters, ⟨ḵ g̲⟩, and the position of the apostrophe before or after the consonant letter distinguishes glottalization.

The Tsimshian orthography in use today is based on that developed by Tsimshianicists since the 1960s. It originally stems from Bruce Rigsby's work on the Gitksan language and includes John A. Dunn's work on Tsimshian and Marie-Lucie Tarpent's work on Nisga'a and Southern Tsimshian. Dunn, Tarpent, and Susan Marsden substantially revised it for School District No. 52 (Prince Rupert) when preparing the Suwilaay'msga Na Ga'niiyatgm, Teachings of Our Grandfathers book series in the early 1990s, with the blessing of the Tsimshian hereditary chiefs. Since then, the orthography and the recording of the language have largely been conducted by the Tsimshian Sm'algyax Authority. The Living Legacy Talking Dictionary provides both written and spoken samples of the language.

Another orthography, used only in Alaska, is taught by a private organization called Dum Baal-dum.

The conventional orthography supported by the Sm'algya̱x Language Authority:

Majuscule forms (also called uppercase or capital letters)
A	Aa	A̱	A̱a̱	B	D	Dz	E	Ee	G	Gw	Gy	G̱	H	I	Ii	K	K'	Kw	K'w	Ky	K'y	Ḵ	Ḵ'	L	'L	Ł	M	'M	N	'N	O	Oo	P	P'	S	T	T'	Ts	Ts'	U	Uu	Ü	Üü	W	'W	Ẅ	'Ẅ	X	Y	'Y	'
Minuscule forms (also called lowercase or small letters)
a	aa	a̱	a̱a̱	b	d	dz	e	ee	g	gw	gy	g̱	h	i	ii	k	k'	kw	k'w	ky	k'y	ḵ	ḵ'	l	'l	ł	m	'm	n	'n	o	oo	p	p'	s	t	t'	ts	ts'	u	uu	ü	üü	w	'w	ẅ	'ẅ	x	y	'y	'
IPA value
a	aː	ɑ~ʌ	ɑː~ʌː	b	d	ʣ	e~ɛ	eː~ɛː	ɡ	ɡʷ	ɡʲ	ɢ	h	i~ɪ	iː~ɪː	k	kʼ	kʷ	kʷʼ	kʲ	kʲʼ	q	qʼ	l	ˀl	ɬ	m	ˀm	n	ˀn	o~ɔ	oː~ɔː	p	pʼ	s	t	tʼ	t͡s	t͡sʼ	u	uː	ɯ~ɨ	ɯː	w	ˀw	ɰ	ˀɰ	χ	j	ˀj	ʔ

While provided in Dunn (1995), short ⟨ü⟩ and long ⟨a̱a̱⟩ have fallen into disuse and are generally not included in the modern alphabets. They are still listed in the table above for consistency.

== Morphology ==
Tsimshian can be classified as a polysynthetic language, although it is less so than other Native North American languages. Tense, for instance, is not marked with the verb, but always appears as a separate pre-verbal word. The verb stands out as the most important word in the sentence—much of the information can be expressed by affixing onto it. Nouns, however, do have a number of clitics that may be attached. There are multiple connectors that are suffixed or prefixed onto adjacent words which can create long strings of lexical items.

=== Forming the plural ===
==== Reduplication ====
Tsimshian has an extensive system of reduplication, which is used in most cases to form the plural of both nouns and verbs. There is a complex set of phonological processes that affect both the vowel and the consonant in reduplication. Schulenberg records at least 12 different classes of reduplication but Dunn later condenses these to just five, depending on which part of the word is copied, and whether it is prefixed, suffixed or infixed. However, each class contains irregular forms.

	Pattern	Example
Class I	/CVk-/	yexł 'spit (verb)' → yikyexł 'spit (plural)'
Class II	/CVx-/	da’axłk 'able' → daxda’axłk 'able (plural)'
Class III	/CVC-/	dal 'fight' → dildal 'fights'
Class IV	/CV-/	siipk 'sick (verb)' → sipsiipk 'sick (plural)'
Class V	/-V/ or /-VC/ (can be infixed or suffixed after primary syllable)	yuutsk 'necklace' → yu’itsk 'necklaces'

==== Distributives ====
Besides reduplication, plurals can also be formed by adding lexical clitics. Prefixing or infixing g̲a acts as a distributive. It is best translated as "each one his/her own". The words that take this prefix usually have a specific relation to an individual, such as body parts, clothing and kin.

- g̱oot 'heart'→ g̱a̱g̱oot 'hearts'
- agwinabiip 'great uncle' → agwig̱a̱nabiip 'great uncles'

==== Iteratives ====
The word gyik 'again' may be prefixed to form some plurals, especially those referring to time.

- suunt "summer"→ gyiksuunt "summers"

==== Intensives ====
The word for 'very' luk'wil be shortened to lu- and pre- or infixed onto some words to form the plural. This process may result in extremely divergent forms, because of phonological processes.

- hadiks 'swim' → la̱heediks 'swim (plural)'

==== Isomorphics and Suppletives ====
Finally, some plural forms are the same as the singular (lak "fire" → lak "fires") and some words have suppletive plurals, where there is no morphological relationship between the two: (waa "name" → uust "names").

=== Suffixes ===
==== Derivational Suffixes ====
There are ten suffixes that may be attached to words to derive words with meanings related in some way to the original morpheme . These suffixes can change either the grammatical relationship and/or the grammatical function. The names for the types listed below are shortened descriptions of those provided by Dunn.

- Consequential: -x (sometimes -ḵ). The derived form is the consequence of or has been affected by the stem.
  ḵ'o'a̱l "forget" → ḵ'oolax "dull; warm one's back by the fire"
- Instrumental: -t. The derived form is a person or thing that uses the stem in some way.
  gyemk "sun, moon" → gyemga̱t "astronomer"
- Purposive: both -l and -n. These two suffixes indicate that the stem is the goal or intention of a person, thing or action.
  buu "blow, sound (of a whale)" → buul "warn"
- Singularly Qualitative: -k. The derived form shares a single quality with the root.
  gwisgwaas "bluejay" → gwisgwaask "blue"
- Plurally Qualitative: -s, -sk, -ts (sometimes -k). The derived form is in many respects similar to the root.
  yuutk "carry around the neck" → 'yutisk "necklace"
- Metaphorical: -tk. The derived form has a metaphorical relationship with the stem.
  łoo "drift, swim (fish)" → ło'otk "clouds"

==== Lexical Suffixes ====
There are five lexically derived morphemes that can be attached to words to alter the meaning. The affixed morphemes can be extremely altered from their original forms, sometimes according to phonological rules, sometimes arbitrarily. Usually the suffix root is shortened to one syllable before it is attached.

1. aks "water" → ts’ala̰ks "whirlpool" (ts’al "eye")
2. g̲an "tree; wood; stick" → batsgn "arrive in a boat" (batsk "arrive")
3. gyet "man" → gyitwaalgyit "raiders" (gyitwaal "attack")
4. ban "belly" → waaybn "pregnant (for dogs and disparagingly for women)" (waay "paddle")
5. diilmx "respond" This suffix is used to describe languages, so the language of the Haida would be haydmx

=== Proclitics ===
Below is a sample list of some of the many proclitics in Tsimshian. Attached to nouns and verbs, they may convey locative, aspectual, modal, case relational and lexical information. The following descriptions of the prefixes are intended to convey what sort of position the object or person is in. So lax- can be used to express the top of the foot, because it has the properties of being "above" and "parallel", and t'm- could be used for the backbone, because it has the properties of being "above" and "perpendicular". "Tangent" indicates that the object or action is taking place next to, or alongside of something. "Efferent" refers to going away from the action.

==== Locative ====
Stative

- lax- tangent, above, parallel
- t'm- tangent, above, perpendicular
- lag̲ax tangent, not above, bilateral
- łüü-, łüükłi-, łüükwłi- proximate, below
- na̰k- proximate, not below
- alo-, alu- remote, below

Motional

- ksi-, ksa-, ksü-, xsa- internal source, efferent
- g̲ałdik- internal source, efferent, ascending
- txa- internal source, efferent, descending
- bax- tangent source, tangent goal, ascending, parageographic
- dzag̲am- geographic, upstream
- uks- geographic, out to sea

aspectual

- si-, sü-, su- beginning, inception
- adigul- continual, enduring
- huk- habitual
- gwüldm beforehand
- wil- subsequent

Modal

- ap-, a̰b- certain
- kbi-, xbi- not really, half
- liks-, lüks- different, strange
- sis-, süs- play, pretend
- sm- real genuine (as in sm'algyax "true language")

Case

- ha- instrumental
- ha'ali- place or time for
- sa̰-, si-, sü-, s- causative
- xs- resemble

==== Lexical ====
Like the lexical suffixes, these proclitics derive from existing morphemes and can alter the stem meaning in various ways. Proclitics are much more common than suffixes; only a small list is provided.

- aam "good" → amadaalḵ "praise, worship" (daalg̲ "rebuke; scold")
- gwa̰s "blanket" → gwisg̲an "cedar bark mat coat; raincoat" (g̲an "tree")
- gyełk "to stab" → gyiłts'ax "nose-ring" (ts'a̰ḵ "nose")
- ts'usk "little" → ts'übaa "lame (run a short distance)" (baa "run")
- 'wiileeks "big" → 'wiiḵ'ooli "one with long hair" (ḵ'ooli "scalp")

== Syntax ==
Tsimshian is an ergative–absolutive language. Although nominal and verbal marking allows syntax to be freer than English, word order is still an important aspect of the phrase. The basic word order for transitive and intransitive sentences is:

Intransitive	Transitive
yagwa baas Meli; TEMP run Mary; TEMP VERB ABS "Mary is running."	ładm ḵ'ag̲a 'yuuta liksoog̲ada haḵ'ag̲a TEMP open man door key.INS; TEMP VERB ERG ABS IO.INS/BEN/LOC "A man is about to open a door with a key."

Inversions to this order are permitted. To place specific emphasis on the ergative noun (topicalization), it may be moved to the front of the phrase with the subsequent changes: temporal marker + -t and in- + verb. However, this order is only permitted if the topicalized ergative is a pronoun (independent, demonstrative, interrogative or relative). Proper nouns are never placed first in the sentence, except in a vocative sense. Any absolutive noun may be topicalized as well with the following changes: temporal marker + t and verb + da. (Dunn has shown that the affixed particles on the temporal marker and the verb are falling out of use among the younger generation. It now is quite "formal" to use either in speech.

=== Verb phrase ===
The basic verb phrase in Tsimshian is ordered: TEMPORAL MARKER, verb. However, many of the noun phrases in the sentence can be represented on both the verb and/or the temporal marker as affixes. There are five temporal markers which can combine to form various tenses or aspects.

- nah: (perfective) nah dzap "already made"
- dm: (future/progressive) dm dzap "will make", "is going to make", "is making"
- ła: (near to present) ła dzap "just beginning to make"
- wil: (sequentially following) wil dzap "and then made"
- yagwa: (present-only with action verbs) yagwa dzap "be making right now," "is now making"

Some combined temporal expressions:

- ła-dm dzap: "just about to start making"
- nah ła-wil dzap "and then just finished making"
- dm ła-wil dzap "and now just about to start making"

=== Noun phrase ===
The basic noun phrase is ordered as: NUMERICAL MARKER, adjective, noun, determinater, possessive. A numerical marker and a determiner cannot appear in the same phrase together.

==== Numbers ====
Similar to classifiers in other languages, there are seven different counting systems depending on what is being counted. Abstract entities, flat objects and animals, round objects and units of time, human beings, long objects, canoes and lastly, measurements, all must be counted differently. The numeral gets an -a connective if it ends in a stop, affricate or fricative.

- gu'pl uwalp "two houses"
- t'apxaada guksłüüsk "two shirts"
- t'apxaaduul hana'nax "two women"
- guladaada hana'nax "two women aboard (some conveyance)"
- g̲abeeltk g̲axsoo "two canoes"

==== Adjectives ====
Like numerals, adjectives appear before the noun they modify. They take an -m connective as well as match the noun in number (singular or plural). If both a numeral and an adjective appear together, the numeral always precedes the adjective.

- siipgm haasa "a sick dog"
- txalpxdool al'alg̲m smgyigyet "four angry chiefs"

==== Determiners ====
Determiners follow the noun they modify and the noun gets a connective -a suffix. There are six determinative words:

- gwa'a "here, close to speaker"
- gwasga "over there, that way"
- doni "over there"
- awaan "over there" (close to hearer)
- gwi definite ("the")
- ta'a for deceased kin only

==== Possessives ====
Possession is shown by placing the possessing noun after the object being possessed, which gets an -a connective. If the object being possessed is not considered to be closely connected to the owner in some way (body parts, clothing, kin) then the object also gets a na- prefix.

- gyigyeda huwaap "The color of the houses"
- nahoon 'yuuta "the man's fish"

==== Ergatives ====
If the verb is transitive then the agent of the verb is treated as an ergative and the object as an absolutive. In these cases, the temporal marker receives the suffix -t, the verb receives -da and the ergative noun itself has an -a suffix. (Proper nouns require variant suffixes.)

Yagwat niisda ts'uu'tsa laalt
yagwa-t niits-da ts'uu'ts-a laalt
TEMP see bird worm
"The bird sees the worm."

Transitive sentences in which the verb is closely related to the absolutive can actually allow the noun to be attached onto the verb, a process called incorporation. A verbal connector -m- is then used to suffix the noun onto the verb.

ławil aadmhoonu
ławil aat-m-hoon-u
TEMP seine(verb)-CONN-fish(noun)-I
"And then I was just now seining for fish (fish-seining)."

==== Absolutives ====
When an intransitive verb is used, the agent of the verb is treated as an absolutive. If the absolutive directly follows the verb then the verb receives an -a suffix. (Proper nouns again require different suffixes.)

Nah siipga hana'a
nah siipk-a hana'a
TEMP sick woman
"the woman was sick"

=== Pronominals ===
Much of the information appearing in a noun phrase can be expressed on the verb phrase as a pronominal. Ergative and absolutive phrases affix onto the verb phrase and take a different form depending on person and number. Below are the most common forms of absolutive suffixes, although depending on the tense, different suffixes are applicable.

	Singular	Plural
1st Person	-u	-m
2nd Person	-n	-sm
3rd Person	-t	-t

ładm baayu
TEMP run.I
"I'm about to run"

ła ḵ'olt
TEMP run(PL).they
"They're just now running."

If there is an (unmarked) ergative noun in the sentence along with the absolutive pronoun, the temporal marker also gets a suffixed -t.

ławilt niidzu ol
TEMP see.me bear
"And just now the bear has seen me."

Dunn has found that some temporal markers take a suffix and others do not. It seems to be "a matter of local and personal style".

Ergative pronominals appear before the verb on the temporal marker as infixes or suffixes. Some tense markers call for different affixes. With the perfective tense nah, for instance, the ergative suffixes are identical to the absolutive suffixes. Below is the most common form of ergative affix.

	Singular	Plural
1st person	-n-	-dip-
2nd person	-m-	-m-sm-
3rd person	-t-	-t-

ładipwil lu'niidza ol awaan
{TEMP we TEMP} see(PL) bear there.by.you
"And just now we have seen those bears by you."

Both pronominals can occur in one sentence:

łan dzagwat
{TEMP I} {kill(SG) it/him/her/them}
"I am about to kill it/him/her/them."

== See also ==
- For the Tsimshian peoples see Tsimshian, Gitxsan, and Nisga'a
