= Gitwangak Indian Band =

Gitwangak
- Band No. 536
- People: Gitxsan
- Headquarters: Kitwanga
- Province: British Columbia

Land
- Main reserve: Gitwangak 1
- Reserves: List: Gitwangak 2; Squin-lix-stat 3; Kwa-sta-lix 4; Tum-bah 5; Kits-ka-haws 6; Koonwats 7; Chig-in-kaht 8
- Land area: 15.72 km^{2} (6.07 sq mi)

Population (2025)
- On reserve: 419
- On other land: 53
- Off reserve: 1075
- Total population: 1547

The Gitwangak Indian Band (formerly Kitwanga) is a band government in the Skeena Country region of northwestern British Columbia, Canada. They Gitwangak people are part of the larger Gitxsan group. Their name means "People of the Land of Rabbits". They are members of the Gitxsan Treaty Society.

== Chief and Councillors ==
=== 2015–2017 ===
| Title | Name | Appointment date | Ending date |
|---|---|---|---|
| Chief | Frederick Johnson | 05/09/2015 | 05/08/2017 |
| Councillor | Amanda Zettergreen | 05/09/2015 | 05/08/2017 |
| Councillor | Chasity Daniels | 05/09/2015 | 05/08/2017 |
| Councillor | Holly Harris | 05/09/2015 | 05/08/2017 |
| Councillor | Fred Johnson | 05/09/2015 | 05/08/2017 |
| Councillor | Tom Johnson | 05/09/2015 | 05/08/2017 |

== Demographics ==
| Residency | # |
|---|---|
| Registered Males On Own Reserve | 230 |
| Registered Females On Own Reserve | 180 |
| Registered Males On Other Reserves | 21 |
| Registered Females On Other Reserves | 17 |
| Registered Males Off Reserve | 402 |
| Registered Females Off Reserve | 453 |
| Total Registered Population | 1303 |
