= Fin Island =

Island in British Columbia, Canada

Fin Island is an island in the North Coast region of British Columbia, Canada, to the northwest of Gil Island between Cridge and Lewis Passages.

Lachkul-jeets Indian Reserve No. 6 is on the island's east side at 53°16′00″N 129°19′00″W, and is 1.60 ha. (4.0 acres). It is one of the many reserves of the Hartley Bay Indian Band of the Gitga'ata group of Tsimshian.

== See also ==
- List of islands of British Columbia
- List of Indian reserves in British Columbia
