= K'mooda/Lowe-Gamble Conservancy =

Conservancy in British Columbia, Canada

K’mooda/Lowe-Gamble Conservancy
- IUCN category II (national park)
- Location within British Columbia Location within Canada
- Location: North Coast, British Columbia, Canada
- Nearest city: Hartley Bay
- Coordinates: 53°33′55″N 129°26′22″W
- Area: 14,454 hectares (144.54 km^{2})
- Elevation: 251 meters (823 ft)
- Established: July 13, 2006; 19 years ago
- Governing body: BC Parks

K'mooda/Lowe-Gamble Conservancy is a conservancy in North Coast, British Columbia, Canada. It covers an area of 14,454 hectares (144.54 km^{2}), and was founded on July 13, 2006.

== Geography ==
The conservancy is located about 20 kilometers northwest of Hartley Bay, at an altitude of 251 meters above the sea level. It consists of territory around three lakes: Lowe, Weare and Gamble.
