= Angela Sterritt =

Canadian journalist

Angela Sterritt is a Canadian journalist of the Gitxsan Nation, who was a multi-platform reporter for the Canadian Broadcasting Corporation in Vancouver, British Columbia for more than 10 years. She is most noted as a Canadian Screen Award winner for Best Local Reporter at the 9th Canadian Screen Awards in 2021, for her story on a Heiltsuk grandfather and granddaughter who were wrongfully accused of bank fraud when trying to open the young girl's first bank account.

She was previously nominated in the same category at the 8th Canadian Screen Awards in 2020, for her reportage on efforts to reunite indigenous families whose children have been taken into British Columbia's child welfare system.

A Gitxsan member of the Gitanmaax First Nation, she began her career with the CBC in the early 2000s as a researcher at CBYG-FM in Prince George. She later studied political science at the University of British Columbia, and was a multi-platform reporter in Yellowknife, Toronto, Winnipeg, and Vancouver, for more than 10 years reporting for CBC television, radio and online.

In 2023 Sterritt published Unbroken: My Fight for Survival, Hope, and Justice for Indigenous Women and Girls, a book that blends investigative reportage into the stories of Missing and Murdered Indigenous Women with aspects of personal memoir about her own experiences as an indigenous woman who spent some time in her teen years living on the streets, and thus could have been vulnerable to going missing or being murdered herself. The book was a shortlisted finalist for the Hilary Weston Writers' Trust Prize for Nonfiction, the Jim Deva Prize for Writing that Provokes, and the Governor General's Award for English-language non-fiction at the 2023 Governor General's Awards.
