= Kitwanga Mountain Provincial Park =

Provincial park in British Columbia, Canada

- IUCN category II (national park)
- Location within British Columbia
- Interactive map of Kitwanga Mountain Provincial Park
- Location: British Columbia, Canada
- Nearest city: Hazelton
- Coordinates: 55°06′51″N 128°09′20″W
- Area: 7.2 km^{2} (2.8 sq mi)
- Established: July 23, 1997
- Governing body: BC Parks
- Website: bcparks.ca/kitwanga-mountain-park/

Kitwanga Mountain Provincial Park is a provincial park in British Columbia, Canada located on the north side of the Skeena River just west of the Gitxsan community of Kitwanga (Gitwangak).

The park was established on July 23, 1997 and is approximately 720 ha. in size.

== See also ==
- Kitwanga Fort National Historic Site
