= Glen Vowell =

Coordinates: 55°18′44″N 127°40′24″W

Glen Vowell is an Indian reserve community of the Gitxsan people in the Hazelton area of the Skeena Country of northwestern British Columbia, Canada. It is located on the west side of the Skeena River between Hazelton and Kispiox. Its traditional name is Sik i dak, which has also been spelled Sikadoak and is reflected in the name of the reserve, Sik-e-dakh IR 2. Also nearby is another Indian reserve, Anlaw Indian Reserve No. 4. The band government of the reserve is the Glen Vowell Indian Band, which also goes by the name Sik-e-Dakh.

The site was first identified on official maps in BC Mines Department records from 1910 as ""Glenvowell Salvation Army Mission". By 1922 this was adjusted to "Glen Vowell (Mission)" and as "Glen Vowell (Indian Village & Mission)" in the 1930 BC Gazetteer.

The name is derived from that of Arthur Stewart Vowell, who surveyed the townsite in 1898 during the eponymous Vowell Commission, one of a series of Royal Commissions concerned with allocating Indian Reserves across British Columbia.

== See also ==
- 'Ksan
- Kitwanga Fort National Historic Site
- Gitxsan Nation
