= Whitmore Islands =

Island group in British Columbia, Canada

Coordinates: 52°38′38″N 129°26′31″W

The Whitmore Islands are a small group of islands in Hecate Strait, west of Aristazabal Island in the North Coast region of British Columbia, Canada. With the nearby Moore Islands and McKenney Islands the three groups together comprise the Moore/McKenny/Whitmore Ecological Preserve.

== Name origin ==
The islands were named in 1927 for Corporal Henry Whitmore who served in British Columbia with the Columbia Detachment of the Royal Engineers from 1858 to 1863.

== See also ==
- List of islands of British Columbia
