= KSAN =

KSAN may refer to:

- The ICAO airport code for San Diego International Airport
- KSAN (AM), a defunct radio station in San Francisco, California, United States
- KSAN (FM), a radio station (107.7 FM) licensed to San Mateo, California, United States
- KSAN-TV, a television station (channel 3) licensed to San Angelo, Texas, United States
- KSAN-TV (San Francisco), former name of KMTP-TV, in San Francisco, California, United States
- KYLD, a radio station (94.9 FM) licensed to San Francisco, California, United States, which used the call sign KSAN-FM from May 1968 to July 1997
- 'Ksan, a First Nations Museum and Historical Village near Hazelton, British Columbia

== See also ==
Kasaan, a village of the Kaigani Haida on Prince of Wales Island, Alaska
