= Marie-Lucie Tarpent =

Canadian linguist (born 1941)

- Born: November 9, 1941 (age 84)

Academic background
- Education: University of Paris BA; Cornell University MA; University of Victoria PhD
- Thesis: A Grammar of the Nisgha Language (1987)

Academic work
- Discipline: Linguist
- Institutions: Coast Mountain College (formerly Northwest Community College); Mount Saint Vincent University
- Main interests: Nisga'a language
- Notable works: "Documenting Alaskan and Neighboring Languages."

Marie-Lucie Tarpent (born November 9, 1941) is a French-born Canadian linguist, formerly an associate professor of linguistics and French at Mount Saint Vincent University, Halifax, Nova Scotia, Canada. She is known for her descriptive work on the Nisga'a language, a member of the Tsimshianic language family, and for her proof of the affiliation of the Tsimshianic languages to the Penutian language group.

== Early life and education ==
Marie-Lucie Tarpent was born on November 9, 1941, in Tonnerre, France. Tarpent graduated with a licence ès lettres (bachelor's) degree in English and German from the University of Paris in 1963. The following year, she attended the University of Vermont before earning a master's degree in linguistics in 1965 from Cornell University. From 1967–1970 and 1974–1977, Tarpent attended Simon Fraser University. She was on a Social Sciences and Humanities Research Council doctoral fellowship in from 1981–1983. In 1983, Tarpent was a part-time instructor at Northwest Community College (now called "Coast Mountain College"). She completed her Doctorate in Linguistics at the University of Victoria in 1989.

== Career ==
In addition to her work on the Nisga'a language, in the 1990s she contributed to the expansion of Harlan I. Smith's early work: Ethnobotany of the Gitksan Indians of British Columbia with details of the Gitksan language. The expanded version was published in 1997. While at the University of Victoria, she published an analysis of the counting systems of the Nishga and Gitskan languages.

In 1998, Tarpent, with linguist Daythal Kendall, presented a paper on the lack of evidence for a close relationship between the Oregon Penutian languages Takelma and Kalapuyan, and therefore for the previously hypothesized "Takelman". In 1999, Tarpent authored a chapter titled ""On the eve of a new paradigm: The current challenges to comparative linguistics in a Kuhnian perspective." She has contributed significantly to the knowledge on Nisga'a and Southern Tsimshianic languages at Kitasoo/Xaixais First Nation, particularly in regard to the importance of morphemes.

Starting in September 2007, Tarpent was one of ten senior scholars in the field of linguistics to participate in the International Polar Year project "Documenting Alaskan and Neighboring Languages."

== Works ==
- Tarpent, Marie-Lucie (1982). Ergative and accusative: a single representation of grammatical relations with evidence from Nisgha. University of Victoria: Working Papers of the Linguistic Circle 2:1.
- Tarpent, Marie-Lucie (1983). Morphophonemics of Nisgha plural formation: a step towards Proto-Tsimshian reconstruction. Kansas Working Papers in Linguistics 8.2. pp. 123–214.
- Tarpent, M. L. (1987). A Grammar of the Nisgha Language. University of Victoria. ISBN 978-0-315-68126-2.
- Tarpent, M. L. (January 1997). "Tsimshianic and Penutian: Problems, Methods, Results, and Implications". International Journal of American Linguistics. 63 (1): 65–112. doi:10.1086/466314. S2CID 145019037.
- L. J. Brinton, ed. (2001). "On the eve of a new paradigm". Historical Linguistics 1999: Selected Papers from the 14th International Conference on Historical Linguistics, Vancouver, 9-13 August 1999. Amsterdam studies in the theory and history of linguistic science: 4. J. Benjamins. ISBN 978-1-58811-064-0.
