= Vowell =

Vowell is a surname. Notable people with the surname include:

- Arthur Wellesley Vowell (1841–1918), Irish-born civil servant and political figure in British Columbia
- Jack Vowell (1927–2006), American politician, businessman, and academic
- Peter Vowell (died 1654), schoolteacher executed as a Catholic and Royalist conspirator
- Robert Vowell, MP
- Sarah Vowell (born 1969), American author, journalist, essayist and social commentator

== See also ==
- Glen Vowell, British Columbia, First Nation reserve community of the Gitxsan people in the Hazelton area of the Skeena Country of British Columbia, Canada
- Vowel, category of letter
