= Kitwanga River =

- Mouth of Kitwanga River

Location
- Country: Canada
- Province: British Columbia
- District: Cassiar Land District

Physical characteristics
- Source: Nass Ranges
  - location: Hazelton Mountains
  - coordinates: 55°19′26″N 128°21′35″W
  - elevation: 1,536 m (5,039 ft)
- Mouth: Skeena River
  - location: Kitwanga
  - coordinates: 55°6′2″N 128°5′7″W
  - elevation: 184 m (604 ft)
- Length: 70 km (43 mi)

The Kitwanga River is a tributary of the Skeena River near Hazelton in northwestern British Columbia, Canada, joining that stream at the community of Kitwanga (Gitwangak), which means "people of the place of rabbits".

The river is approximately 70 kilometres (43 mi) long, beginning in the mountains to the northwest and curving around via and including 7-kilometre (4 mi) long Kitwancool Lake before heading south for 30 kilometres (19 mi) to the confluence with the Skeena. Just north of Kitwancool Lake is a level pass with the upper basin of the Cranberry River, a tributary of the Nass. The Kispiox Range lies west of the valley of the Kitwanga and Cranberry rivers.

== See also ==
- List of rivers of British Columbia
- Kitwanga Fort National Historic Site
- Kitwanga Mountain Provincial Park
