= Walter Harris (artist) =

Walter Harris OC (June 10, 1931 – January 12, 2009), also known as Simogyet Geel, was a Canadian artist and hereditary chief from the Gitxsan (Gitksan) First Nation in northwestern British Columbia.

== Biography ==
Harris was born to parents Chris and Clara Harris in Kispiox. In 1957, Harris became the hereditary Chief of the Fireweed Clan, assuming the name Chief Geel from his uncle. His crest is the killer whale.

In the 1960s, during his partnership in a small lumber mill and working as a carpenter, Harris worked on the reconstructed village of 'Ksan, at Hazelton. This led him to enrol at the Gitanmaax School of Northwest Coast Indian Art in 1969, studying jewellery under Jack Leyland, wood carving under Duane Pasco and Doug Cranmer, and attended seminars on Northwest Coast graphic design given by Bill Holm. He was eventually named senior carving instructor for the period 1972- 1985.

Harris and his wife, Sadie, had five children and twenty grandchildren. His two sons, Rodney and Richard, also pursued the carving tradition, working with him on several projects, as did his sister Doreen Jensen.

The Canadian federal government appointed Harris to the Fine Arts Committee in 1978. The Committee selects and assists in the purchase of indigenous art from across Canada.

In 1987, Harris had a massive stroke, followed by major heart surgery in 1990. Harris died on January 12, 2009.

== Major works ==
In the early 1970s Harris, assisted by other 'Ksan carvers, raised the first traditional totem pole in modern times.

Other major commissions include a wood panel for the Canadian embassy in Paris and a limestone killer whale for the entry of to the House of Commons in Ottawa. His work is also in the Vancouver International Airport, San Francisco's Golden Gate Park, Victoria Island in the Ottawa River, a Westar Sawmill office in Japan. Other pieces include four large screens for the Royal Bank of Canada in Vancouver, a set of massive red cedar doors for UBC's Museum of Anthropology, totem poles in Rochester, New York, and Baltimore, Maryland, and a large killer whale carving for the Vancouver Art Gallery.

=== Awards ===
- 2005 Officer of the Order of Canada
- 2003 Governor General's Awards in Visual and Media Arts

=== Further reading ===
Macnair, Peter L., Alan L. Hoover, and Kevin Neary (1984) The Legacy: Tradition and Innovation in Northwest Coast Indian Art. Vancouver, B.C.: Douglas & McIntyre.

Stewart, Hilary (1993). Looking at Totem Poles. Seattle: University of Washington Press. ISBN 0-295-97259-9.

Stewart, Hilary. Totem Poles. Douglas & McIntyre.
