= Gitxsan Treaty Society =

The Gitxsan Treaty Society handles Treaty negotiations in the BC Treaty Process for a number of First Nations in northwestern British Columbia

== Treaty Process ==
The Gitxsan Treaty Society has reached Stage 4 in the BC Treaty Process.

== Membership ==
- Gitanmaax Band Council
- Gitsegukla Indian Band (formerly Kitsegugkla)
- Gitwangak Band Council (also Kitwanga)
- Glen Vowell Indian Band
- Kispiox Band Council

== See also ==
- List of tribal councils in British Columbia
