= Kitkiata Inlet =

Inlet in British Columbia, Canada

Kitkiata Inlet is an inlet on the North Coast of British Columbia, Canada, off the west side of Douglas Channel. Kitkiata Creek flows into the inlet from the north at 53°38′18″N 129°16′20″W. Up it at 53°42′51″N 129°17′27″W is Kitkiata Lake.

Located on Kitkiata Inlet near the mouth of the Quaal River, which flows southeast into the head of the inlet at 53°38′53″N 129°18′12″W, at 53°38′00″N 129°17′00″W. is Quaal Indian Reserve No. 3A. Also on the inlet is Kitkahta Indian Reserve No. 1 at 53°38′00″N 129°16′00″W.

Reserves in this area, including those named on the Quaal River article, are under the governance of the Hartley Bay Indian Band of the Gitga'at.
