= Gitgaʼat First Nation =

First Nation government in British Columbia, Canada

- Band No. 675
- People: Gitga'ata people
- Province: British Columbia

Land
- Main reserve: Kulkayu (Hartley Bay) 4
- Land area: 6.42 km^{2} (2.48 sq mi)

Population (2024)
- On reserve: 143
- On other land: 26
- Off reserve: 703
- Total population: 872

Government
- Chief: G. Bruce Reece

Tribal Council
- Tsimshian Tribal Council

Website
- www.gitgaatnation.ca

The Gitgaʼat First Nation is a Canadian First Nation, also known as the Hartley Bay First Nation. The members of the Gitga'at First Nation are often referred to as the Gitka'a'ata. The population of Gitka'a'ata peoples living in Hartley Bay is around 140 as of November 2024. There are also about 400–500 Gitk’a’ata peoples living in Prince Rupert, British Columbia. The Gitk’a’ata people have lived in Hartley Bay for hundreds of years, possibly longer. During the COVID-19 pandemic, there were requirements for visiting Hartley Bay, such as vaccination status and British Columbian passport.

== Economy ==
The Gitga'at Nation currently has a tourism-centric economy. Some of the past economies for Hartley Bay were centered around fishing (selling fish, fishing lodges). These methods still generate income in the present. Tourism surrounding fishing lodges emerged in 2009 and became the most prominent source of income. It is still the most prominent. There are also camps that are for recreational and educational activities such as radio and industrial construction. These camps are usually executed as "boot camps" and are advertised to give job opportunities. There are also constant job postings on the Gitga'at First Nation social media pages.

== Geography ==
The area of Hartley Bay is large and for the most part undeveloped and forest. It is bordered by Prince Rupert, Kitimat, and several islands off the west coast of British Columbia.

== Government ==
The current counsel is made up by Arnold Clifton (Chief Councilor), Cam Hill, Marven Robinson, Bruce Reece, and Simone Reece (councilors). There are representatives known as "Guardians" that work towards preserving and protecting their territory from others that may use harmful ways of getting resources on their territory. In addition to Guardians, the community values its environment and land, so typically the Guardians are focused on any potential threats to the territory. The Guardians do many tasks including protecting the ocean from fisheries riding the line of the territory and conducting research to protect coastal habitats and endangered species.

== Sports ==
The Gitga'at First Nation has participated in the All Native Basketball Tournament.

== Relations ==
Hartley Bay Indian Band entered a treaty with Canada and British Columbia known as The Gitga'at Treaty. The treaty is still in progress but is gearing towards ownership of certain areas of land and the right to use it as they please (hunt, fish, develop, reserve, etc.) In 2003, The Hartley Bay Indian Band made a deal with British Columbia to settle a land dispute in for the right to tree cutting licenses and a cash payment.

The Gitga'at First Nation first encountered Europeans in the early 1800s. Katherine Turner has made several dissertations that include the Hartley Bay Band.

== Indian reserves ==
Indian reserves under the administration of the Hartley Bay First Nation are:

- Gander Island Indian Reserve No. 14, on one of the islands of the Moore Group, off the west coast of Aristazabal Island in Hecate Strait, 121.40 ha. (300.0 acres) 52°40′00″N 129°25′00″W
- Gill Island Indian Reserve No. 2, on the left bank of the Quaal River, at its mouth on Kitkiata Inlet in Douglas Channel, 0.10 ha. (0.25 acres) 53°39′00″N 129°17′00″W
- Gribble Island Indian Reserve No. 10, on the west coast of Gribbell Island, between Verney and Ursula Channels, 2.0 h.a (5.0 acres) 53°21′00″N 129°08′00″W
- Kahas Indian Reserve No. 7, on west coast of Princess Royal Island at Barnard Harbour, 16.50 ha (40.8 acres) 53°04′00″N 129°07′00″W
- Kayel Indian Reserve No. 8, on west shore of Princess Royal Island fronting on Campania Sound, 1.60 ha. (4.0 acres) 53°04′00″N 129°10′00″W
- Kitkahta Indian Reserve No. 1, on the north short of Kitkiata Inlet of Douglas Channel, 112.50 ha. (278.0 acres) 53°38′00″N 129°16′00″W
- Kulkayu (Hartley Bay) Indian Reserve No. 4, on south shore of Hartley Bay of Douglas Channel, 130.70 ha. (323.0 acres) 53°25′25″N 129°15′35″W
- Kulkayu (Hartley Bay) Indian Reserve No. 4A, adjacent to Kulkayu (Hartley Bay) IR No. 4, 45.30 ha. (112.0 acres) 53°25′00″N 129°15′00″W
- Kunhunoan Indian Reserve No. 13, on Small Bay, west coast of Gil Island, near Black Rock Point on Squally Channel, 2.30 ha. (5.7 acres) 53°13′00″N 129°18′00″W
- Lachkul-jeets Indian Reserve No. 6, on the east side of Fin Island west of Gil Island, Hecate Sound, 1.60 ha. (4.0 acres) 53°16′00″N 129°19′00″W
- Lackzuswadda Indian Reserve No. 9, on an island at the entrance to Surf Inlet, west coast of Princess Royal Island, 2.20 ha. (5.4 acres) 52°54′00″N 129°09′00″W
- Maple Point Indian Reserve No. 11, at Maple Point, east shore of Gil Island between Squally and Whale Channels off Hecate Sound, 50.20 ha. (124.0 acres) 53°06′00″N 129°12′00″W
- Quaal Indian Reserve No. 3, on right bank of the Quaal River, one mile (1.6 km) west of the mouth of Kitkiata Inlet of Douglas Channel, 29 ha. (72 acres). 53°39′00″N 129°20′00″W
- Quaal Indian Reserve No. 3A, an addition to Quaal IR No. 3, 74.50 ha. (184.0 acres) 53°38′00″N 129°17′00″W
- Turtle Point Indian Reserve No. 12, at Turtle Point, north end of Gil Island, fronting on Wright Sound, 51.80 ha. (128.0 acres) 53°19′00″N 129°16′00″W
