= Judith P. Morgan =

Judith Phyllis Morgan (April 27, 1930 - June 30, 2016) was a First Nations Gitxsan artist from Kitwanga, British Columbia, Canada.

Morgan was born in the town of Gitwangak, also known as Kitwanga, in British Columbia. Her father was a Tsimshian chief, and her mother was also descended from tribal leaders. In the 1940's, she attended the Alberni Indian Residential School. There, she met George Sinclair, who encouraged her in the development of her art; as a result, she won a two-year scholarship to Cottey College, in Nevada, Missouri. She also attended the Kansas City Art Institute in 1953 and 1954. In 1953, she married Willis O. Fitzpatrick, with whom she had five children. She is the first known Indigenous artist from Canada to receive an arts degree, which she obtained from the University of Kansas, where she complete a bachelor's degree in art education in 1976.

Morgan first showed her work in the mid-1940s after a residence at the BC Provincial Museum. The resulting exhibition toured across Canada, including to the Vancouver Art Gallery and the Victoria Memorial Museum. Throughout her life, she exhibited across Canada and the United States. Among her awards are a first prize from the Pacific National Exhibition in Vancouver (1947) and another first prize from the Arts and Crafts Society Exhibition in Victoria (1948). Five of Morgan's paintings were purchased by the provincial government in 1949, and they remain in the British Columbia Archives. Morgan returned to Gitwangak in 1983 where she opened a gallery, the Gitksan Paintbrush.
