= Southern Tsimshian dialect =

Tsimshian variety of British Columbia, Canada

Southern Tsimshian
- Sgüüx̣s, Sgüümk
- Pronunciation: [skiːxs]
- Native to: Canada
- Region: northwest British Columbia
- Ethnicity: Tsimshian people
- Extinct: 2013, with the death of Violet Neasloss
- Revival: 4 learners (2018)
- Language family: Tsimshianic: Maritime Tsimshian; Southern Tsimshian

Language codes
- ISO 639-3: –
- Glottolog: sout2962
- ELP: Ski:xs (Southern Tsimshian)
- Southern Tsimshian

- People: Ts’msyan
- Language: Sgüüx̣s
- Country: La̱xyuubm Ts’msyen

Southern Tsimshian, Sgüüx̣s (Note: Also spelled Sgüüxs, SgüüXs, Sgüüxs, or Ski:xs.) (pronounced: /skiːxs/) or Sgüümk, is the southern dialect of the Tsimshian language, spoken by the Gitga'ata and Kitasoo Tsimshians in Klemtu, B.C. It became extinct with the death of the last remaining speaker, Violet Neasloss.

Sgüüx̣s is close to Coast Tsimshian and has been described as a highly conservative dialect, however it may not have been mutually intelligible with Coast Tsimshian. The name Sgüüx̣s means "the language beside."

Specialist John Asher Dunn wrote several articles on the language, from which the term Southern Tsimshian arose.
