= Gitgaʼat people =

Hartley Bay, B.C. in 2003

The Gitgaʼat (sometimes also spelled Gitgaʼata or Gitkʼaʼata) are one of the 14 tribes of the Tsimshian nation in British Columbia, Canada, and inhabit the village of Hartley Bay, British Columbia, the name of which in the Tsimshian language is Txałgiu. The name Gitgaʼata in the Tsimshian language means 'people of the cane' (as in, a ceremonial stick). The Gitgaʼata, along with the Kitasoo Tsimshians at Klemtu, British Columbia, are often classed as "Southern Tsimshian", their traditional language being the southern dialect of the Tsimshian language. Most Tsimshian-speakers in Hartley Bay today, however, speak the form of the language shared by villages to the north. Their band government is the Hartley Bay Indian Band, aka the Gitgaʼat First Nation.

In 1947, Edmund Patalas ("belonging to the Kitamat tribe at Hartley Bay") described to the Tsimshian ethnologist William Beynon the origins of the Laxsgiik (Eagle clan) people of the "Gitxon" group who migrated from the land of the Haida people on Haida Gwaii first to Kitamaat and then to the Gitga'ata people, where a branch of this group, the House of Sinaxeet, is now considered "the royal Eagle house of Kitkata" (described in Barbeau's Totem Poles).

== Bibliography ==
- Barbeau, Marius (1950) Totem Poles. 2 vols. (Anthropology Series 30, National Museum of Canada Bulletin 119.) Ottawa: National Museum of Canada.
- Miller, Jay (1997) Tsimshian Culture: A Light through the Ages. Lincoln: University of Nebraska Press.
- Seguin, Margaret (ed.) (1984) The Tsimshian: Images of the Past; Views for the Present. Vancouver: UBC Press.
- Seguin, Margaret (1985) Interpretive Contexts for Traditional and Current Coast Tsimshian Feasts. Ottawa: National Museums of Canada.
- Turner, Nancy J., and Helen Clifton (2006) "The Forest and the Seaweed: Gitga'at Seaweed, Traditional Ecological Knowledge, and Community Survival." In: Traditional Ecological Knowledge and Natural Resource Management, ed. by Charles R. Menzies, pp. 66-86. Lincoln: University of Nebraska Press.
