= Wuikinuxv-Kitasoo-Nuxalk Tribal Council =

Native American organization

The Wuikinuxv-Kitasoo Xai'xais-Nuxalk Tribal Council, formerly the Oweekeno-Kitasoo-Nuxalk Tribal Council, is a First Nations tribal council comprising band governments of three indigenous peoples of the Central Coast region of British Columbia, Canada. The tribal council, composed of three band governments, spans four different cultures and languages:

- the Wuikinuxv or Oweekeno, based at Rivers Inlet
- the Nuxalk, based at Bella Coola
- the joint Tsimshian-Heiltsuk community people known as the Kitasoo/Xaixais Nation whose village is located at Klemtu.
