= Gitxsan language =

Tsimshianic language of Canada

Gitxsan
- Gitxsanimaax, Gitxsanimx
- Native to: Canada
- Region: Skeena region, British Columbia
- Ethnicity: 5,680 Gitxsan
- Native speakers: 775 (2021 census)
- Language family: Tsimshianic: Nass–Gitksan; Gitxsan

Language codes
- ISO 639-3: git
- Glottolog: gitx1241
- ELP: Gitsenimx̱
- Gitxsan

- Gitksan is classified as Severely Endangered by the UNESCO Atlas of the World's Languages in Danger.

- People: Gitx̱san
- Language: Gitxsanimaax
- Country: Gitx̱san Lax̱yip

Gitxsan /ˈɡɪtsæn/, or Gitxsanimaax (also rendered Gitksan, Giatikshan, Gityskyan, Giklsan and Sim Algyax), is an endangered Tsimshianic language of northwestern British Columbia, closely related to the neighboring Nisga’a language. The two groups are, however, politically separate and prefer to refer to Gitxsan and Nisga'a as distinct languages. According to the Report on the status of B.C First Nations Languages there are 255 fluent speakers, 339 that understand or somewhat speak and 648 learning speakers.

Gitxsan means "People of the river of mist", referring to the Skeena River.

== Dialects ==
Gitxsan language is primarily separated into Geenix or Eastern and Gyeets or Western Gitxsan, although each village has its own dialect. The Geenix or Eastern villages include Kispiox (Ansbayaxw), Glen Vowell (Sigit'ox), and Hazelton (Git-an'maaxs). The Gyeets or Western villages include Kitwanga (Gjtwjngax), Gitanyow (Git-antaaw) and Kitseguecla (Gijigyukwhla). The main differences between dialects include a lexical shift in vowels and stop lenition use present only in the Eastern dialects. The largest differences in language and culture exist between Eastern and Western Gitxsan, rather than between each village.

== History and usage ==
The University of Northern British Columbia and Siiwiixo'osxwim Wilnataahl Gitksan Society (Gitksan Language Society) set up a Developmental Standard Term Certificate program offered through Northwest Community College, with all courses offered in Hazelton, British Columbia. The program is designed to help revitalize Gitxsan language by allowing those who complete it to teach language and culture courses at the elementary and secondary school level in the community.

In the spring of 2018, an online dictionary app was released in collaboration with members of Gitksan Nation and researchers at the University of British Columbia. The app includes various dialects of Gitxsan, and includes audio from different villages. Flashcards, stories, and histories are also included in addition to functioning as a dictionary. This app is based on a print dictionary produced in 1973 by Lonnie Hindle and Bruce Rigsby. With its launch, the app briefly held a top spot in Google Play's education category and accumulated around 500 downloads in its first week.

== Phonology ==
The Gitxsan inventory is as follows:

Gitxsan vowels
| | Front | Central | Back |
|---|---|---|---|
| High | i iː | | u uː |
| Mid | eː | ə | oː |
| Low | | a aː | |

The mid and high vowels are nearly in complementary distribution, suggesting that Gitxsan once had a three-vowel system. Short mid vowels are emerging. Schwa only occurs in unstressed syllables. /eː/ and /oː/ have short allophones [e] and [o] in certain positions.

Gitxsan consonants
| | | Bilabial | Alveolar | | Palatal | Pre-velar | Labialized velar | Uvular | Glottal |
| | | Bilabial | median | lateral | Palatal | Pre-velar | Labialized velar | Uvular | Glottal |
|---|---|---|---|---|---|---|---|---|---|
| Stop | plain | p | t | | | kʲ ⟨k⟩ | kʷ ⟨kw⟩ | q ⟨ḵ⟩ | ʔ ⟨ꞌ⟩ |
| Stop | glottalized | pˀ | tˀ | | | kʲˀ ⟨kꞌ⟩ | kʷˀ ⟨kwꞌ⟩ | qˀ ⟨ḵꞌ⟩ | ʔ ⟨ꞌ⟩ |
| Affricate | plain | | t͡s ⟨ts⟩ | | | | | | |
| Affricate | glottalized | | t͡sˀ ⟨tsꞌ⟩ | t͡ɬˀ ⟨tlꞌ⟩ | | | | | |
| Fricative | | | s | ɬ ⟨hl⟩ | | xʲ ⟨x⟩ | xʷ ⟨xw⟩ | χ ⟨x̱⟩ | h |
| Sonorant | plain | m | n | l | j ⟨y⟩ | | w | | |
| Sonorant | glottalized | mˀ ⟨ꞌm⟩ | nˀ ⟨ꞌn⟩ | lˀ ⟨ꞌl⟩ | jˀ ⟨ꞌy⟩ | | wˀ ⟨ꞌw⟩ | | |

Voiceless stops have voiced allophones [b d d͡z ɡʲ ɡʷ ɢ]. The pre-velar obstruents become velar before /s/ and /l/. The lax glottalized stops "display a creaky voice quality at the margin of the vowel in pretonic (and syllable-final) environments." The glottalized consonants may be ejective in word-initial position, but otherwise "are characterized by glottal closure preceding the oral closure." The ejective allophones are lenis, and are therefore sometimes perceived as voiced. Lenis ejectives are unusual for the area, but are also found in neighboring Witsuwitʼen. The glottalized sonorants are preglottalized even in word-initial position. Glottalization ranges from a full glottal stop [ʔC] to creaky voice [C̰].
