= Quaal River =

River in British Columbia

The Quaal River is a river in the Kitimat Ranges of the Coast Mountains in British Columbia, Canada, flowing south into Kitkiata Inlet in the North Coast region.

== Indian reserves ==
Quaal Indian Reserve No. 3 of the Kitkaata Nation band government are located at the river's mouth at 53°39′00″N 129°20′00″W. Quaal Indian Reserve No. 3A is nearby, located on Kitkiata Inlet near the river's mouth at 53°38′00″N 129°17′00″W. Also on the inlet is Kitkahta Indian Reserve No. 1 at 53°38′00″N 129°16′00″W.

Also located at the mouth of the Quaal River is Gill Island Indian Reserve No. 2 at 53°39′00″N 129°17′00″W.

== See also ==
- List of rivers of British Columbia
