= Gitxsan =

Group of indigenous people in British Columbia, Canada

- Map of Gitx̱san Lax̱yip in British Columbia

Total population
- 5,680 (2016 census)

Regions with significant populations
- Canada; British Columbia

Languages
- English • Gitxsan

Religion
- Indigenous spirituality

Related ethnic groups
- Nisga'a

- People: Gitx̱san
- Language: Gitxsanimaax
- Country: Gitx̱san Lax̱yip

Gitxsan (also spelled Gitksan and Kitksan) are an Indigenous people in Canada whose home territory comprises most of the area known as the Skeena Country in English (Git means "people [of]" and Xsan is the Skeena River, literally "the River of Mist"). Gitksan territory encompasses approximately 35,000 km^{2} (14,000 sq mi) of land, from the basin of the upper Skeena River from about Legate Creek to the Skeena's headwaters and its surrounding tributaries.

Part of the Tsimshianic language group, their culture is considered to be part of the civilization of the Indigenous peoples of the Pacific Northwest Coast, although their territory lies in the Interior rather than on the Coast. They were at one time also known as the Interior Tsimshian, a term which also included the Nisga'a, the Gitxsan's neighbours to the north. Their neighbours to the west are the Tsimshian (a.k.a. the Coast Tsimshian) while to the east the Wetʼsuwetʼen, an Athapaskan people, with whom they have a long and deep relationship and shared political and cultural community.

== Society and culture ==
Gitxsan are a matrilineal society that consists of Frog, Eagle, Wolf, and Fireweed Clans. Each clan consists of a series of independent Houses (Wilp), each with their own High Chief, and traditional territories and fishing sites. Marriage within a clan is forbidden.

There are approximately 5,000 people British Columbia wide with many living in traditional Gitxsan territory. Many also live elsewhere in British Columbia, in places such as Terrace, Smithers, and in Vancouver, as well as around the world.

Eighty per cent of the people living on the lands surrounding Legate creek to the Skeena headwaters are Gitxsan ('People of the River Mist') and archaeological evidence supports a continuous habitation of at least 10,000 years. Their traditional language is called Gitxsanimaax.

A museum known as 'Ksan displaying some traditional and modern Gitksan art and history is located on the Gitanmaax reserve near Hazelton.

== Title and treaties ==
The aboriginal title rights of the Gitxsan and their neighbours, the Wetʼsuwetʼen, were affirmed by the Supreme Court of Canada in its 1997 Delgamuukw decision.

To date, a treaty agreement between the Gitxsan Nation and the Federal Government of Canada and Provincial Government of British Columbia has not been reached.

== Communities ==
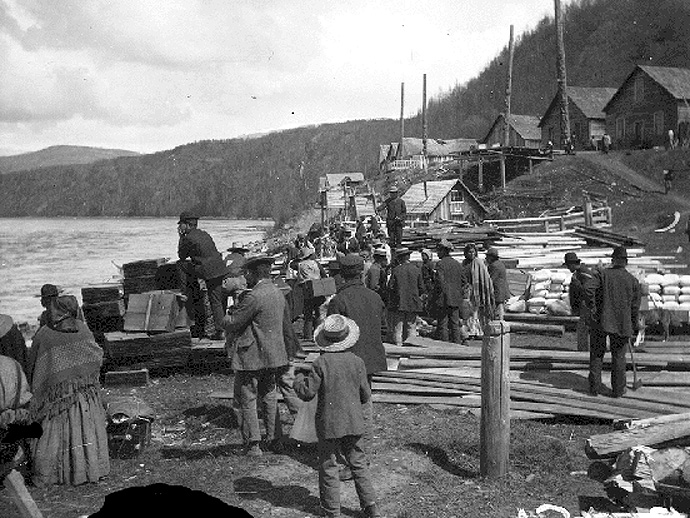
Gitxsan on the banks of the Skeena River at Hazelton, 1901

Some of the Gitxsan (Gitksan) villages are, divided by dialect:

Gitxsan dialect or Gitxsanimax̱, also known as Eastern Gitxsan dialect speaking bands in Gigeenix (eastern region):

- Old Hazelton (traditional name: Gitanmaax, Gitanmaax Band)
- Kispiox (traditional name: Anspa'yaxw, Kispiox Band Council)
- Glen Vowell (traditional name: Sik-e-Dakh, Glen Vowell Indian Band)

Gitsken dialect or Gitsenimx̱, also known as Western Gitksan dialect speaking bands in Gyeets (western region):

- Gitanyow (formerly Kitwancool, Gitanyow Band)
- Gitsegukla (formerly: Kitsegeucla, Gitsegukla Indian Band (formerly Kitsegugkla))
- Kitwanga (traditional name: Gitwangak, Gitwangak Indian Band (formerly Kitwanga)) - the Gitksan community of Cedarvale (traditional name: Minskinish or Meanskaniist) belong as Koonwat Indian Reserve No. 7 to the Gitwangak.

== Notable people of Gitxsan descent ==
- Cindy Blackstock
- Simon Gunanoot, long sought-after fugitive later cleared of wrongdoing
- Walter Harris, hereditary chief and artist/carver
- Doreen Jensen, artist, carver, activist and educator
- Judith P. Morgan, painter
- Angela Sterritt, journalist
- Neil J. Sterritt, author and activist
- Billy ThunderKloud, singer/entertainer, Nashville recording artist, 1975 Outstanding Indian of the Year, hereditary chief
- Nathaniel P. Wilkerson, artist/carver, engineer, programmer/developer
- Jean Virginia Sampare, an abducted girl missing from Gitsegukla, British Columbia, Canada

== Bibliography ==
- Adams, John W. (1973) The Gitksan Potlatch: Population Flux, Resource Ownership and Reciprocity. Toronto: Holt, Rinehart, and Winston of Canada.
- Barbeau, Marius (1928) The Downfall of Temlaham. Toronto: MacMillan.
- Barbeau, Marius (1929) Totem Poles of the Gitksan, Upper Skeena River, British Columbia. Ottawa: Canada, Department of Mines.
- Beynon, William (2000) Potlatch at Gitsegukla: William Beynon’s 1945 Field Notebooks. Ed. by Margaret Anderson and Marjorie Halpin. Vancouver: U.B.C. Press.
- Bookbuildes of 'Ksan (1977) We-Gyet Wanders On: Legends of the Northwest. Saanichton, B.C.: Hancock House Publishers.
- Cove, John J. (1982) "The Gitksan Traditional Concept of Land Ownership." Anthropologica, vol. 24, no. 1, pp. 3–17.
- Daly, Richard (2005) Our Box Was Full: An Ethnography for the Delgamuukw Plaintiffs. Vancouver: UBC Press.
- Duff, Wilson (ed.) (1959) Histories, Territories and Laws of the Kitwancool. Victoria: Royal British Columbia Museum.
- Galois, Robert, and Neil J. Sterritt, (1998) Tribal Boundaries in the Nass Watershed. Vancouver: U.B.C. Press.
- Gibson, John Frederic (1972) A Small and Charming World. Toronto: Collins Publishers.
- Glavin, Terry (1990) A Death Feast in Dimlahamid. Vancouver: New Star Books.
- Harris, Christie (1975) Sky Man on the Totem Pole? New York: Atheneum.
- Harris, Kenneth B. (1974) Visitors Who Never Left: The Origin of the People of Damelahamid. Vancouver: University of British Columbia Press.
- Monet, Don, and Ardythe Wilson (1992) Colonialism on Trial: Indigenous Land Rights and the Gitksan and Wet’suwet’en Sovereignty Case. Philadelphia: New Society Publishers.
- Sterritt, Neil J., (2020) Mapping My Way Home: A Gitxsan History. Smithers, BC: Creekstone Press.
- Russell, Roy (2015) Feast: A Gitksan Story
