= Kispiox Band Council =

The Kispiox Band Council are a First Nation based near the meeting of the Skeena and Bulkley Rivers in northwestern B.C. They are members of the Gitxsan Treaty Society.

== Chief and Councillors ==
The following Band Council members were elected to serve a two-year term from July 2021 to July 2023:

- Chief Councillor: Cameron Stevens
- Councillors: Stuart Barnes, Jordan Muldoe, Gwen Simms, Kevin Stevens, Lance Stevens, Victor Stevens, Denzel Sutherland-Wilson, Kolin Sutherland-Wilson, Cheryl Williams.

== Demographics ==
The Kispiox Nation has 1,495 members.
