= Kitasoo/Xaixais First Nation =

Kitasoo Xai'xais Nation
- Band No. 540
- People: Kitasoo (Tsimshian) / Xai'xais
- Headquarters: Klemtu
- Province: British Columbia

Land
- Main reserve: Kitasoo 1
- Land area: 7.2 km^{2} (2.8 sq mi)

Population (2024)
- On reserve: 241
- On other land: 5
- Off reserve: 245
- Total population: 491

Government
- Chief: Douglas Neasloss

Tribal Council
- Wuikinuxv-Kitasoo-Nuxalk Tribal Council

Website
- klemtu.com

The Kitasoo/Xaixais First Nation, also known as the Kitasoo/Xaixais Nation, is the band government of the First Nations people of Klemtu, British Columbia, Canada. The band comprises two ethnic groups who share an ancient alliance, the Kitasoo, a Tsimshian group, and the Xai'xais, a North-Wakashan speaking group. The government is a member of the Wuikinuxv-Kitasoo-Nuxalk Tribal Council and a member of the Tsimshian First Nations treaty council.

== Indian reserves ==
Indian reserves under the administration of the Kitasoo/Xaixais Nation are:

- Canoona 2, on Princess Royal Island, north shore of Graham Reach, 219.30 ha.
- Dil-ma-sow 5, on Kent Islet southwest of the Princess Royal Islands, 1.90 ha.
- Gander Island 14, on one of the islands of the Moore Group off the west coast of Aristazabal Island in Hecate Strait, 121.40 ha.
- Goo-ewe 8, on Grant Anchorage, north side of Price Island, 2.0 ha.
- Kdad-eesh 4, on west shore of Aristazabal Island, 2.0 ha.
- Kinmakanksk 6, on the southwest shore of Princess Royal Island on Laredo Channel, 11.70 ha.
- Kitasoo 1, on east shore of Swindle Island at Klemtu, 334.70 ha.
- Lattkaloup 9, on Princess Royal Island at mouth of Fowles Creek, Laredo Inlet, 0.40. ha.
- Mary Cove 12, on Mary Cove, west shore of Roderick Island, 1.0 ha.
- Oatswish 13, on most northerly tip of Mussel Inlet, north of Mathieson Channel, Milbanke Sound, 2.10 ha.
- Quckwa 7, on Kitasu Bay, west shore of Swindle Island, 6.10 ha.
- Saint Joe 10, on Princess Royal Island at outlet of Bloomfield Lake into Laredo Inlet, 0.50 ha.
- Skilak 14, on Griffin Passage, east side of Roderick Island, 9.70 ha.
- Ulthakoush 11, at head of Laredo Inlet on Princess Royal Island, 2.40 ha.
- Weeteeam 3, at mouth of Kdelmashan Creek, southwest shore of Aristazabal Island, 3.20 ha.

== Chief and Councillors ==
Position	Name	Term start	Term end
Chief Councillor	Douglas Neasloss	07/13/2023	07/12/2025
Councillor	Darren Edgar	07/13/2023	07/12/2025
Councillor	Christopher McKnight	07/13/2025	07/12/2025
Councillor	Harvey Robinson	07/13/2023	07/12/2025
Councillor	Isaiah Robinson	07/13/2023	07/12/2025
Source: Government of Canada

== BC Treaty Process ==
The Kitasoo/Xaixais First Nation is at Stage 4 in the British Columbia Treaty Process.

== Demographics ==
=== Population ===
As of March 2024, the Kitasoo/Xaixais First Nation has a registered population of 493 (inclusive of individuals living off reserve). 242 members of the registered population live on-reserve (49.1% of total population) while 245 individuals live off-reserve (49.7%).

In the 2016 Canadian Census, the officially-recorded on-reserve population was 290, which represented a 3.6% increase from the 2006 census. 80 people were recorded as aged 0-19, 195 people were aged 20-64, and 25 people were aged 65 or older. (Note: To prevent data being used to identify specific individuals, Statistics Canada applies random rounding to census data, where all figures are rounded (either up or down) to a multiple of 5 (or in some cases 10).)
