= Gitsegukla Indian Band =

Gitxsan band government in British Columbia, Canada

Gitsegukla
- Band No. 531
- People: Gitxsan
- Headquarters: Gitsegukla
- Province: British Columbia

Land
- Main reserve: Gitsegukla 1
- Reserves: Andimaul 1; Gitsegukla Logging 3; New Gitsegukla 2
- Land area: 19.31 km^{2} (7.46 sq mi)

Population (2025)
- On reserve: 388
- On other land: 66
- Off reserve: 657
- Total population: 1111

Government
- Chief: Annie Howard

Website
- www.gitsegukla.net

The Gitsegukla Indian Band (formerly Kitsegukla) are a First Nation based at the community of Gitsegukla (formerly Skeena Crossing) near the meeting of the Skeena and Gitsegukla River in northwestern B.C.

== Chief and Councillors ==
The Chief and Councillors listed below were elected in 2021, for a term that will end in 2024:

Chief: Ann Howard

Councilors: Wendy Wesley, Brian Wesley Sr., Julia Walker, Crystal Smith, Thelma Marsden, Jennifer Gladstone-Howard, Mel Aksidan, Randy Russell

== Demographics ==
INAC number, 535 the Gitsegukla Indian Band has 914 members.
