= Tsimshianic languages =

Endangered language family of British Columbia and Alaska

Tsimshianic
- Tsmksian
- Geographic distribution: British Columbia, Alaska
- Linguistic classification: Penutian ?: Tsimshianic
- Subdivisions: Maritime Tsimshian; Nass–Gitksan

Language codes
- Glottolog: tsim1258
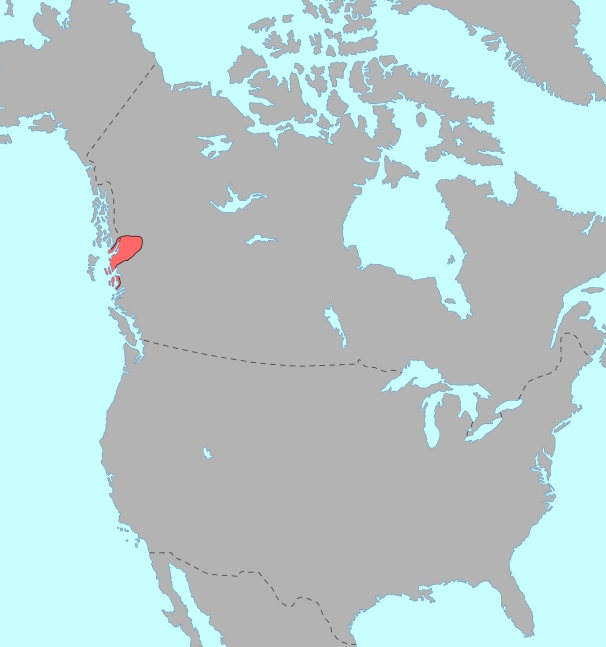
- Pre-contact distribution of Tsimshianic languages

The Tsimshianic languages are a family of languages spoken in northwestern British Columbia and in Southeast Alaska on Annette Island and Ketchikan. All Tsimshianic languages are endangered, some with only around 400 speakers. Only around 2,170 people of the ethnic Tsimshian /ˈsɪmʃiən/ population in Canada still speak a Tsimshian language; about 50 of the 1,300 Tsimshian people living in Alaska still speak Coast Tsimshian. Tsimshianic languages are considered by most linguists to be an independent language family, with four main languages: Coast Tsimshian, Southern Tsimshian, Nisg̱a’a, and Gitksan.

The Tsimshianic languages were included by Edward Sapir in his Penutian hypothesis, which is currently not widely accepted, at least in its full form. The Penutian connections of Tsimshianic have been reevaluated by Marie-Lucie Tarpent, who finds the idea probable, though others hold that the Tsimshianic family is not closely related to any other North American language.

== Family division ==
Map of the historical distribution of the Tsimshianic languages in British Columbia and Alaska.

Tsimshianic consists of 4 lects:

- Tsimshianic
  - Tsimshian (also known as Maritime Tsimshianic, Lower Tsimshian, Northern Tsimshian)
    - Coast Tsimshian (also known as Tsimshian proper, Sm'algyax̣, Sm'algax)
    - †Southern Tsimshian (also known as Sgüüx̣s, Ski:xs, Old Klemtu)
  - Nass–Gitksan (also known as Interior Tsimshianic, Inland Tsimshianic)
    - Nisga’a (also known as Nisqa’a, Nisg̱a’a, Nishga, Nisgha, Niska, Nass, Nishka)
    - Gitksan (also known as Gitxsan, Gitksanimx̣)

Coast Tsimshian is spoken along the lower Skeena River in Northwestern British Columbia, on some neighbouring islands, and to the north at New Metlakatla, Alaska. Southern Tsimshian was spoken on an island quite far south of the Skeena River in the village of Klemtu; however, it became extinct in 2013 with the death of the last speaker. Nisga’a is spoken along the Nass River. Gitksan is spoken along the Upper Skeena River around Hazelton and other areas.

Nisga’a and Gitksan are very closely related and are usually considered dialects of the same language by linguists. However, speakers from both groups consider themselves ethnically separate from each other and from the Tsimshian and thus consider Nisga’a and Gitksan to be separate languages. Coast and Southern Tsimshian are also often regarded as dialects of the same language.

As of 2023, Tsimshian courses are available at the University of Alaska Southeast.

== Phonology ==
Consonantal inventory of Proto-Tsimshian:

		Labial	Dental		Palatal	Velar	Labio- velar	Uvular	Labio- uvular	Glottal
Non-continuous obstruent	simple	*p	*t	*ts		*k	*kʷ	*q	*qʷ	*ʔ, *ʔʷ
Non-continuous obstruent	glottalized	*pʼ	*tʼ	*tsʼ		*kʼ	*kʷʼ	*qʼ	*qʷʼ	
Fricative			*s, *ɬ			*x		*χ	*χʷ	*h, *hʷ
Approximant	simple		*l		*j		*w			
Approximant	glottalized		*lˀ		*jˀ		*wˀ			
Nasal	simple	*m	*n							
Nasal	glottalized	*mˀ	*nˀ							

== See also ==
- Tsimshian
- Nisga'a
- Gitxsan

== Bibliography ==
- Boas, Franz. (1902). Tsimshian Texts. Washington: Bureau of American Ethnology. Bulletin 27.
- Boas, Franz. (1911). "Tsimshian." Handbook of American Indian Languages Bulletin No. 40, part I, pp. 287–422.
- Mithun, Marianne. (1999). The Languages of Native North America. Cambridge: Cambridge University Press. ISBN 0-521-23228-7 (hbk).
- Tarpent, Marie-Lucie. (1997). "Tsimshianic and Penutian: Problems, Methods, Results, and Implications." International Journal of American Linguistics 63.52-244.
