= Klemtu =

Human settlement in Canada

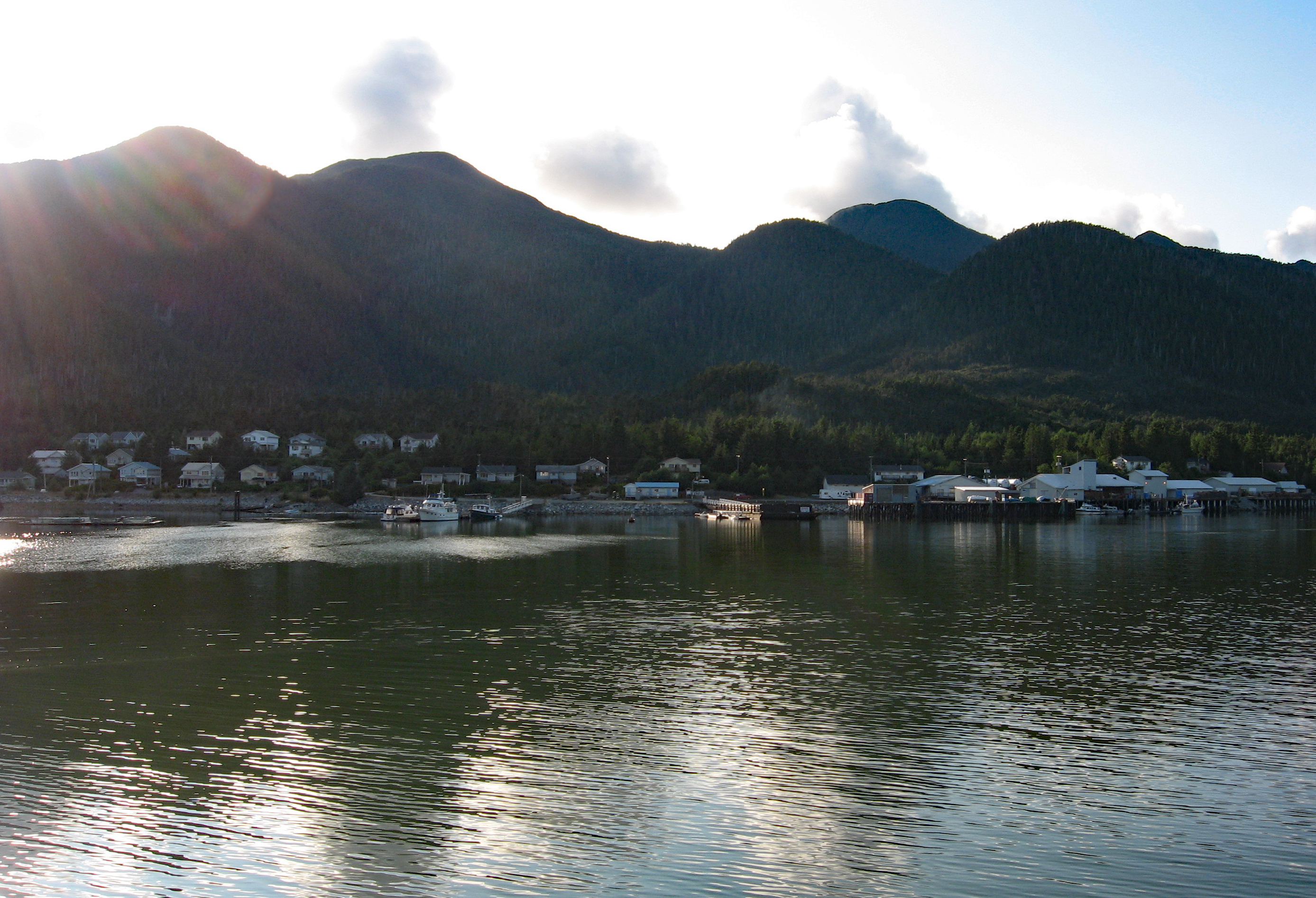
Klemtu, British Columbia

Klemtu is an unincorporated community on Swindle Island in the coastal fjords of British Columbia, Canada. It is located on Kitasoo Indian Reserve No. 1.

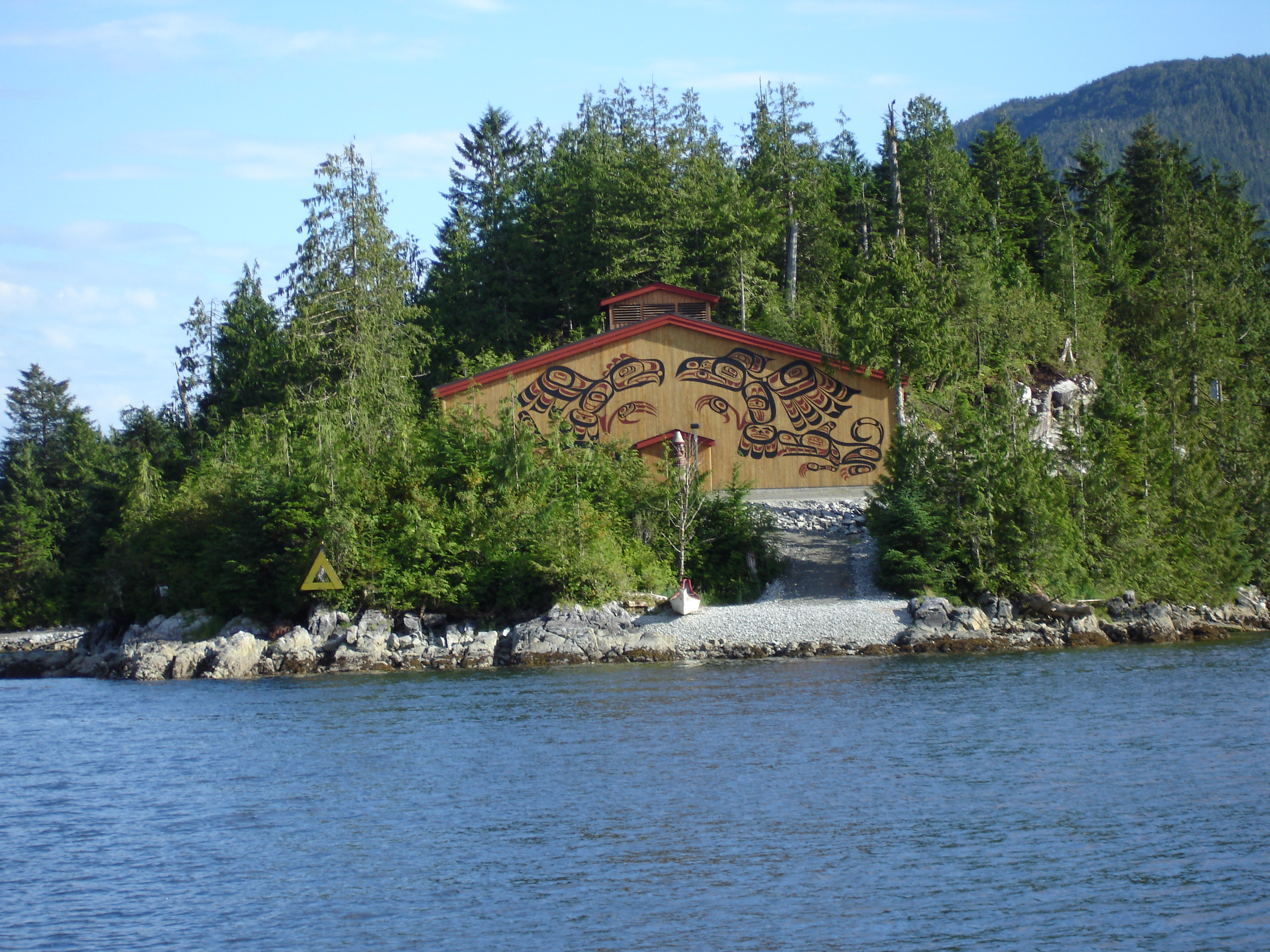
The Big House in Klemtu

Klemtu is the home of the Kitasoo tribe of Tsimshians, originally from Kitasu Bay, and the Xai'xais of Kynoch Inlet, extends eastward from Queen Charlotte Sound, approximately at 52.767462°N 128.10688°W. It is adjacent to the Fiordland Conservancy. These two tribes live together as, and are jointly governed by, the Kitasoo/Xai'xais Nation. Traditional languages spoken at Klemtu are the southern dialect of the Tsimshian language, called Southern Tsimshian, and Xaixais, a dialect of the Heiltsuk language. In religious affiliation, the community is dominated by the United Church of Canada.

The government of the Kitasoo/Xai'xais Nation is a member government of the Wuikinuxv-Kitasoo Xai’xais-Nuxalk Tribal Council.

The population of Klemtu in 1983 was 269. As of 2007 the population of Klemtu was 505.

== Name origin ==
An alternate older name for Klemtu is Kitasoo. it was also known as China Hat due to the shape of Cone Island, which protects it from the open water. The name Klemtu is from the Coast Tsimshian language "Klemdoo-oolk," meaning "impassable".

== Climate ==
Climate data for Boat Bluff (Note: Boat Bluff is located approximately 6 kilometres (3.7 mi) north of Klemtu.) (1981–2010)
Month	Jan	Feb	Mar	Apr	May	Jun	Jul	Aug	Sep	Oct	Nov	Dec	Year
Record high humidex	15.1	12.2	17.6	21.1	27.5	30.1	36.2	30.5	27.9	23.4	13.3	12.0	36.2
Record high °C (°F)	18.0 (64.4)	17.0 (62.6)	20.0 (68.0)	25.5 (77.9)	31.5 (88.7)	33.5 (92.3)	32.5 (90.5)	33.0 (91.4)	30.0 (86.0)	21.0 (69.8)	16.5 (61.7)	15.5 (59.9)	33.5 (92.3)
Mean daily maximum °C (°F)	6.0 (42.8)	6.6 (43.9)	8.3 (46.9)	10.9 (51.6)	14.1 (57.4)	16.6 (61.9)	18.7 (65.7)	19.0 (66.2)	16.2 (61.2)	11.7 (53.1)	7.6 (45.7)	5.8 (42.4)	11.8 (53.2)
Daily mean °C (°F)	3.6 (38.5)	3.9 (39.0)	5.3 (41.5)	7.4 (45.3)	10.4 (50.7)	12.9 (55.2)	14.7 (58.5)	15.1 (59.2)	12.8 (55.0)	9.0 (48.2)	5.2 (41.4)	3.6 (38.5)	8.7 (47.6)
Mean daily minimum °C (°F)	1.2 (34.2)	1.2 (34.2)	2.2 (36.0)	3.9 (39.0)	6.6 (43.9)	9.0 (48.2)	10.8 (51.4)	11.1 (52.0)	9.4 (48.9)	6.4 (43.5)	2.9 (37.2)	1.4 (34.5)	5.5 (41.9)
Record low °C (°F)	−16.0 (3.2)	−17.5 (0.5)	−14.0 (6.8)	−1.0 (30.2)	−1.0 (30.2)	4.0 (39.2)	5.5 (41.9)	6.5 (43.7)	4.0 (39.2)	−7.6 (18.3)	−20.2 (−4.4)	−14.0 (6.8)	−20.2 (−4.4)
Record low wind chill	−18	−15	−10	0	0	0	0	0	0	0	−11	−21	−21
Average precipitation mm (inches)	601.9 (23.70)	428.5 (16.87)	428.4 (16.87)	389.1 (15.32)	257.7 (10.15)	226.2 (8.91)	179.8 (7.08)	231.4 (9.11)	366.0 (14.41)	631.8 (24.87)	677.8 (26.69)	628.1 (24.73)	5,046.7 (198.71)
Average rainfall mm (inches)	574.5 (22.62)	400.3 (15.76)	414.6 (16.32)	386.9 (15.23)	257.7 (10.15)	226.2 (8.91)	179.8 (7.08)	231.4 (9.11)	366.0 (14.41)	630.0 (24.80)	670.1 (26.38)	606.2 (23.87)	4,943.7 (194.64)
Average snowfall cm (inches)	27.4 (10.8)	28.3 (11.1)	13.9 (5.5)	2.3 (0.9)	0.0 (0.0)	0.0 (0.0)	0.0 (0.0)	0.0 (0.0)	0.0 (0.0)	1.9 (0.7)	7.6 (3.0)	21.9 (8.6)	103.3 (40.6)
Average precipitation days (≥ 0.2 mm)	23.3	19.6	22.9	21.4	19.7	17.8	16.7	17.4	19.4	24.7	24.9	24.9	252.7
Average snowy days (≥ 0.2 cm)	4.0	3.7	3.3	1.0	0.0	0.0	0.0	0.0	0.0	0.3	2.0	4.2	18.5
Source: Environment Canada

== See also ==
- List of canneries in British Columbia
- List of Indian reserves in British Columbia

== Bibliography ==
- Inglis, Gordon B., et al. (1990) "Tsimshians of British Columbia since 1900." In Handbook of North American Indians, Volume 7: Northwest Coast, pp. 285–293. Washington: Smithsonian Institution.
- Miller, Jay (1981) "Moieties and Cultural Amnesia: Manipulation of Knowledge in a Pacific Northwest Coast Native Community," Arctic Anthropology, vol. 18, no. 1, pp. 23–32.
- Miller, Jay (1982) "Tsimshian Moieties and Other Clarifications," Northwest Anthropological Research Notes, vol. 16, no. 2, pp. 148–164.
