= Gitanmaax Band =

Gitxsan band government in British Columbia, Canada

Gitanmaax
- Band No. 531
- People: Gitxsan
- Headquarters: Hazelton
- Province: British Columbia

Land
- Main reserve: Gitanmaax 1
- Reserves: Anlaw 4; Kisgegas; Ksoo-gun-ya 2A; Tsitsk 3
- Land area: 23.778 km^{2} (9.181 sq mi)

Population (2025)
- On reserve: 690
- On other land: 106
- Off reserve: 1856
- Total population: 2652

Government
- Chief: Roger Sterritt

Tribal Council
- Gitksan Local Government Services Society

Website
- www.gitanmaax.com

The Gitanmaax Band is a band government of the Gitxsan people, based near the meeting of the Skeena and Bulkley Rivers, adjacent to the village of Hazelton and 5 km west of New Hazelton, in northwestern British Columbia, Canada. Gitanmaax is the traditional name of the winter village which become the current reserve. Gitanmaax means "People who fish by torchlight" in the upriver Gigeenix Dialect of the Gitsanimaax language.

== Demographics ==
The Gitanmaax Band Council has 2,147 members.
