= Moore Islands =

Island group in British Columbia, Canada

The Moore Islands, also known as the Moore Group, are a group of small islands in the North Coast region of British Columbia, Canada. They are located in Hecate Strait to the west of Aristazabal Island.

Gander Island Indian Reserve No. 14 of the Hartley Bay Indian Band is located on the island of the same name within the group, (300.0 acres) at 52°40′00″N 129°25′00″W.
