= Kispiox =

Gitxsan village in British Columbia

Coordinates: 55.350°N 127.683°W

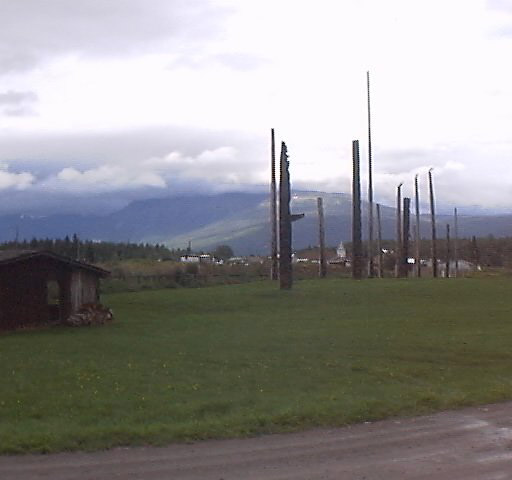
Kispiox, BC

Kispiox is a Gitxsan (often known also as Gitksan, due to eastern and western dialects) village of approximately 550 in the Kispiox Valley, at the confluence of the Kispiox and Skeena Rivers in British Columbia. Located 13 km (8 mi) north of Hazelton, the community is situated within the Kispiox Indian reserve and is managed by the Kispiox Band Council.

Kispiox is perhaps most known to outsiders for its totem poles, some of which were the subject of Emily Carr paintings in the early 20th century. The totem poles of Kispiox were featured as part of an episode of the 1975 David Attenborough documentary series The Tribal Eye. The episode, "Crooked Beak of Heaven", focused on traditional customs and art of the Gitxsan and neighbouring tribes.

Additionally, the Kispiox River has been host to two world-record steelhead catches: a 33-pounder and a 36-pounder. Kispiox has remained a favourite tourist attraction for its historical village, traditional artifacts and fishing.

The original and traditional name of Kispiox Village is "Anspay'axw", loosely translated from the Gitxsan language; this means "The Hiding Place".

== Notable people from Kispiox ==
Alvin Weget Elder, Hereditary Chief Gitluudahlxw

- Walter Harris, O.C., Artist and Gitxsan Hereditary Chief
- Delgamuukw Earl Muldoe, Gitxsan Hereditary Chief
