= 'Ksan =

Historical village and living museum near Hazelton, British Columbia

Coordinates: 55°14′58″N 127°40′47″W

ʼKsan
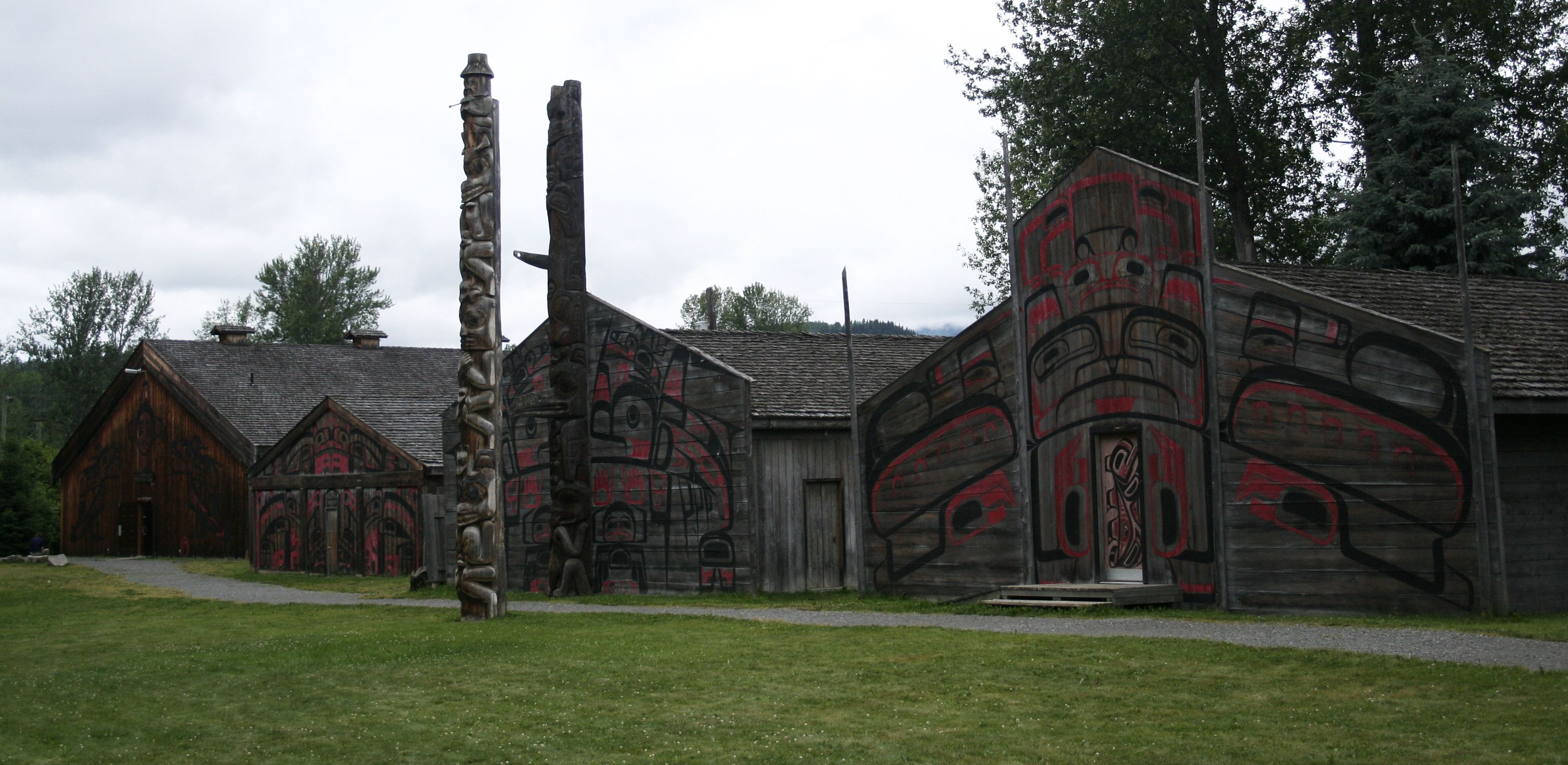
- Location: near Hazelton, British Columbia
- Type: Historical village and living museum
- Website: www.ksan.org

ʼKsan is a historical village and living museum of the Gitxsan Indigenous people in the Skeena Country of Northwestern British Columbia, Canada. ʼKsan is located near Hazelton at the confluence of the Skeena and Bulkley Rivers on Gitxsan territory.

== History ==
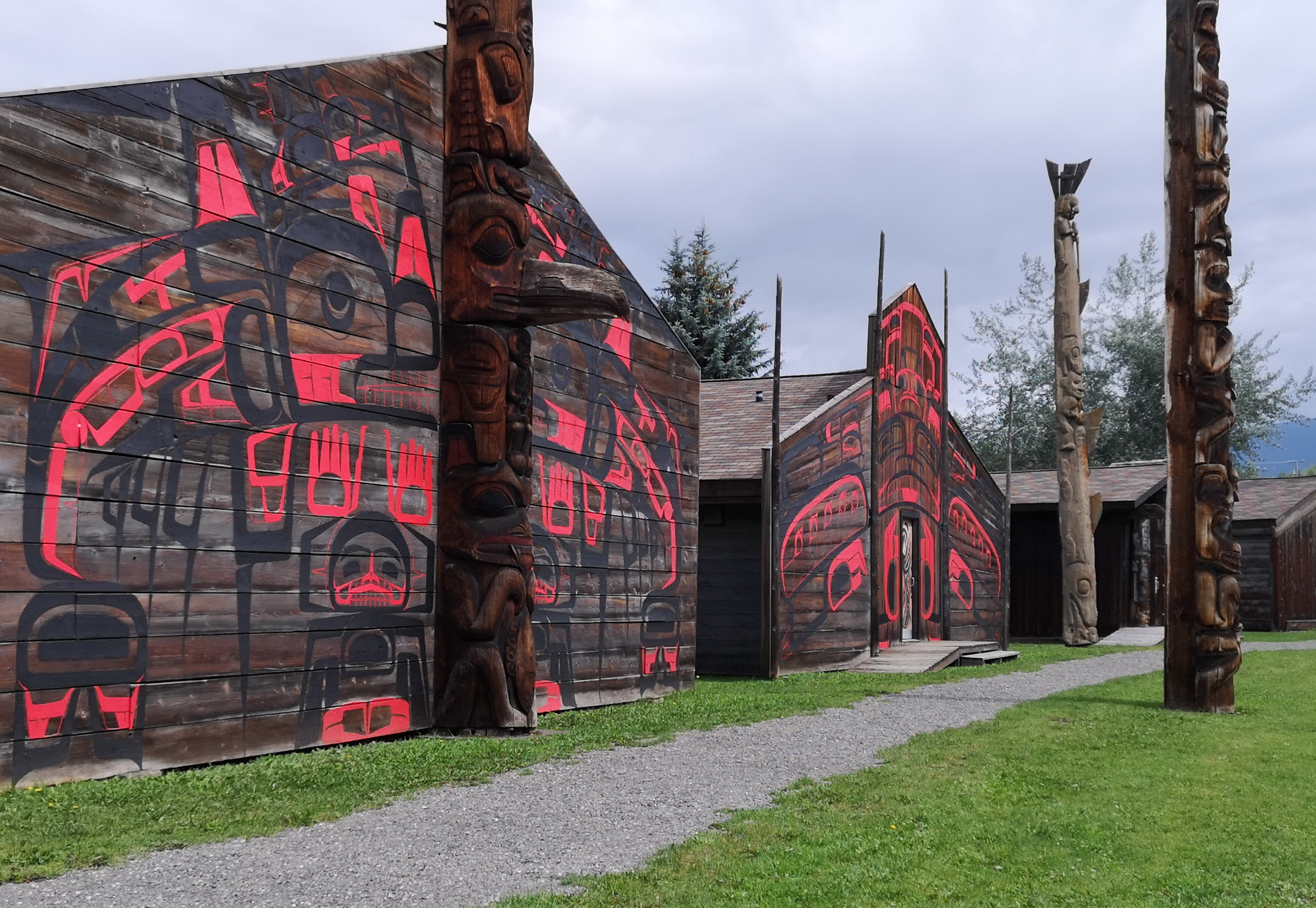
The living museum is open to visitors.

ʼKsan was founded before Hazelton was in 1866, and was populated by the Gitxsan Indigenous people.

== See also ==
- Hagwilgyet
- Kitwanga Fort National Historic Site
- Old Hazelton, British Columbia (Gitanmaax)
- X̱á:ytem
