= Hartley Bay =

First Nations community in British Columbia, Canada

Coordinates: 53.2530°N 129.1505°W

Location of Hartley Bay in British Columbia

Hartley Bay, B.C. 2003

Hartley Bay, B.C. ca 1980

Hartley Bay is a First Nations community on the coast of British Columbia. The village is located at the mouth of Douglas Channel, about 630 kilometres (390 mi) north of Vancouver and 145 kilometres (90 mi) south of Prince Rupert. It is an isolated village accessible only by air and water with a population of 200.

It is home to the Gitga'ata (sometimes Gitga'at or Gitk'a'ata), which means "People of the Cane." The Gitga'at are members of the Tsimshian nation. As of 2013, 167 band members live on the reserve and 533 members live off reserve in Prince Rupert, Vancouver or other regions. The community is served by seaplane and ferry from Prince Rupert. A distinctive feature of the community is the wooden boardwalks which are used rather than gravel roads.

== History and culture ==
The Gitga'at geographical name for the bay where the village is situated is Txałgiu. This name was anglicised to Kalkayu when Indian reserves were formed in 1889, these being Kulkayu (Hartley Bay) Indian Reserve No. 4 and Kulkayu (Hartley Bay) Indian Reserve No. 4A (the community is physically on No. 4A). The ancient winter village of the Gitga'at, known today as Lax Galts'ap or "Old Town," is located 12 miles (19 km) north on Douglas Channel. There was also a village site in a small bay on Gil Island, not far from where the Queen of the North sank. Capt. George Vancouver anchored there in 1793, where he observed remains of houses. Both of these ancient sites continue to be used by the Gitga'at today, as they do other important resource and cultural sites within their traditional territories.

Hartley Bay was established and settled in 1887 after a number of families left Metlakalta, B.C., where they had joined other Tsimshian people at the utopian mission begun by the lay minister William Duncan. When Duncan and his Tsimshian supporters moved to New Metlakatla, Alaska, many of the Gitga'at returned to their traditional territories. However, they chose to settle at Txałgiu rather than their ancient village.

For most of the twentieth century, the fishing industry sustained the people of Hartley Bay. Today, however, with the decline of the fishing industry, employment has diversified, with tourism playing a significant role. For example, several Hartley Bay residents work at nearby fishing lodges during the summer as guides. Air service is through Hartley Bay Water Aerodrome.

== The sinking of the Queen of the North in 2006 ==
On March 22, 2006, the people of Hartley Bay helped rescue the passengers of the BC Ferries vessel Queen of the North, by arriving before the Canadian Coast Guard. The town community centre was turned into a rescue centre with the small community providing aid. According to Betsy Reece, "everyone not out on the water was helping keep people warm and fed at the cultural centre."

The town's populace received the Governor General's Commendation for Outstanding Service on May 3, 2006, for "initiative, selflessness and an extraordinary commitment to the well-being of others" in the rescue; the honour also cites the town's "tremendous spirit and the remarkable example it has set".

== Climate ==
Under the Köppen climate classification, Hartley Bay features an Oceanic climate with chilly winters and mild summers. The area receives a copious amount of precipitation throughout the course of the year, averaging roughly 4500 mm annually. While the area experiences rain throughout the year, the summer months of June, July and August are noticeably drier than other times of the year. Precipitation mostly falls as rain, even during the winter months, although the area does experience snowfall averaging roughly 200 cm per year.

Climate data for Hartley Bay
Month	Jan	Feb	Mar	Apr	May	Jun	Jul	Aug	Sep	Oct	Nov	Dec	Year
Record high °C (°F)	13.0 (55.4)	15.0 (59.0)	19.5 (67.1)	24.5 (76.1)	29.0 (84.2)	31.0 (87.8)	32.5 (90.5)	33.3 (91.9)	32.2 (90.0)	20.0 (68.0)	14.4 (57.9)	13.0 (55.4)	33.3 (91.9)
Mean daily maximum °C (°F)	4.1 (39.4)	5.3 (41.5)	8.2 (46.8)	10.9 (51.6)	15.3 (59.5)	17.9 (64.2)	20.2 (68.4)	20.1 (68.2)	17.3 (63.1)	11.6 (52.9)	6.4 (43.5)	4.1 (39.4)	11.8 (53.2)
Daily mean °C (°F)	1.5 (34.7)	2.5 (36.5)	4.7 (40.5)	6.7 (44.1)	10.6 (51.1)	13.3 (55.9)	15.5 (59.9)	15.4 (59.7)	13.1 (55.6)	8.4 (47.1)	3.9 (39.0)	1.9 (35.4)	8.1 (46.6)
Mean daily minimum °C (°F)	−1.1 (30.0)	−0.4 (31.3)	1.1 (34.0)	2.5 (36.5)	5.7 (42.3)	8.6 (47.5)	10.8 (51.4)	10.7 (51.3)	8.8 (47.8)	5.3 (41.5)	1.4 (34.5)	−0.5 (31.1)	4.4 (39.9)
Record low °C (°F)	−14.5 (5.9)	−16.0 (3.2)	−11.7 (10.9)	−3.0 (26.6)	−0.6 (30.9)	2.0 (35.6)	2.5 (36.5)	3.5 (38.3)	1.0 (33.8)	−8.0 (17.6)	−22.0 (−7.6)	−16.7 (1.9)	−22.0 (−7.6)
Average precipitation mm (inches)	518.4 (20.41)	426.5 (16.79)	327.1 (12.88)	301.2 (11.86)	227.8 (8.97)	182.2 (7.17)	159.4 (6.28)	192.0 (7.56)	405.2 (15.95)	686.4 (27.02)	693.9 (27.32)	553.1 (21.78)	4,673.2 (183.98)
Average rainfall mm (inches)	465.1 (18.31)	376.9 (14.84)	306.8 (12.08)	297.7 (11.72)	227.8 (8.97)	182.2 (7.17)	159.4 (6.28)	192.0 (7.56)	405.2 (15.95)	685.6 (26.99)	664.8 (26.17)	498.4 (19.62)	4,461.8 (175.66)
Average snowfall cm (inches)	53.3 (21.0)	49.6 (19.5)	20.4 (8.0)	3.5 (1.4)	0.0 (0.0)	0.0 (0.0)	0.0 (0.0)	0.0 (0.0)	0.0 (0.0)	0.8 (0.3)	29.1 (11.5)	54.7 (21.5)	211.3 (83.2)
Average precipitation days (≥ 0.2 mm)	18.1	17.3	17.9	17.4	14.5	14.4	12.1	10.8	15.2	22.5	24.4	20.5	205.0
Average rainy days (≥ 0.2 mm)	15.5	14.3	16.6	17.3	14.5	14.4	12.1	10.8	15.2	22.4	22.9	17.2	193.1
Average snowy days (≥ 0.2 cm)	6.2	5.2	2.7	1.9	0.0	0.0	0.0	0.0	0.0	0.5	4.9	6.6	27.8

== See also ==
- List of Indian reserves in British Columbia
