= Kitwanga =

Kitwanga Gitwangak
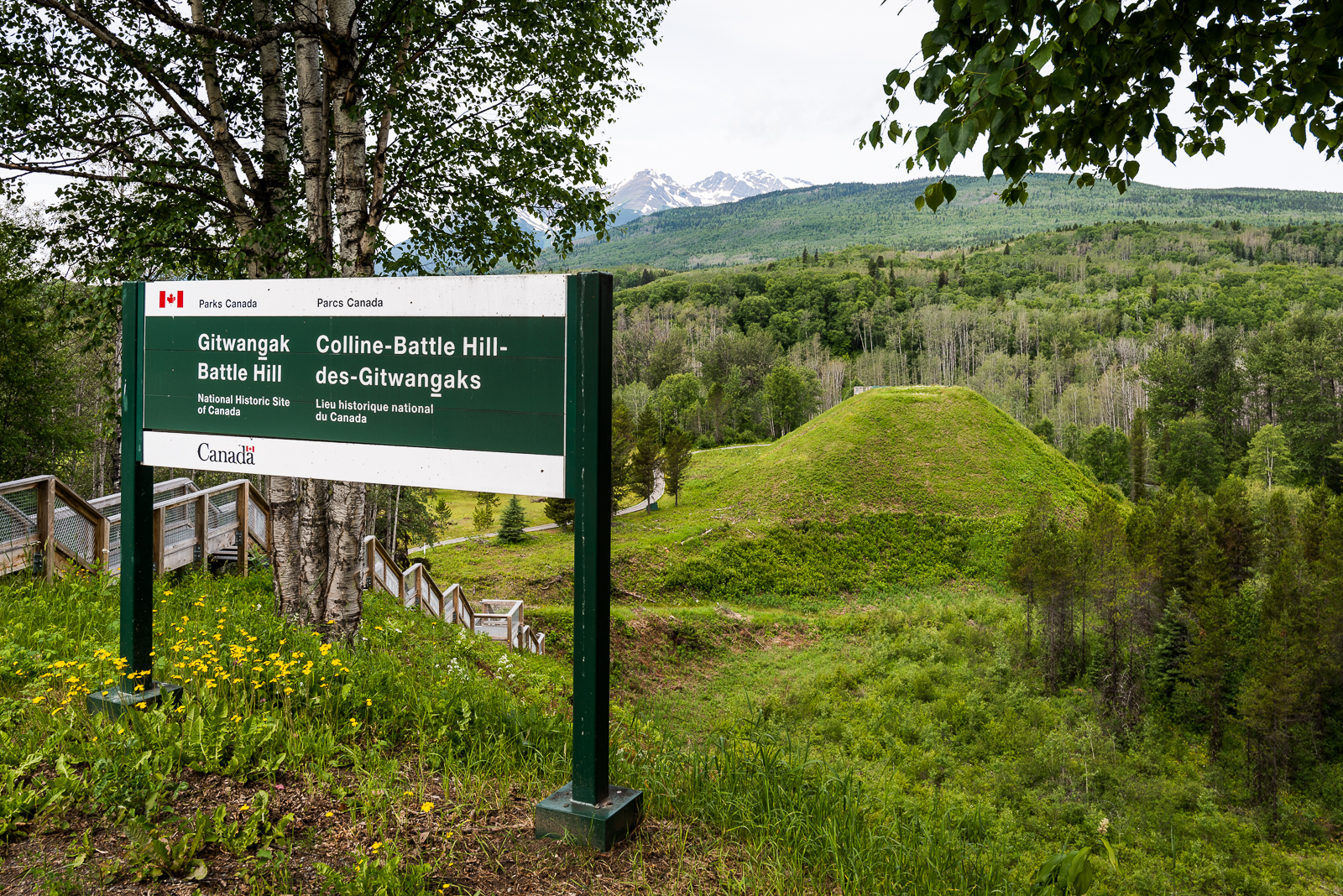
- Gitwangak Battle Hill, Kitwanga, 2017.

- Location of Kitwanga.
- Coordinates: 55°05′59″N 128°04′05″W
- Country: Canada
- Province: British Columbia
- Region: Skeena
- Regional district: Kitimat–Stikine

Area
  - Total: 17.6 km^{2} (6.8 sq mi)

Population (2021)(indigenous only)
  - Total: 450
  - Density: 26/km^{2} (66/sq mi)
- Time zone: UTC−07:00 (PT)
- Area codes: 250, 778, 236, & 672
- Highways: Highway 16 (TCH); Highway 37
- Waterways: Skeena River; Kitwanga River

Kitwanga /ˈkɪtwəŋɡə/ or Gitwangak is in the Skeena region of west central British Columbia. Among the Hazelton and Bulkley Mountain Ranges, the place is on the north shore of the Skeena River, east of the Kitwanga River confluence. On BC Highway 37, northeast of the junction with BC Highway 16, the locality is by road about 115 kilometres (71 mi) northwest of Smithers, 99 kilometres (62 mi) northeast of Terrace, and 212 kilometres (132 mi) southeast of Stewart.

The Gitwangak Band Council governs the First Nations portion. Adjacent to the northeast, the freehold part is an unincorporated community.

== Name origin ==
Meaning "place of rabbits", Gitwangak was formerly called Kitwanga, with variations such as Gitwangar, Kitwangagh, or Kitwangar.

== Gitwangak Battle Hill ==
According to legend, Lutraisuh, daughter of a Gitxsan noble family, was kidnapped by a Haida war party. After bearing three sons to a blind chief, she escaped with the surviving third son. The boy, called Nekt, grew up to become a fierce warrior. He killed a grizzly bear, lined the hide with sheets of slate, and created a simple suit of armor. His people built the hilltop stronghold from which they waged war. His enemies regarded Nekt as a mythical bear that could not be killed. His war club was called Strike-Only-Once. Eventually, a shot from the first firearm in the territory killed him.

Designated a national historic site in 1971, the Gitwangak hilltop fort (Ta’awdzep) was burned and abandoned about 1835. Formerly known as Kitwanga Fort, the site was occupied from at least the mid-1700s. Palisades surrounded the hilltop stronghold, which enclosed five longhouses. No above ground structures have survived. From here, the Gitwangak people raided settlements along the Skeena River and the coast. Battles were waged to control fishing sites, protect trade routes, and enhance tribal prestige. A defensive measure was a system of logs designed to roll down upon approaching attackers. The location offered a vantage point over the adjacent Kitwankul Trail and the Kitwanga River Valley.

== Gitwangak reserve ==
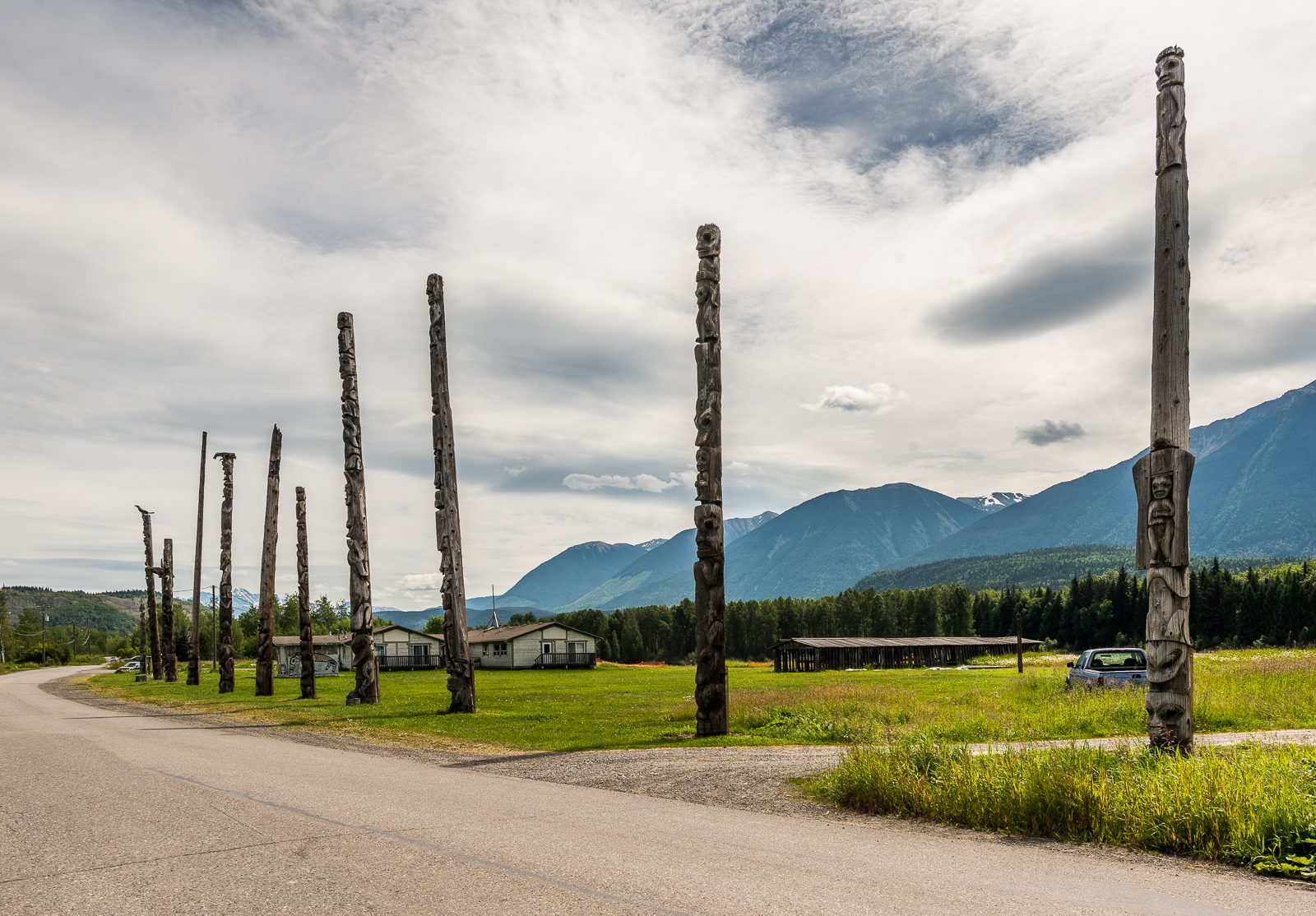
Totem poles, Kitwanga, 2017.

After abandoning the fort, the inhabitants briefly moved to another village before settling at the present site by the river. The totem poles, erected between 1840 and 1942, depict the history of the fort. More than 500 photos document their presence from 1899 to the early 1980s. The 1924–1926 restoration project comprised extensive work on both standing and fallen totems. From 1926 to 1942, poles were moved back from the river edge to the centre of the village. During summer 1969, a further restoration project was undertaken. Both deliberately and accidentally, fire has destroyed many examples.

Significant earlier painters who captured the poles were Emily Carr (1912 and 1926) and George Pepper (1929). A further reproduction appears on a 1930 postage stamp.

Gitwangak is one of six communities that belong to the Gitxsan grouping.

Rev. Alfred Edward Price established the Anglican mission, having charge 1889–1911. The church also administered the day school on the reserve 1898–1975. During winter 1887, a measles epidemic broke out, which quickly spread because people travelled for cultural events.

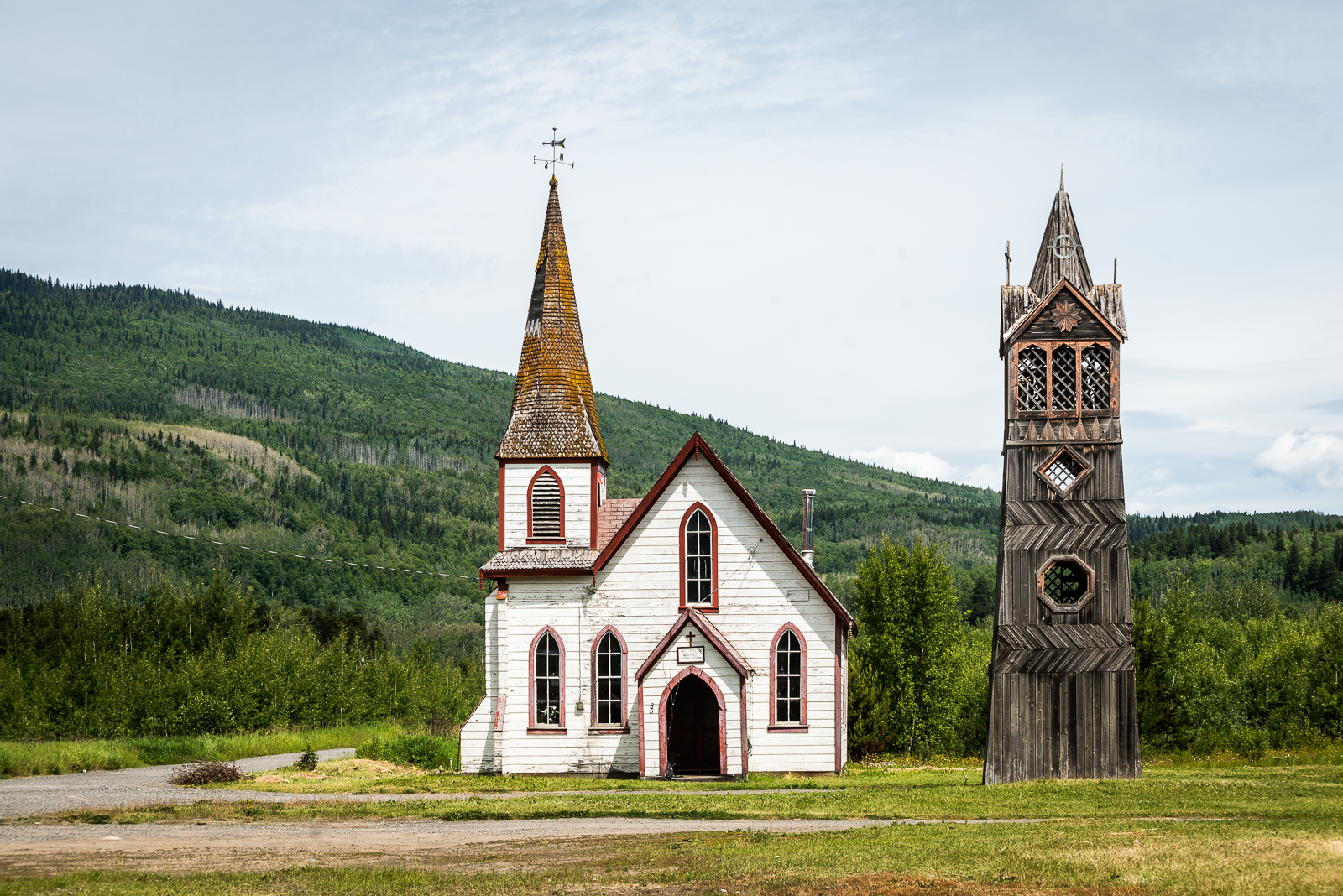
St. Paul's Anglican Church and bell tower, Gitwangak, 2017.

In 1974, the rotted church bell tower was replaced.

In 2009, funding from Northern Development and volunteer labour, enabled extensive renovations to the community hall.

Gitwangak Health and a volunteer fire department serve the community.

In 2021, the second of two suspicious fires destroyed the abandoned St. Paul's Anglican Church, which was built in 1893. The adjacent bell tower was saved despite some fire damage.

Opened in 2023 were a childcare centre providing more than 50 spaces and the two-storey 52-unit Gitwangak Affordable Apartment Complex.

On reserve land at the junction of highways 37 and 16, the Kitwanga Petro-Canada provides fuel, a minor repair shop, a small restaurant, and a convenience store.

== Railway ==
During the Grand Trunk Pacific Railway (GTP) construction, camps were established in 1909 at Andimaul. Here, Foley, Welch and Stewart, the prime contractor, wintered its two steamboats. During 1910, a constable was assigned, a steam shovel arrived, and a general store opened. Two years later, the latter was the final one to exit Andimaul.

At the beginning of March 1912, the eastward advance of the GTP rail head from Prince Rupert passed through Kitwanga and reached Mile 151. The standard-design Plan 100‐152 (Bohi's Type E) station building was erected that year.

During the 1920s, the Canadian National Railway (CN) scheduled a longer stop for passengers to view the totem poles.

In 1928, a locomotive engineer sustained serious injuries to his scalp.

In 1957, a westbound passenger train derailed east of Woodcock. A few months later, a falling boulder killed a section hand 1.6 kilometres (1 mi) east of Andimaul.

In 1963, a derailment occurred near Kitwanga.

In 1978, Kitwanga was one of several communities between Prince Rupert and the Alberta border, where CN eliminated the agent-operator position.

In 1979, an acting conductor slipped under a boxcar during switching, which caused injuries that required one of his legs to be surgically amputated.

In 1981, the CN Express office shuttered.

Closed in 1985, the station property was relocated back from the tracks. Boarded up and covered with graffiti, the building burned down in 2003.

In 2005, runaway rolling stock struck a locomotive on the main line.

In 2012, a freight train struck a tractor trailer unit at the railway crossing.

A 2019 report investigated the concept of constructing a railway line between Kitwanga and Stewart or at least a transloading facility at Kitwanga.

In 2020, 34 covered hopper cars, containing wood pellets, on a westbound freight train derailed. A month later, a train clipped the end of a transport trailer at the railway crossing.

The Andimaul passing track is 2 kilometres (6,530 ft).

A trackside signpost marks the Kitwanga flag stop for Via Rail's Jasper–Prince Rupert train.

Train Timetables (Regular stop or Flag stop)
	Mile	1914	1923	1932	1943	1950	1960	1971	1980	1990	2000	2010	2020
Ritchie	1625.9	Flag	Regular	Flag	Flag	Flag		Flag	Flag				
Cedarvale	1617.5	Flag	Regular	Regular	Regular	Regular	Both	Flag	Flag	Flag	Flag	Flag	Flag
Woodcock	1612.0	Flag	Regular	Regular	Regular	Regular	Flag	Flag	Flag				
Kitwanga	1604.5	Both	Regular	Regular	Regular	Regular	Regular	Regular	Regular	Flag	Flag	Flag	Flag
Andimaul	1599.8	Flag	Regular	Flag	Flag	Flag							
Nash	1595.2	Flag	Regular	Flag	Flag	Flag	Flag						
Skeena Crossing	1593.4		Regular	Flag	Regular	Regular	Flag	Flag	Flag				

^a. From 1989, the next stop eastward was New Hazelton.

== Main roads ==
In 1911, the first 160 kilometres (100 mi) of the Naas wagon road north toward Stewart was completed.

By the early 1930s, the 48-kilometre (30 mi) Kitwanga–Hazelton road was considered fairly good. A road extended east to Prince George. To the west, an isolated 40-kilometre (25 mi) section existed in the vicinity of Terrace.

In 1944, work was completed at the Prince Rupert end and on the Pacific–Kitwanga leg, which opened the Prince Rupert–Prince George highway to military traffic.

In 1956–57, Kitwanga–Hazelton was reconstructed to an all-weather highway.

In 1958, Western Coach Lines inaugurated a Prince Rupert–Prince George bus service, which included a scheduled stop at Kitwanga. The next year, the company withdrew the service.

In 1960, when Prince Coach Lines assumed the Prince Rupert–Prince George route, only 121 kilometres (75 mi) was paved. In 1966, when Canadian Coachways bought the company, only 121 kilometres (75 mi) was still gravel.

In 1963, Woodcock–Kitwanga was completed on the northwest shore, which connected with the existing Cedarvale–Woodcock road. Using the ferries at the respective ends, this provided an alternative scenic route. The Kitwanga ferry was also popular for motorists wishing to view the totem poles.

In 1970, Greyhound Canada purchased Canadian Coachways.

In 1992, when a tanker-trailer crashed though the roadside barrier, 45,000 litres; 12,000 US gallons (10,000 imp gal) of heavy asphalt oil spilled into the Skeena near Andimaul.

Prior to ceasing all intraprovincial services in October 2018, Greyhound had eliminated the Prince Rupert–Prince George run that June. BC Bus North immediately assumed the route.

The current passenger transit providers are BC Bus North and BC Transit.

== Ferry and bridge ==
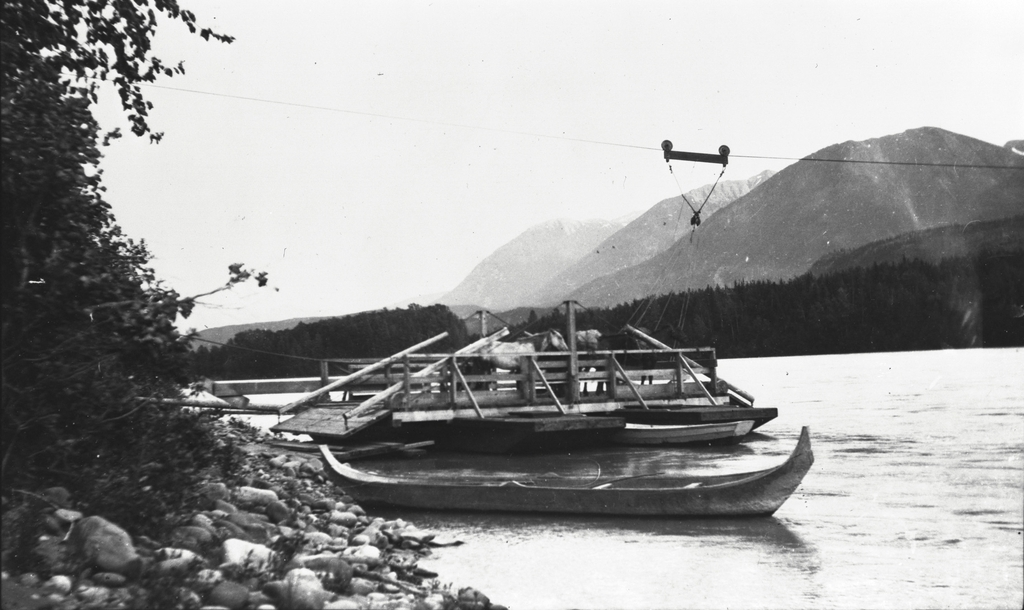
Cable ferry, Kitwanga, 1925.

In 1913, a subsidised seasonal cable ferry was installed over the Skeena.

During summer 1921, the ferry did not operate, because of sparse traffic.

In 1923–24, a new 4.5-tonne; 4.5-long-ton (5-short-ton) reaction ferry was installed.

In 1925–26, new towers and floating landings were built.

In the 1936 flood, the north tower of the ferry crossing moved and the landings were damaged. The ferry operator's residence floated down the river past Cedarvale.

During the 1942 spring runoff, the cable of the new tower under construction had to be cut in order to save the structure.

In 1943, a RCAF pilot died when his plane struck the ferry cable.

In 1947–48, a new 9.1-tonne; 8.9-long-ton (10-short-ton) ferry with steel pontoons was installed.

When a strong gale in 1959 pushed the ferry upstream, the operator and passengers took six hours to pole across the river.

An ice bridge was used during wintertime and a rowboat during the change of season.

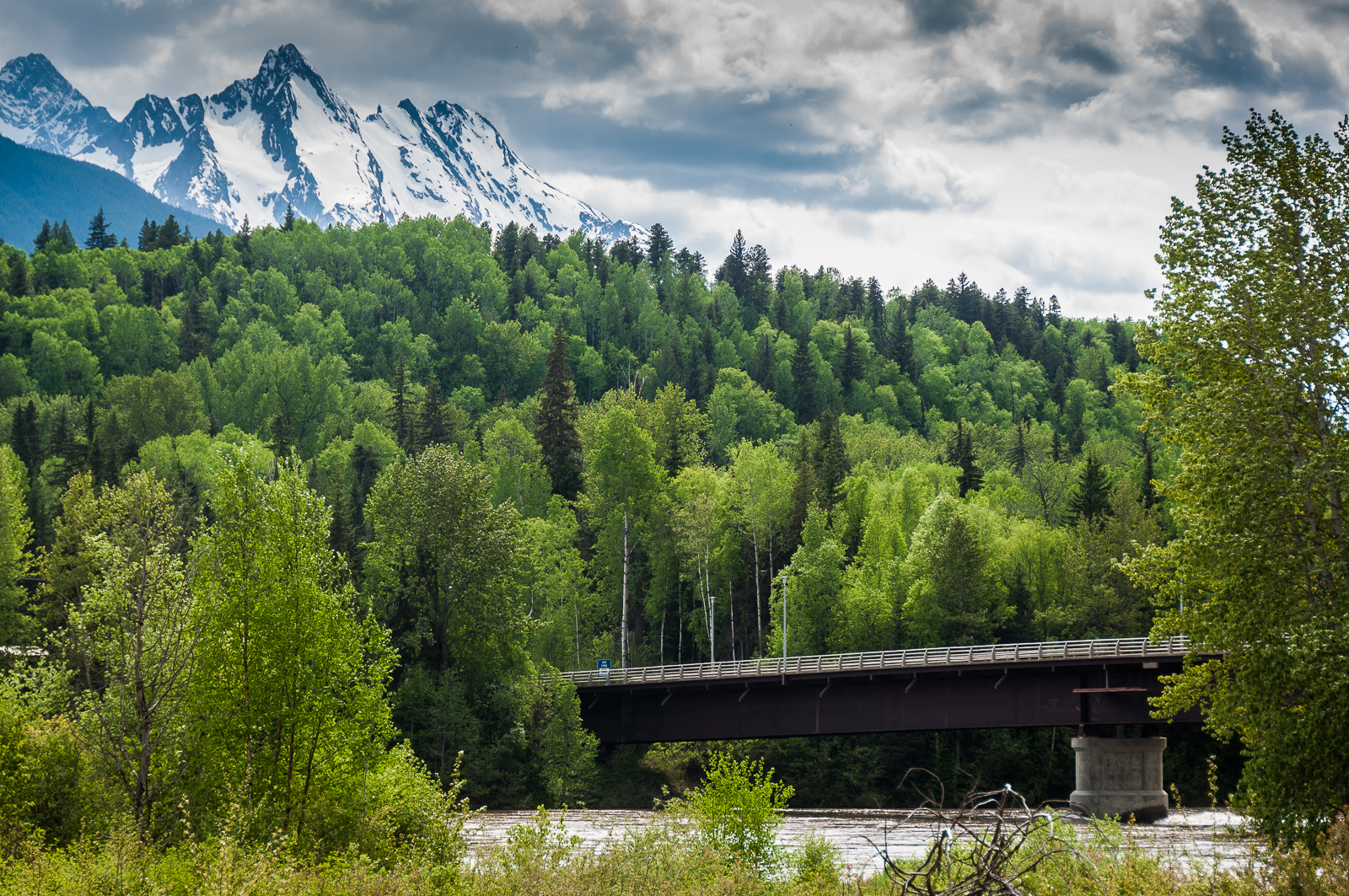
Highway bridge, Kitwanga, 2015.

In 1964, floodwaters collapsed both towers and severely damaged the ferry, cancelling service for several years.

Contracts awarded in 1973 for the new bridge were the substructure to Dillingham ($962,387) and steelwork to Canron ($1,072,000). In 1975, the deck was awarded to Ansha Contracting ($429,370). Officially opened that November, the two-lane bridge included ice-pressure measurement equipment on one of the piers. The ferry was discontinued.

== Local confrontation ==
In the early 1920s, First Nations in the Kitwanga Valley ejected government census takers, threatened European settlers, and blocked visitors from passing through the area.

In 1960, when the province expropriated land for highway widening, the Kitwanga band demanded compensation and the prosecution of the highways minister.

In 1985, CN obtained a BC Supreme Court injunction to stop the band from obstructing the main line. However, access to the industrial park beside the track, which housed maintenance facilities, remained blocked. A sawmill operated within the industrial park. The long disputed land included the railyards, the railway right-of-way, and a 12-hectare (30-acre) industrial park, which the band claimed was improperly transferred to the GTP at the time of railway construction in 1910. In return for lifting the blockade, CN returned an 11-hectare (27-acre) site to the band.

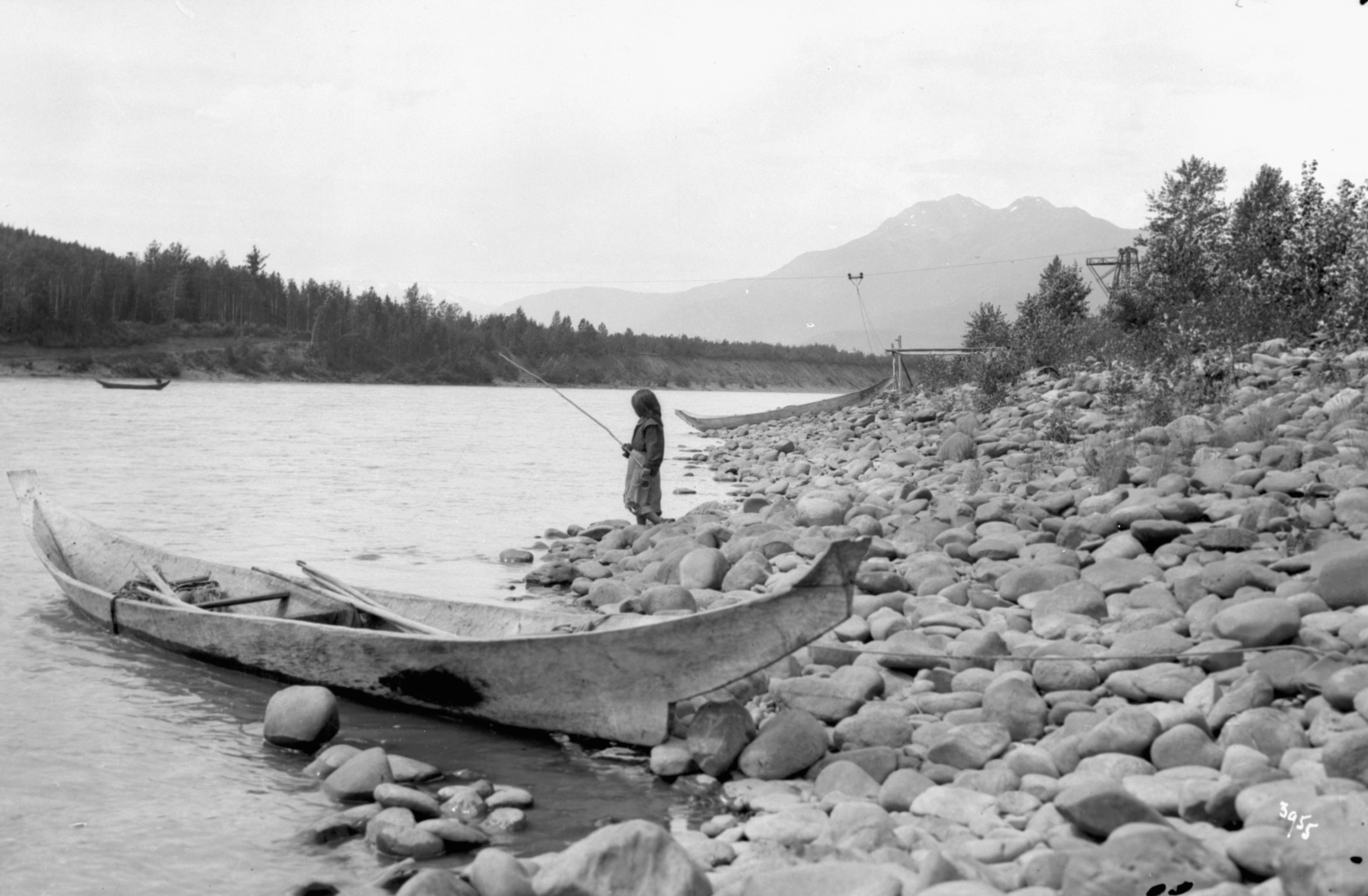
Indigenous girl fishing, Kitwanga, 1915.

In 1986, a gathering of hereditary chiefs at Kitwanga affirmed their intention to defy federal and provincial fishery laws regarding the protection of endangered fish stocks. Days later, Gitwangak members prevented three federal fisheries officers from entering reserve land to investigate illegal fishing.

In 1990, the band blockaded a sawmill road following concerns over reduced lumber demand, which had resulted in 35 mill layoffs over a five-month period. Periodic highway blockades caused a dramatic drop in tourist traffic on Highway 37 and threatened the mining and forestry industries.

In 1992, the band defied a court order to end a two-week blockade of a logging road. Later that year, when three band members were charged with defying a court injunction, a five-day blockade of the CN rail line ended.

Released in 1994, the 90-minute documentary "Blockade" was filmed over a 15-month period. The subject matter was the ongoing conflict between two histories. Further examples were the Gitwangak blocking the logging crews of a family who had been settlers since the 1930s and a mob forcing seniors from their freehold property.

In 2002, an Edmonton resident was fined $12,000 for illegally importing tainted salmon from Kitwanga, which had been caught using an aboriginal communal licence. Two months later, the Gitxsan of Kitwanga proceeded to sell fish illegally.

In 2013, the CN line was blockaded for a day at Kitwanga.

In 2017, the elected band chief obtained a court order to remove a group of hereditary chiefs and other protesters from the band office.

== Forestry ==
A Kitwanga Lumber Co sawmill existed from the mid to late 1920s. In the 1930s Roy Doll started a sawmill on his property. In partnership with his brother Leon they created Kitwanga Sawmill and were the main employer through the 1940s and 1950s. In 1960 they sold their interests to Vernon, Lorne, and Alvin Hobenshield who operated as ALV. In 1963, locally owned Kitwanga Lumber Co established a sawmill.

In 1970, Columbia Cellulose acquired the other Kitwanga mill. In 1973, the province acquired Columbia Cellulose and created a new company called Canadian Cellulose.

In 1981, the company announced that shift cut backs were not likely at the Kitwanga mill. That year, Canadian Cellulose was renamed BC Timber. In 1982, the mill only operated in June. Employees rejected a proposal to reopen for 10 weeks to yearend. The installation of new machinery, a government training grant, and the prospect of new markets, facilitated reopening a month later. However, the future remained uncertain.

In 1984, BC Timber was renamed Westar Timber. The Kitwanga sawmill, which specialized in export products, was able to sell lumber at premium prices. In 1986, Skeena Cellulose, a subsidiary of Repap Industries, bought the Westar assets.

Unable to sell their Kitwanga mill, Repap implemented another period of closure in 1993. Repap purchased a stake in the mill and licences of Kitwanga Lumber Co in 1995 and took full control in 1999. Skeena Cellulose was renamed Repap BC in 1996. The next year, the name reverted to Skeena Cellulose and the insolvent group ceased operations in June but restarted in October after restructuring. In 2002, NWBC Timber and Pulp bought the group.

During that intermediary period, Skeena received $400 million in various forms of loans from the province, while Kitwanga and the associated BC mills operated intermittently. In 2002, NWBC demanded wage cuts prior to reopening. The next year, Skeena Cellulose was renamed New Skeena Forest Products.

In 2004, the company sold the two Kitwanga mills. The next year, the Kitwanga Lumber mill sold again.

The Kitwanga Lumber mill closed in fall 2008 and was purchased by Pacific Bioenergy in 2009. Reopened in June 2011 to provide the raw waste material for a wood pellet plant, production ceased in October, and the company filed for bankruptcy protection in December.

The mill restarted and has operated as Kitwanga Forest Products.

== General community ==
By 1910, settlers had found the valley ideal for potato crops.

Rev. A. E. Price was the inaugural postmaster 1910–1911.

In 1912, North Coast Land established an experimental orchard nearby. Apple trees were planted initially.

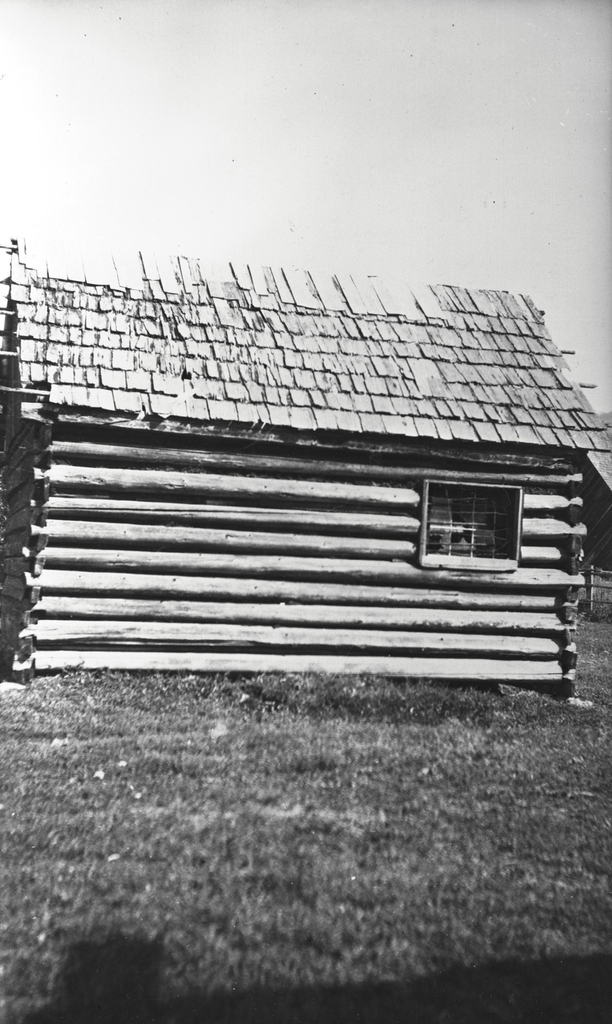
Jail, Kitwanga, 1925.

In 1915, the first general store opened. Three additional general stores, plus a grocer, followed, signalling a peak in retail outlets, which ended with the establishment of the Hudson's Bay Company (HBC) store in 1925.

The public cemetery, which appears to have existed by this time, was enlarged in 1939.

In 1927, an RCMP constable took up residence. In 1929, the RCMP detachment closed.

During the 1950s to 1980s, Doll's service station was the only one in the area. This Esso outlet operated into the early 1990s.

A new, larger post office building opened in 1966.

The three local stores struggled to maintain sufficient funds to cash payroll cheques issued by the two sawmills during the early 1970s. Consequently, the RBC Hazelton branch introduced a sub-branch at Kitwanga, which opened one day per week in the corner of a general store.

St. Saviour's Anglican church was active until the mid-1970s.

In 1978, the band purchased the vacant HBC store for $1. Near the railway track, the building was eventually demolished.

In 1993, fires destroyed a machine shop and the post office. In 1994, a weekend reunion of past residents was held. In 1996, Kitwanga received house numbering.

Around 2014, an ambulance station was set up in the former Forest Services building. Fundraising has continued with respect to a new building, which will have one bay for an ambulance and another for a firetruck, along with crew quarters and office space.

In 2023, The 37 Grille burned to the ground.

Local infrastructure includes a general store, post office, and two campgrounds.

== Public school ==
In 1921–22, the public school opened.

In 1949–50, the school was enlarged and modernized.

To handle the influx from the closure of the reserve day school, the provincial public school was rebuilt. Comprising four classrooms, an activity room, change rooms, library, and office, the complex opened in November 1975. A further $1,350,000 extension to the school in 1979 introduced grades 8–10.

In 1989, the school celebrated the 10th anniversary of including junior secondary grades.

In 2004, the school reverted to elementary grades only.

Part of School District 82 Coast Mountains, Kitwanga Elementary has about 70 enrolled students of which most, if not all, are indigenous.

== Notable people ==
- Jason Haldane, (1971– ), volleyball player, resident.
- Judith P. Morgan, painter (1930–2016 ), place of birth and resident.

== Maps ==
- "Standard Oil BC map". www.davidrumsey.com. 1937.
- "Shell BC map". www.davidrumsey.com. 1956.

== See also ==
- List of Inland Ferries in British Columbia
