= Anderson Flats Provincial Park =

Provincial Park in British Columbia, Canada

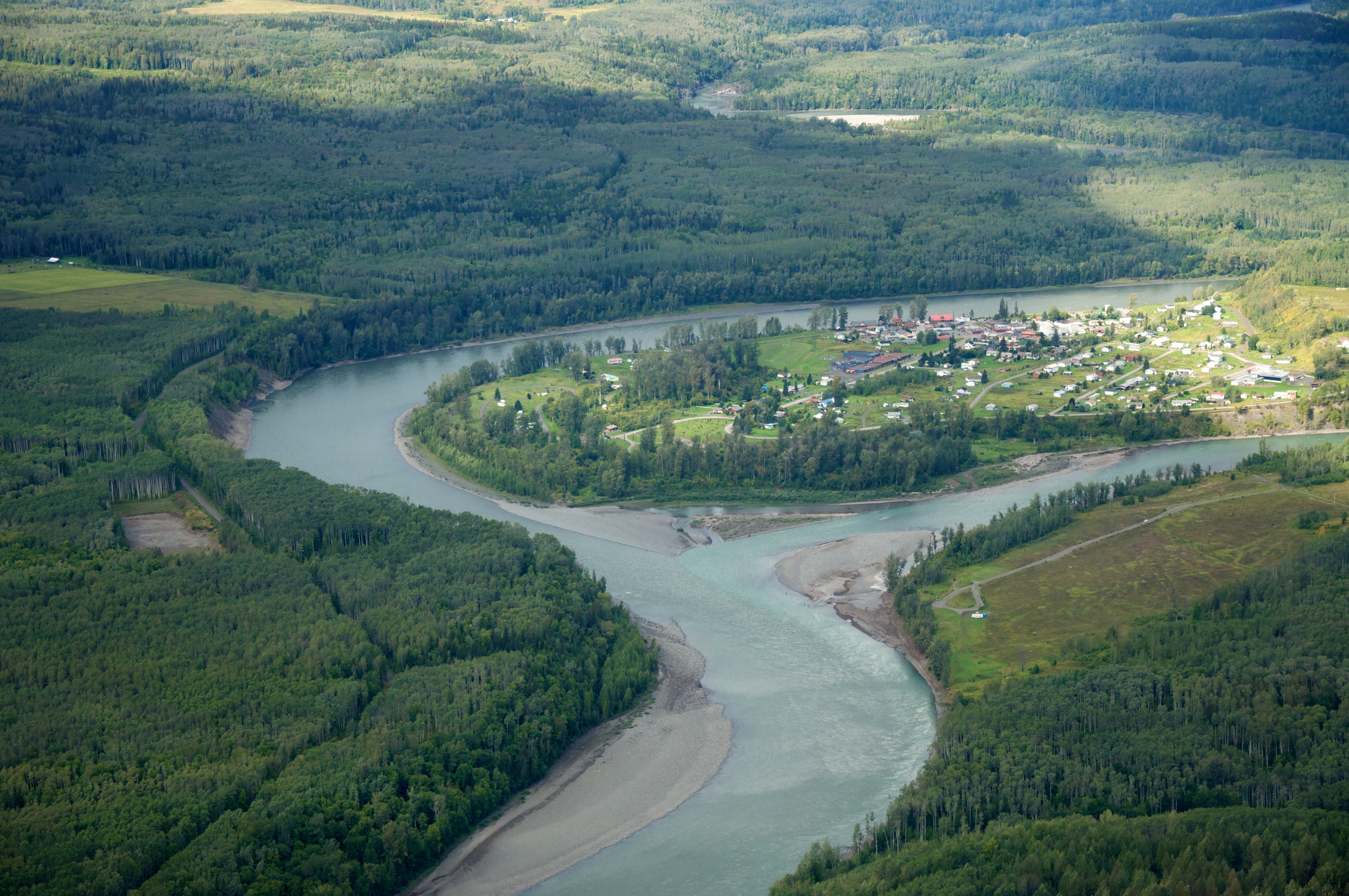
- Northwestward aerial view of Anderson Flats Provincial Park to the right of the confluence

- Location within British Columbia
- Interactive map of Anderson Flats Provincial Park
- Location: Kitmat-Stikine, British Columbia, Canada
- Coordinates: 55°14′39″N 127°39′55″W
- Area: 99 hectares (240 acres)
- Established: 2007
- Governing body: BC Parks
- Website: Official website

Anderson Flats Park is in the Skeena region of west-central British Columbia, Canada. This provincial park is on the southeast shore at the junction of the Skeena River and Buckley River, between South Hazelton and "Old" Hazelton. Off BC Highway 16, the locality is by road about 73 kilometres (45 mi) northwest of Smithers and 132 kilometres (82 mi) northeast of Terrace.

== First Nations and trade ==
During 1866–1868, the Hudson's Bay Company (HBC) operated the Ackwilgate fur trading post at the location, and would take its name from an earlier spelling of Hagwilget to the east. Whenever the HBC built a post, indigenous populations moved toward these trading establishments, which was the case in the Hazelton area. Part of the Gitxsan asserted traditional territory, the property provided various seasonal berries for picking, but no archaeological evidence indicating residence exists.

== Name origin ==
In 1897, Thomas Crosby, a Methodist missionary obtained a Crown Grant for this property. However, the preemption for farming was issued in the prior decade. Rev. Crosby was in charge of Methodist mission work in the north. The earliest newspaper reference to the former name of Mission Point is May 1908. However, the nature of early mission activity here is unknown. Across the Bulkley, the Hazelton hospital site had become the mission base by 1904.

Around 1950, Arthur and Frances Anderson bought the property. The earliest newspaper reference to the later name of Anderson flats is November 1974, when vandals burned down the abandoned house once occupied by Cataline during the 1910s.

== Livestock ==
In 1910, P. Burns & Co leased the Mission Point property from the Methodist Church to build a slaughterhouse and cold storage plant. That August, the company installed the operating machinery. By month end, production had started and offal was being dumped down a chute into the Skeena. Operating a Hazelton butcher shop, the company sold meat to residents and the Grand Trunk Pacific Railway (GTP) construction camps.

In June 1911, the first cattle drive arrived and the next slaughtering season began. When the season ended that November, 1,500 head of cattle had been processed and 500 carcasses were in cold storage to supply winter demand. Three months later, a further 200 steers were driven from the rail head to ensure an adequate meat supply for customers.

Restarting in July 1912, a strong season was again anticipated. With the completion of railway construction activity in the vicinity that year, the plant did not likely reopen in 1913.

In 1914, George M. Beirnes leased the 138-hectare (340-acre) property from the Methodist mission for farming.

== Aviation ==
In June 1920, Capt. Bill Streett and Lieut. Clifford C. Nutt of the USAAC examined potential landing sites for the Alaska Air Expedition from New York to Nome, Alaska. They selected George Beirnes' oat field at Mission Point and arranged for a section of field to be cut to allow the landing of four de Havilland DH-4Bs. In mid-August, the planes landed there, which became known as the Mission Point Aviation Park. The townspeople tramped upon the loose ground to compact it prior to takeoff the next day. In late September, three of the four planes landed on their return, staying until early October, when Capt. Howard T. Douglas travelled by steamship and train to Hazelton. Douglas replaced Sgt. Henriques for the flight back to New York.

In August 1921, Clarence Oliver (Ollie) Prest landed his Curtis JN-4D. He entertained the townsfolk with stunts and offered rides for cash, but when the engine stalled on one takeoff, the plane received minor damage on landing in a small field. After repairs, concerns over local fuel quality prompted the shipping of the plane by rail to Prince Rupert.

In the Air Board's 1922 published list of approved aerodromes, this was the only BC landing field included. The strip was180 by 550 metres (600 by 1,800 ft) and seaplanes could land on the adjacent river. The Railway Employees Investment and Industrial Association of Hazelton purchased a Junkers JL-6, to which floats were installed. The plane was used for prospecting and hunting expeditions. In summer 1923, the Air Board deemed the plane unairworthy. Repairs proved unsuccessful. Reaching 91 metres (300 ft) on a test flight, the engine quit, and the floats skidded along a barn roof on landing. Laying abandoned on the river bank until 1929, the plane was then sold and shipped by rail to Prince George. Mission Point continued to be an important stop for fuel, weather-related issues, and accommodation, for flights to the Yukon and Alaska, since no airfield then existed at Terrace or Prince Rupert. Until the Yukon Telegraph was abandoned in 1936, pilots often requested the telegraph linesmen stationed along the route to light fires to indicate the flight path.

In May 1932, five Eastman E-2 Sea Rovers of the Mitchell Exploration Co. mining expedition, which had been following the GTP line eastward from Ontario, landed on the river. By this time, improvements were needed for the airstrip to safely handle loaded planes. By 1936, the rolling surface prompted an official notice that the use of the unlicensed field was discouraged. That year, Jack Ahearn made a forced landing. After refueling, the engine stalled a few minutes after takeoff. On landing, the plane struck a barn roof, slid, and was badly damaged.

By 1940, during World War II, construction was planned for new airports at Smithers and Prince George. Another field was developed at Woodcock. Hazelton was bypassed as a stop but was used by local aviators.

Mission Point reverted to a rough field, which remained available until the mid-1960s, where the final mention was in a pilots' guide. Subsequently, the site became overgrown with weeds.

== Park profile ==
In March 2006, the Ministry of Environment purchased the property from a private owner. Established in May 2007, the 99-hectare (240-acre) park includes 1,300 metres (4,265 ft) of river frontage on the two rivers, 17 hectares (42 acres) of floodplain, and forested terraces. Directly across the Skeena is Bulkley Junction Provincial Park.

The wildlife habitat includes black bears, grizzly bears, moose, coyotes, wolves, marten, otter, beaver, and bald eagles. Deeper pools adjacent to the park provide rearing and over-wintering fish habitat for various species. Forested provincial crown land borders the eastern boundary. A couple of private residences border the park.

== Park and adjacent facilities ==
The South Hazelton cross-river ferry and subsequent bridge once existed at the end of present Hazelton Station Rd. At this site in 1989, a boat launch was installed. Power boats, recreational and commercial rafters, canoeists and kayakers continue to use this boat ramp. Roads within the park provide public access to both rivers, which offer excellent recreational fishing opportunities. Camping is available June through September. Local residents and occasional visitors accessed the property for fishing and seasonal camping long before the park creation. The open, grassy areas and gravel beach are suitable for picnics and day-use activities. Wheelchair accessible pit toilets exist, but potable water is not available. In winter, cross-country skiing and snowshoeing take place.
