= Cedarvale, British Columbia =

Cedarvale
- Location of Cedarvale in British Columbia
- Coordinates: 55°01′09″N 128°19′50″W
- Country: Canada
- Province: British Columbia
- Region: Skeena
- Regional district: Kitimat–Stikine
- Time zone: UTC−07:00 (PT)
- Area codes: 250, 778, 236, & 672
- Highways: Highway 16 (TCH)
- Waterways: Skeena River

Cedarvale is an unincorporated community in the Skeena region of west central British Columbia. Concentrated on the southeastern shore of the Skeena River, no direct link exists to the portion on the northwestern shore. On BC Highway 16, the locality is by road about 130 kilometres (81 mi) northwest of Smithers and 75 kilometres (47 mi) northeast of Terrace.

== Name origin ==
Prior to the arrival of Europeans, the settlement on the northwest shore was called Gitlusec. The later mission settlement was named Meanskinisht (with variations such as Minskinish), which means "under the pitch pines". The subsequent general community was called Cedarvale, which alluded to the cedars growing around the former landing.

== Mission and First Nations ==
In 1888, Rev. Robert Tomlinson and his First Nations followers founded the hamlet on opposite banks of the river.

Supplied by flumes from the creek, a water-powered sawmill was installed on the northwest shore. Being the only mill in the district, timber was produced both for local demand and for as far away as Hazelton.

During the first few years, the group depended upon canoe transport to obtain supplies from the coast. In 1891, the Hudson's Bay Company (HBC) S.S. Caledonia began a service from the coast to Hazelton. Prior to the arrival of the railway, such steamboats called at the landing, where cordwood was stacked for their boilers.

The strict Sabbath observance at the mission meant that even minor activities, which could be considered as work, were not permitted on Sundays. Such strict rules for members prompted outsiders to facetiously call the place "Holy City" or "Little Heaven".

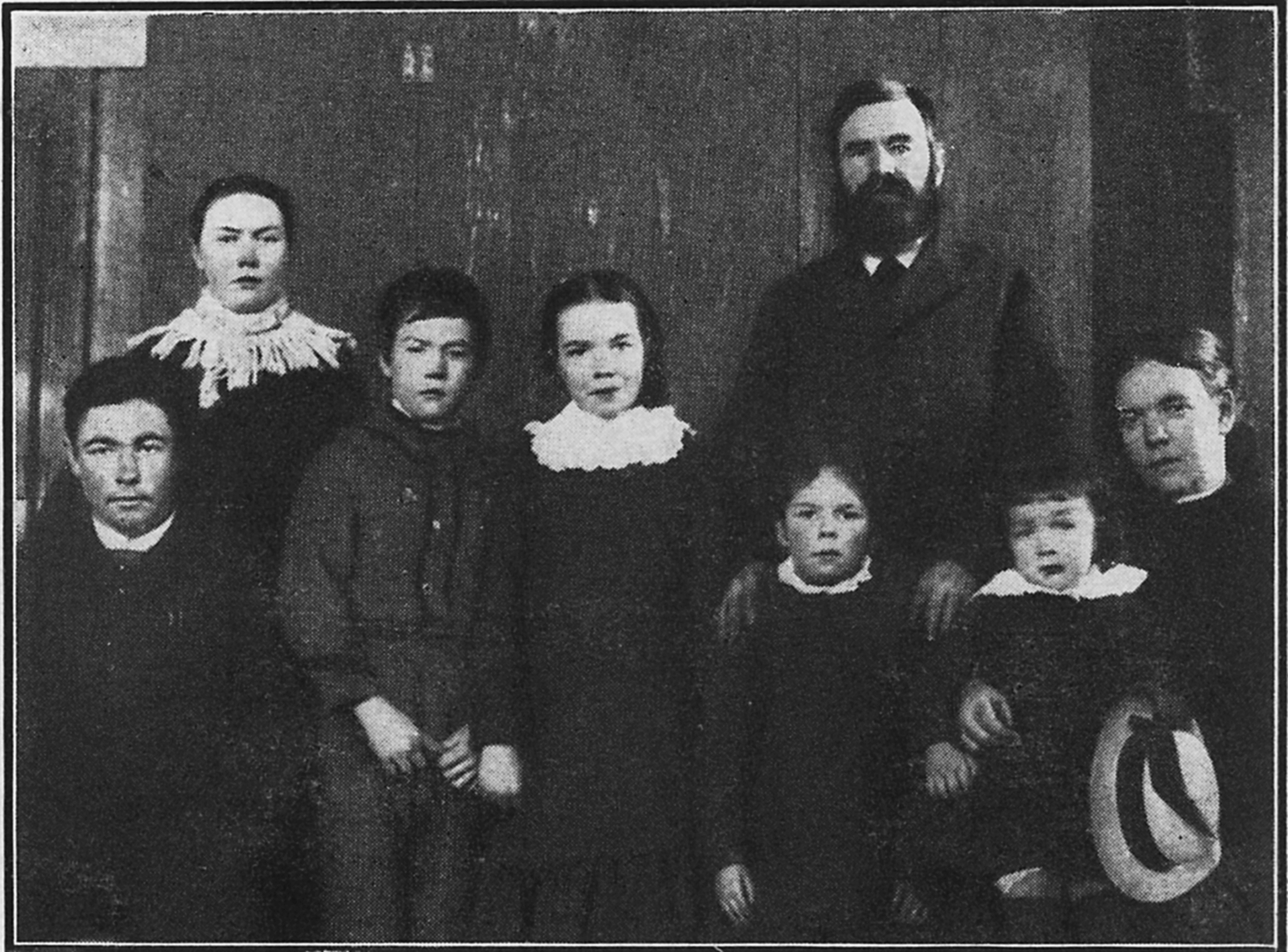
Rev. R. Tomlinson and family, c.1890.

Obligatory were church attendance, school attendance for children, and renouncing First Nations traditions. Work activities included farming, assisting in the general store, handling the government mail contract, and employment in the sawmill. The latter closed in 1913, when the site was expropriated for the railway right-of-way. Tomlinson died that year. He was an Anglican missionary, who emphasized the importance of discipline. An example was placing the jail, which was much used for even non-criminal transgressions, next to the church.

Just beyond the northern boundary of the reserve lies the cemetery and former site of the two mission churches. Erected in 1891, the first was a pioneer-style log structure. In 1907, the replacement was a wooden Gothic-style building with stained glass windows.

In 1906, the schoolhouse burned down. From 1907, Indian Affairs funded the teacher's salary. From 1914, the Missionary Society of the Methodist Church took charge of the mission and the day school. In 1924, the school closed.

In 1951, fire destroyed the church.

In 2013, the cemetery was designated a national historic site.

East of Cedarvale proper on the east shore, Koonwats 7 is a Gitwangak reserve.

== Railway ==
During the Grand Trunk Pacific Railway (GTP) construction, a camp was established just south of the Meanskinisht sawmill.

In late February 1912, the eastward advance of the GTP rail head from Prince Rupert passed through Cedarvale and reached Mile 143. The next month, the court awarded Rev. R. Tomlinson $4,500 for the GTP right-of-way expropriation of the Meanskinisht mission land on the northwest shore. The amount was close to the original offer, but legal costs consumed the greater part, leaving the owner thousands of dollars worse off.

The standard-design Plan 100-152 (Bohi's Type E) station building was erected that year, but the station was initially called Hollwood. The HBC intended to operate a steamer from this point upstream during railway construction. By mid-1913, the station had been renamed as Cedarvale.

In 1924, a section foreman died from injuries sustained when his speeder ran into a rockslide about 9 kilometres (6 mi) west.

In 1925, another section foreman died when his speeder crashed into an approaching train at Ritchie.

In 1936, a foot caught between two drawbars at Cedarvale was badly crushed.

During World War II, the Canadian National Railway (CN) installed telegraph repeater stations at Prince George, Burns Lake, Woodcock and Prince Rupert.

Around 1956, when CN built repeater stations at Terrace and Smithers to improve CN telegraph services, the Woodcock facility closed.

In 1957, the locomotive and two cars of a westbound passenger train derailed near Woodcock.

The Cedarvale station premises were vacated in the mid-1980s and the salvageable buildings offered for sale in 1987.

During the lengthening of the Cedarvale passing track in 2012, Gitlusec artifacts were discovered. The passing track is 2.1 kilometres (6,855 ft).

A trackside signpost marks the Cedarvale flag stop for Via Rail's Jasper – Prince Rupert train.

Train Timetables (Regular stop or Flag stop)
	Mile	1914	1923	1932	1943	1950	1960	1971	1980	1990	2000	2010	2020
Pacific	1638.5	Reg.	Reg.	Reg.	Reg.	Reg.	Flag	Flag	Flag	Flag	Flag	Flag	Flag
Dorreen	1632.4	Flag	Reg.	Flag	Flag	Flag	Flag	Flag	Flag	Flag	Flag	Flag	Flag
Ritchie	1625.9	Flag	Reg.	Flag	Flag	Flag		Flag	Flag				
Cedarvale	1617.5	Flag	Reg.	Reg.	Reg.	Reg.	Both	Flag	Flag	Flag	Flag	Flag	Flag
Woodcock	1612.0	Flag	Reg.	Reg.	Reg.	Reg.	Flag	Flag	Flag				
Kitwanga	1604.5	Both	Reg.	Reg.	Reg.	Reg.	Reg.	Reg.	Reg.	Flag	Flag	Flag	Flag
Andimaul	1599.8	Flag	Reg.	Flag	Flag	Flag							

== Ferry ==
Since the mission community straddled both sides of the Skeena, the mission canoes provided an informal ferry service from the 1890s.

Although funded for the 1913–14 year and anticipated in 1916, the commencement of the subsidised seasonal ferry seems to have been in 1917.

In 1929–30, a new 4.5-tonne; 4.5-long-ton (5-short-ton) reaction ferry was installed.

In the 1936 flood, the ferry sustained light damage, the ferry house lifted and floated amongst the trees, and the approach bridge across the Skeena River channel washed out.

The new 9.1-tonne; 8.9-long-ton (10-short-ton) reaction ferry constructed for Cedarvale in 1946–47 appears to have been installed instead at Kitwanga the next year.

In 1948, the 21-metre (68 ft) King truss bridge across the channel on the road to the Cedarvale ferry washed out.

In 1960–61, both cable towers were reconstructed.

Installed in 1963–64 were new landing pontoons and a basket-type aerial passenger ferry using the existing cable during winter.

In 1965–66, separate towers were erected for the aerial basket ferry. A new residence and equipment shed were built.

The ferry remained at two-car capacity until 1973, when a larger four-car ferry was installed.

In 1975, the main cable snapped, which left the loaded ferry stranded 61 metres (200 ft) from shore. Apparently, the excessive weight of a dump truck, loader and two cars brought down the two towers, breaking the cable. A helicopter rescued the five people aboard. The ferry stayed out of service the rest of the season.

The aerial ferry remained in use, but it is unclear if the reaction ferry was restored. In 1978, all ferry service was discontinued.

== Main road ==
During 1931–1941, a series of 2-to-6-kilometre (1 to 4 mi) stretches were built on the Usk–Cedarvale road.

Completion of the Pacific–Cedarvale section opened the Prince Rupert–Prince George highway in 1944, primarily to military traffic.

In 1958, when a Prince Rupert–Prince George bus service was inaugurated, Cedarvale was a scheduled stop. This stop existed at least until the mid-1960s. In later years, Kitwanga has been the nearest stop.

In 1966, the 64-kilometre (40 mi) Terrace–Cedarvale section of highway still remained unpaved.

In 1970, Usk–Cedarvale widening and paving were completed.

== General community ==
A.S. Gray was the foreman for wagon road construction. In 1907, he obtained his pre-emption, where he planted fruit trees, harvested wheat, and sold vegetables from his garden to the railway construction camp. Within a few years, he was known as the "potato king".

Opened in 1910, the post office was called Cedarvale, which provided the new name for the locality. Mrs. J.W. Graham was the inaugural postmaster 1910–1918. Her husband operated a significant poultry farm.

In 1918–19, the school opened on the northwest shore, followed by the general store about a year later.

During the early 1920s, a downturn in lumber activity closed the school for three years. In 1926–27, a new school building was erected. At this time, mining, trapping, and logging sustained this poor and scattered community.

During World War II, Japan launched the Fu-Go balloon bombs. One balloon became suspended between three big trees near Cedarvale. The explosives beneath the huge canopy were successfully defused.

On the southeast shore, a small general store, café, and gas bar existed, adjacent to the northern tip of the island.

The one-room school was augmented in 1954–55, when the vacant Skeena Crossing building was moved to Cedarvale.

Cedarvale Elementary appears to have closed in 1975.

The store/post office on the northwest shore closed in the mid-1990s and only a collapsed building remains.

== Maps ==
- "Standard Oil BC map". www.davidrumsey.com. 1937.
- "Shell BC map". www.davidrumsey.com. 1956. Archived from the original on 2022-10-17.

== See also ==
- List of Inland Ferries in British Columbia

== Ritchie ==
West of Cedarvale, Ritchie was named by the GTP in the early 1910s. The specific person honored is subject to speculation. One suggestion was George Hamilton Ritchie, a sternwheeler captain on the Skeena. Another is Joseph Frederick Nelson Ritchie, a government land surveyor. Equally as plausible is John Henderson Ritchie, a GTP construction engineer involved in the project, who died in 1911.

During the 1910s and 1920s, the nearest post office was by rail about 5 kilometres (3 mi) south at Lorne Creek.

In the early 1990s, the Skeena Watershed Management Authority established a fish landing site at Ritchie for DFO monitoring.

== Woodcock ==
East of Cedarvale, the former community was an impoverished mountainous farming and mining settlement. Named after William Henry Woodcock, the community now comprises a small scattered population.

In 1920, the Cassiar Farm and Stock Co purchased 142 hectares (350 acres), began land clearing, planted crops, and initiated a dairy farm. In 1923, Robert McKay purchased a two-thirds interest in the venture called the Cassiar Northern Ranch, where 100 dairy cows would supply the Prince Rupert market. Renamed Woodcock Dairies, the bank foreclosed on the farm in 1925 and auctioned off the assets.

The school opened in 1923 and closed in 1945.

Woodcock Airport is an abandoned RCAF runway.

== Climate ==
Cedarvale has a humid continental climate (Köppen climate classification Dfb) with cold, snowy winters and warm summers.

Climate data for Cedarvale, British Columbia
Month	Jan	Feb	Mar	Apr	May	Jun	Jul	Aug	Sep	Oct	Nov	Dec	Year
Record high °C (°F)	11.0 (51.8)	12.0 (53.6)	18.0 (64.4)	26.5 (79.7)	35.0 (95.0)	35.5 (95.9)	35.0 (95.0)	37.0 (98.6)	31.1 (88.0)	21.0 (69.8)	13.9 (57.0)	11.5 (52.7)	37.0 (98.6)
Mean daily maximum °C (°F)	−2.0 (28.4)	0.9 (33.6)	7.2 (45.0)	12.9 (55.2)	17.3 (63.1)	20.7 (69.3)	23.3 (73.9)	22.9 (73.2)	17.2 (63.0)	10.1 (50.2)	2.2 (36.0)	−1.8 (28.8)	10.9 (51.6)
Daily mean °C (°F)	−4.9 (23.2)	−2.8 (27.0)	2.3 (36.1)	6.8 (44.2)	10.9 (51.6)	14.4 (57.9)	16.9 (62.4)	16.6 (61.9)	12.1 (53.8)	6.5 (43.7)	−0.4 (31.3)	−4.6 (23.7)	6.2 (43.2)
Mean daily minimum °C (°F)	−7.8 (18.0)	−6.4 (20.5)	−2.7 (27.1)	0.6 (33.1)	4.6 (40.3)	8.1 (46.6)	10.4 (50.7)	10.2 (50.4)	7.0 (44.6)	2.9 (37.2)	−3.0 (26.6)	−7.3 (18.9)	1.4 (34.5)
Record low °C (°F)	−33.5 (−28.3)	−30.0 (−22.0)	−22.8 (−9.0)	−10.0 (14.0)	−5.0 (23.0)	−0.5 (31.1)	3.9 (39.0)	2.0 (35.6)	−2.5 (27.5)	−19.0 (−2.2)	−30.0 (−22.0)	−33.0 (−27.4)	−33.5 (−28.3)
Average precipitation mm (inches)	112.8 (4.44)	60.0 (2.36)	39.6 (1.56)	32.1 (1.26)	39.3 (1.55)	48.1 (1.89)	38.9 (1.53)	46.6 (1.83)	80.7 (3.18)	126.6 (4.98)	92.0 (3.62)	108.6 (4.28)	825.2 (32.49)
Average rainfall mm (inches)	34.3 (1.35)	25.0 (0.98)	23.8 (0.94)	29.7 (1.17)	39.3 (1.55)	48.1 (1.89)	38.9 (1.53)	46.6 (1.83)	80.7 (3.18)	123.7 (4.87)	50.5 (1.99)	36.4 (1.43)	577.0 (22.72)
Average snowfall cm (inches)	78.4 (30.9)	35.0 (13.8)	15.8 (6.2)	2.4 (0.9)	0 (0)	0 (0)	0 (0)	0 (0)	0 (0)	2.9 (1.1)	41.5 (16.3)	72.2 (28.4)	248.2 (97.7)
Average precipitation days (≥ 0.2 mm)	17.5	13.7	12.4	12.6	13.4	13.1	12.8	12.5	17.0	19.5	18.2	18.7	181.3
Average rainy days (≥ 0.2 mm)	6.5	6.8	8.6	11.9	13.4	13.1	12.8	12.5	17.0	19.1	11.2	7.6	140.5
Average snowy days (≥ 0.2 cm)	13.2	8.8	5.2	1.2	0.05	0	0	0	0	1.2	10.2	13.8	53.7
Source: Environment Canada
