= Coast Mountain College =

Post-secondary educational institution in British Columbia

- Other name: CMTN
- Former names: Northwest Community College (1975-2018); BC Vocational School Terrace (1968-1975)
- Type: College
- Established: 1968
- Academic affiliations: UArctic, CICan, BCC
- Endowment: $24,476,000
- Chair: CJ Butcher
- President: Laurie Waye
- Vice-president: Michael Doyle, Titi Kunkel
- Dean: Colin Elliott (University Credit, Business, Access Education & IT Programs), Kellie Swain (Trades, First Nations Fine Arts & Workforce Training)
- Students: 460 (2024-25 FTE)
- Location: 5331 McConnell Ave, Terrace, British Columbia, Canada
- Campus: Terrace, Prince Rupert, Smithers
- Colours: Teal & white
- Website: coastmountaincollege.ca

Coast Mountain College (CMTN) is an accredited, publicly funded post-secondary educational institution that serves the communities of British Columbia's northwest region. CMTN offers field schools, college access, trades, university credit, health and human services programs. The college is a member of the University of the Arctic network, and Colleges and Institutes Canada (CiCan).

== History ==
The British Columbia Vocational School, Terrace began construction in 1965. The school opened in September 1968, with 1968-69 enrolment reaching 295 students. An official opening was held August 11, 1970. Northwest College was established on the site in 1975. The name was soon changed to Northwest Community College (NWCC) and was renamed Coast Mountain College on June 18, 2018.

In 1976 poet George Stanley and author Stan Persky moved to Terrace. Perskey worked as a Sociology professor before moving to Capilano College in 1983. Stanley worked at the college as an instructor in the English department until 1991. Marie Lucie Tarpent was a part time instructor at the college in 1983 studying Tshimshianic and Nisga'a languages.

The college received a $745,000 budget increase in 2000. It was led by president Stephanie Forsyth during the 2000s. After 10 years, in 2010 Forsyth left for the same role with Red River College.

The college had a full-time equivalent student enrolment of 1,271 students in 2011/12. Significant layoffs occurred in 2012 following deficits of over $1.4 million in 2011 and $2.1 million in 2012. The layoffs were grieved. In 2014 an arbitrator ruled the collective agreement had not been followed in the layoff process, by which time enrolment had dropped by nearly 25% to 970.

A new president joined the college in 2014 bringing a re-branding strategy and increased focus on international students. The college's traditional Thunderbird logo was phased out. By 2019 FTE student enrolment had dropped to 699 students. In February 2020 the college appointed new president Justin Kohlman. By August of the following year Kohlman was out as president, by which time the college's enrolment had dropped to 462.

Totem poles and traditional art which reflect the history of the surrounding territories and peoples are displayed on the college campuses and have been commissioned for groups outside the region, including organizations in the United States and China. In 1996 CMTN established the First Nations Council to facilitate direct contact with Indigenous communities.

From 2023-24 college FTE enrolment dropped to 403, less than a quarter of the BC government target of 1,718 students. The closure of the Hazelton campus was announced in 2025, as well as the sale of its Kitimat and Houston campuses, and 20% staff layoffs.

== Campus ==
Coast Mountain College (CMTN) has campuses in three northwest British Columbia communities: Prince Rupert; Smithers; and Terrace. Coast Mountain College (CMTN) serves seven First Nations in Northwest British Columbia: Haida, Tsimshian, Nisga'a, Haisla, Gitxsan, Wet'suwet'en, and Tahltan.

=== Terrace ===
The main campus sits on 30 acres approximately 5 kilometers from downtown Terrace. Names and signage at the college are bilingual Sm'algyax and English. Buildings include, academic building Waap Sa'mn (House of Spruce), trades building Waap Amgam (House of Cedar), cafeteria and services building Waap Haawk (House of Birch), administration building Waap Sginiis (House of Jackpine) and the 230,000 square foot student housing building Wii Gyemsiga Siwilaawksat (Where learners are content and comfortable.)

CMTN unveiled an $18.4 million state-of-the-art renovation to their Waap Amgam (House of Cedar) trades building in September 2018.

In September 2019 Minister of Advanced Education, Skills and Training Melanie Mark, visited the Terrace campus to announce an $18.7 million in provincial funding for the construction of two new 3-storey student residences. On August 31, 2022, a totem pole was raised outside the new Wii Gyemsiga Siwilaawksat building. (Where learners are content and comfortable.)

As of 2021 work continues on major projects at Coast Mountain College campus buildings including the top two floors of the main academic building Waap Sa'mn (House of Spruce), the library and student housing with a combined budget of $35 million.

At the south end of the campus stands Waap Galts’ap, the 6,000 square foot campus Longhouse. The Longhouse, constructed in 2006 is primarily used for student-centered and cultural activities and there are various events hosted there throughout the year.

A satellite campus in the Thornhill suburb of Terrace is located at the Northwest Trades & Employment Training Centre (NTETC).

=== Prince Rupert ===
Constructed in 2004 with a $12 million budget, the two building campus of nearly 50,000 square feet is located in downtown Prince Rupert. The campus is home to the world-renowned Applied Coastal Ecology program. The CMTN Prince Rupert campus doubles as a campus for the University of Northern British Columbia. The Prince Rupert campus includes a large library, multiple seminar rooms, trades facilities, a Learning Resource Centre, student lounge, 19 classrooms, two computer labs, two science labs and the innovation lab.

=== Smithers ===
The current Smithers campus is located on second Avenue and was completed in 2011 at a cost of $17 million. The two-level Gold LEED facility is just under 20,000 square feet and was built with wood, rock and Indigenous art to represent themes of forestry, resource management and Indigenous culture. The Bulkley Valley Learning Centre operates from the Smithers campus.

=== Hazelton ===
The closure of the Hazelton campus was announced in 2025. It was constructed in 1998 at a cost of $1.3 million, with grand opening held January 16, 1999. The 9,000 square foot building is located at 4815 Swannell Drive serving local communities including Old Hazelton, New Hazelton, South Hazelton, Two Mile, Gitanmaax, Kispiox, Glen Vowell, Hagwilget, Gitsegukla, Gitanyow, and Kitwanga.

== Organization and Administration ==
The Coast Mountain College Board of Governors and Educational Council determine appropriate organizational performance. The CMTN Foundation grows and stewards resources to support the college. The First Nations Council provides direct consultation with First Nations in the college region.

== Aboriginal ==
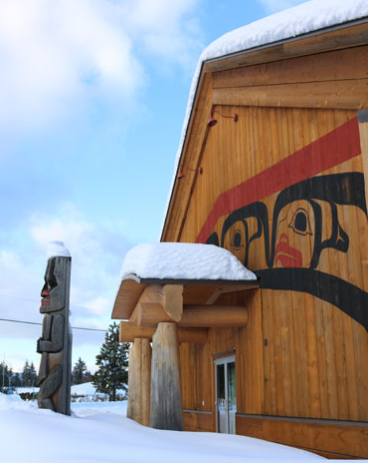
Waap Galts'ap - Longhouse

Coast Mountain College (CMTN) serves the people of northwest British Columbia, in a region that includes the lands of the Haida, Tsimshian, Nisga'a, Haisla, Gitxsan, Wet'suwet'en, and Tahltan peoples. CMTN through its First Nations Council, has entered into a relationship with the Nisga'a Wilp Wilxo'oskwhl Nisga'a (“Nisga'a House of Learning”) to promote and enable resident of the Nass Valley region to obtain post-secondary education.

In 2020, CMTN added support for Indigenous Students to combat COVID-19. Indigenous students accessing college programs or services are supported by a team of First Nations Access Coordinators. In February 2022, CMTN's Freda Diesing School of Northwest Coast Art alumna, artist Kristen McKay, was the winner of a Pink Shirt Day design contest held by the First Nations Access Coordinators (FNAC), that is now being distributed across all campuses in the region.

== Scholarships and bursaries ==
The CMTN Foundation supports students through scholarships and bursaries. The Government of Canada sponsors an Aboriginal Bursaries Search Tool that lists over 680 scholarships, bursaries, and other incentives offered by governments, universities, and industry to support Aboriginal post-secondary participation. Coast Mountain College scholarships for Aboriginal, First Nations and Métis students include: Awards for Aboriginal Women. Coast Mountain College supports students and rewards success through their CMTN Awards, Bursaries & Scholarships program.

== Notable faculty ==
- Stan Persky, Canadian writer, media commentator and instructor
- George Stanley, American-born Canadian poet
- Marie-Lucie Tarpent, French-born Canadian linguist and professor

== See also ==
- List of institutes and colleges in British Columbia
- List of universities in British Columbia
- Higher education in British Columbia
- Education in Canada
