= British Columbia Highway 62 =

British Columbia High level road

Highway 62 (unofficial)
- High Level Road

Route information
- Length: 7.34 km (4.56 mi)

Major junctions
- West end: Hazelton
- East end: Highway 16 (TCH) at New Hazelton

Location
- Country: Canada
- Province: British Columbia

Highway system
- British Columbia provincial highways
← Highway 52	→ Highway 77

Highway 62, also known as High Level Road, is a 7.34 km (4.56 mi) spur located in northern British Columbia, running from the junction of the Yellowhead Highway (Highway 16) in New Hazelton to downtown Hazelton. Highway 62 is an unofficial highway.

After leaving New Hazelton, the highway crosses the Hagwilget First Nations reserve community. Continuing west, Highway 62 passes over the Bulkley River and through the village of Two Mile before ending on River Road in Hazelton.
