= Lorne Creek =

Creek in British Columbia, Canada

Coordinates: 54°52′51″N 128°23′14″W

Location
- Country: Canada
- Province: British Columbia
- Region: Omineca Country

Physical characteristics
- Mouth: Skeena River
  - location: the former mining hamlet of Lorne Creek in the Skeena

Lorne Creek is a creek in the Omineca Country region of west central British Columbia, which enters the Skeena River from the west. Henry McDame discovered gold in this creek in 1884, leading to placer mining.

At the creek mouth, the former mining hamlet of Lorne Creek in the Skeena region, lying between Terrace and Hazelton, was by rail about 5 kilometres (3 mi) north of Dorreen and 19 kilometres (12 mi) south of Cedarvale.

The post office operated intermittently 1913–1927. During this period, the place was an unofficial Grand Trunk Pacific Railway (GTP) flag stop.

In 1940, when an embankment subsided, the locomotive, tender, and a freight car, of an eastbound train plunged about 9 metres (30 ft) into the raging creek, resulting in five deaths.

== See also ==
- List of rivers of British Columbia
