= New Hazelton =

- District municipality
- District of New Hazelton
- Location within British Columbia
- Coordinates: 55°14′35″N 127°35′12″W
- Country: Canada
- Province: British Columbia
- Regional district: Kitimat–Stikine

Government
  - Mayor: Gail Lowry

Area
  - Total: 24.34 km^{2} (9.40 sq mi)

Population (2021)
  - Total: 602
  - Density: 24.7/km^{2} (64.1/sq mi)
- Time zone: UTC−07:00 (PT)
- Postal code: V0J 2J0
- Area codes: 250, 778, 236, & 672
- Highways: Highway 16 (TCH) Trans-Canada Highway
- Website: Official website

New Hazelton is a district municipality on the south side of the Bulkley River in the Skeena region of west central British Columbia, Canada. On BC Highway 16, the locality is by road about 68 kilometres (42 mi) northwest of Smithers and 137 kilometres (85 mi) northeast of Terrace. New Hazelton is one of the "Three Hazeltons", the other two being the original "Old" Hazelton to the northwest and South Hazelton to the west.

== Initial speculation ==
During the Grand Trunk Pacific Railway (GTP) construction land speculation was rife along the proposed route. In July 1911, Lot 883, between the Bulkley River and the northernmost point on the railway right-of-way, was the first property to be marketed as the Larkford townsite. Several Hazelton businesses acquired lots, but it is not clear if they were given or paid for the properties. Lot 882, adjacent to the south, was called Taylorville, because the owner had been either F.C. Taylor or Hugh Taylor. Called either the Taylor section or Taylorville, the site was being developed at the time. That month, the surveyed streets were created at Larkford by clearing tree obstructions and the lots were misrepresented as "Larkford, the New Hazelton". Like similar speculative ventures, no evidence exists that buildings were ever erected at Larkford which has since reverted to natural vegetation.

== Establishing the community ==
In early 1911, Robert Kelly purchased Lot 882 for $100,000, upon which a township would be established. That May, the township of New Hazelton was laid out. The location was close to the Rocher de Boule and Silver Standard mines, both of which were huge potential customers for the railway. The GTP land commissioner, George Ryley, agreed that Lot 882 was a good location and wanted the railway to have a share in the profits from selling lots in the new townsite. Kelly refused, so Ryley found another property, Lot 851, whose owners were willing to share their profits, providing they were promised a station. Ryley made the deal and the village of South Hazelton was born. When Robert Kelly learned of these new plans, he petitioned the Board of Railway Commissioners to force the GTP to build the station in New Hazelton, which was closer to the mines. The BRC decided in Kelly's favour, particularly after they heard evidence from the miners who said the cost of shipping the ore to South Hazelton would be $4 a ton more than to New Hazelton. The railway, however, ignored the directive and built the station in South Hazelton and continued to sell lots in the townsite.

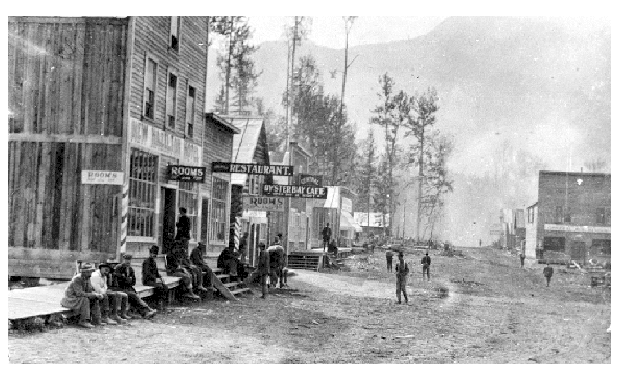
New Hazelton (1914)

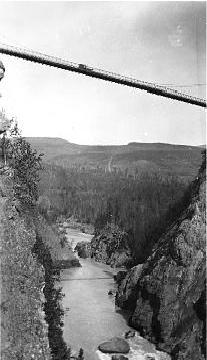
Craddock Bridge

In 1913, to make his townsite more attractive, Robert Kelly decided to have a bridge built across Bulkley River and hired the firm of Craddock and Company to do the work. The bridge was completed that fall, but was very narrow, barely wide enough for a single vehicle. Furthermore, it was 266 feet above the water and had a tendency to sway in the gentlest of breezes. The bridge soon became shunned as even the most courageous and expert drivers felt seasick or damaged their cars while crossing it.

Despite the lack of a station, New Hazelton prospered during rail construction. In 1913, it had 121 buildings and a population of 350 while South Hazelton had one tent and two restaurants. By that summer, the railway relented and built a station at New Hazelton in return for a share of three-sevenths of the profits. Robert Kelly also offered the opportunity for the people who had purchased lots in South Hazelton to transfer to New Hazelton, but the railway had no intention of letting South Hazelton to be abandoned entirely and they rejected the offer.

== Union Bank robberies of 1913 and 1914 ==
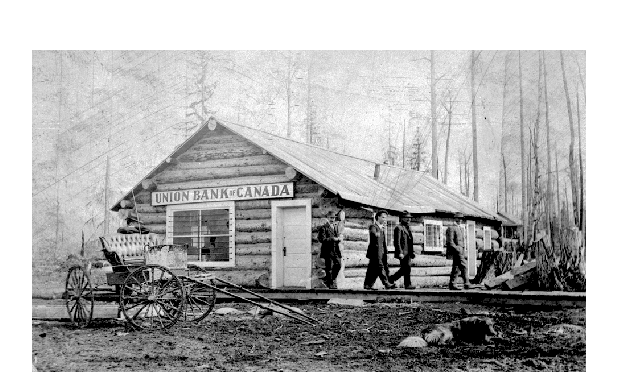
Union Bank

In November 1913, the Union Bank at New Hazelton was robbed by gunmen. In the commission of the crime, a young bank teller by the name of Jock McQueen was mortally wounded. Even though a posse was swiftly formed to go after them, the bandits got away with $16,000, a great deal of money in those days.

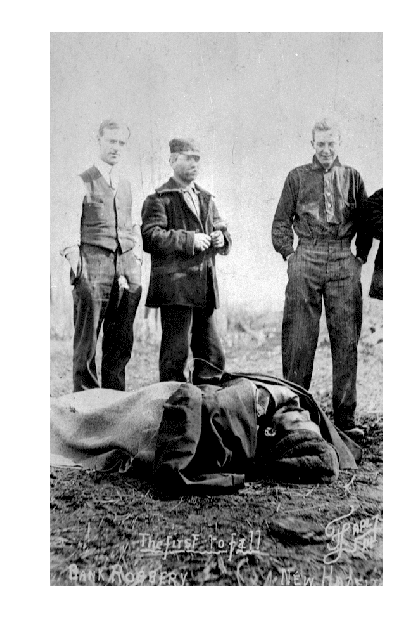
The 1st bandit to fall; Reverend Dan MacLean on right

The second robbery occurred on April 7, 1914, already a red letter day for the area as the last spike of the Grand Trunk Pacific Railway was being driven 180 miles away in Fort Fraser. New Hazelton was a busy little town that morning and excitement was high over the completion of the railroad. Many residents and some visiting dignitaries were planning on taking the train to Fort Fraser to watch the ceremonies associated with the driving of the last spike. John Oliver, who would one day become premier and have the town of Oliver named after him, was one of the visitors on that historic day. Little did anyone know that an equally historic event was about to happen right there in New Hazelton, one that would be remembered in hundreds of Canadian history books. Luckily, someone was there with a camera. Those pictures would become among the most famous of that era in British Columbia.

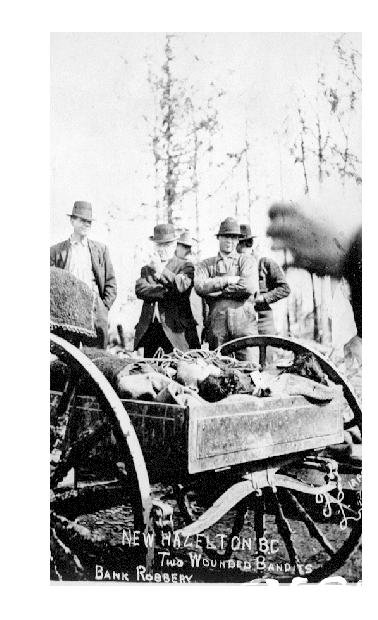
Wounded bandits in wagon

At 10:30 that morning seven men walked up the street towards the bank, all of them were wearing long coats, but so many people were out and about that these men went unnoticed. Six of them entered the bank while the seventh stayed in front and pulled a rifle out from underneath his coat and began firing shots up the street and people dashed for cover. Inside the bank, the other six had also drawn rifles and were demanding money from the teller, Robert Bishop. Ray Fenton, the bookkeeper was also behind the counter working on the books. When the robbers demanded the money, Fenton and Bishop weren't able to oblige them. Barrie Tatchell, the bank manager, had not yet arrived and he was the only one who had the combination of the safe. Tatchell was nearby, however, and upon hearing the shots, rushed to the house of Dan "Doc" MacLean, a local minister, who was also a veterinarian. Dan had guns and knew how to use them. Across the street from the bank another resident was getting ready to defend the town: Arizona Smith, who owned the local boarding house, was running for his gun. Tatchell found Dan and Dan grabbed his Lee–Enfield rifle and followed Tatchell to the place where they would make their stand, behind a large boulder of silver ore that had been donated to the town by the Silver Standard Mine.

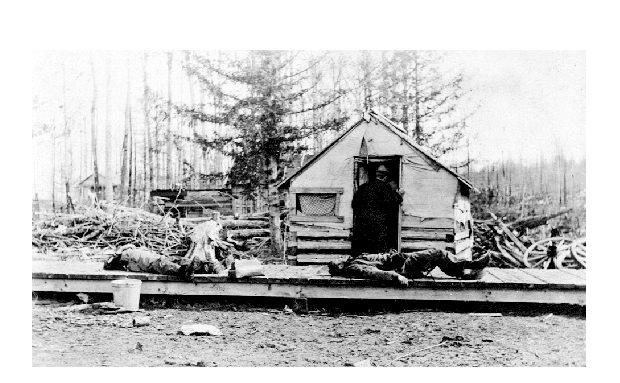
Dead bandits on boardwalk

Soon the guard in front of the bank had three men firing at him and he called out for assistance to his companions inside. When they came out, two were killed instantly and a third was mortally wounded. The four who were remaining, all of them wounded, fled off into the nearby woods. Dan MacLean and Sperry Cline got a posse together and caught three of them, but the seventh got away. The three wounded bandits were taken to the Hazelton hospital and once they recovered they were brought to trial. Judge Young from Prince Rupert came and presided over the proceedings. It came out in court that these were the same men from the first robbery and were therefore already guilty of murder and that the bullets they were using were dumdums, a clear indication that they were willing to commit murder again. Judge Young sentenced them all to twenty years at the provincial penitentiary in New Westminster.

The song "New Town" by Smithers musician Mark Perry tells the story of these events.

== Economy ==
New Hazelton is the service and commerce centre for the Kispiox Valley, which includes several first nation communities as well as residents of South Hazelton and Old Hazelton. The population of this area is approximately 6,500 people. Due to its location on Hwy 16 and CN Rail line, New Hazelton is home to most of the shopping, restaurants, and accommodations in the area.

Census population: New Hazelton
Year	Pop.	±%
1966	506	—
1971	475	−6.1%
1976	462	−2.7%
1981	712	+54.1%
1986	796	+11.8%
1991	786	−1.3%
1996	822	+4.6%
2001	750	−8.8%
2006	627	−16.4%
2011	666	+6.2%
2016	580	−12.9%
2021	602	+3.8%
Source: Statistics Canada

The New Hazelton railway station is served by Via Rail's Jasper – Prince Rupert train.

== Mayor and Council ==
Mayor: Gail Lowry

Councilors:Mike Weeber, Braunwyn Henwood, George Burns, Ray Sturney, Jutta Hobenshield, Allan Berg

Administrator: Wendy Hunt

== Demographics ==
In the 2021 Census of Population conducted by Statistics Canada, New Hazelton had a population of 602 living in 266 of its 305 total private dwellings, a change of 3.8% from its 2016 population of 580. With a land area of 24.34 km^{2} (9.40 sq mi), it had a population density of 24.7/km^{2} (64.1/sq mi) in 2021.

== Tourist attractions ==
- 'Ksan Historical Village is a Canadian heritage site located right where the Bulkley and Skeena rivers meet.
- Hagwilget Canyon Bridge is one of North America's highest suspension bridges.
- "Totem Pole Capital of the World" - tour the nearby native villages and see over four dozen classic totem poles.
- Steelhead fishing, at the nearby Kispiox River.
