= South Hazelton =

- Community
- Location of South Hazelton in British Columbia
- Coordinates: 55°13′59″N 127°40′05″W
- Country: Canada
- Province: British Columbia
- Region: Skeena
- Regional district: Kitimat–Stikine

Area
  - Total: 0.71 km^{2} (0.27 sq mi)

Population (2021)
  - Total: 193
  - Density: 270/km^{2} (700/sq mi)
- Time zone: UTC−07:00 (PT)
- Area codes: 250, 778, 236, & 672
- Highways: Highway 16 (TCH)
- Waterways: Skeena River

South Hazelton is an unincorporated community in the Skeena region of west central British Columbia, Canada. The place is on the east side of the Skeena River immediately south of the Bulkley River mouth. On BC Highway 16, the locality is by road about 73 kilometres (45 mi) northwest of Smithers and 132 kilometres (82 mi) northeast of Terrace. South Hazelton is one of the "Three Hazeltons", the other two being the original "Old" Hazelton to the north and New Hazelton to the east.

== New Hazelton was chosen initially ==
By 1910, the Grand Trunk Pacific Railway (GTP) construction had triggered prospecting and significant copper and silver ore discoveries in the general area. The transportation of ore would be very profitable for the GTP for several years from 1913 onward. However, immediate revenue would come from land sales. Where a landowner was unwilling to sell the land around a potential station site to the railway, the standard arrangement was for the railway to receive half the landowner's profits from a subsequent subdivision. Lot 882 (future New Hazelton) was the most suitable site for a potential station from an engineering and operating perspective. When Robert Kelly, the owner, would not consider profit sharing, the GTP looked westward for an alternative station site.

== Sealey/Ellison ==
A construction headquarters for Foley, Welch and Stewart (FW&S), the GTP prime contractor, Sealey was about 5 kilometres (3 mi) downriver from Hazelton and was the location of the new townsite of Ellison. Sealey (or Sealy, Seeley, Seely) was named after John Arthur Clark King Sealey (who presented similar surname variations). At the time, he was the proprietor of the Omineca Hotel in Hazelton. The Sealey post office existed from 1911 to 1912.

Believed to be named after Price Ellison, the new townsite, which lay west of the railway right-of-way, spread approximately between the alignments of present West Ave and Richmond Rd. The train station was to be placed at the northern end. After selling townsite lots, the GTP found that the cost of levelling the grade at the Ellison station would have been uneconomical. Consequently, the station location changed to Lot 851 (South Hazelton). Buyers of Ellison lots could swap them for South Hazelton ones.

In late August 1912, the GTP extended passenger and freight train runs onto the Skeena Crossing–Sealey segment. By November, all FW&S employees and supplies had moved to New Hazelton.

== Sealey Gulch trestle bridge ==
This railway trestle bridge stands between the alignments of present Willan Ave and West Ave.

In late July 1912, the concrete piers were completed. In early August 1912, the eastward advance of the GTP railhead from Prince Rupert reached the gulch, enabling the superstructure steel to be delivered by rail. In late August, the erection of the steel commenced. However, the prefabricated steel was found to be 1.5 metres (5 ft) too short, requiring modifications. In late September, the bridge superstructure was completed.

In 1914, a murder occurred at the location. During World War I, watchmen guarded the structure.

By 1929, shifting in the bridge foundations resulted in load limits, which meant halting locomotives at each end and pushing the respective cars across.

The rebuilt trestle remains in operation.

== South Hazelton/New Hazelton conflict ==
Additional distance and a difficult uphill wagon road made South Hazelton unsuitable for shipping ore. William John Sanders was the owner of Lot 851 (South Hazelton), which encompassed the station. Adjacent to the northwest is Anderson Flats Provincial Park, a mission site formerly owned by the Methodist Church. The first newspaper reference to the name South Hazelton was in October 1911.

Sanders had not only agreed to the profit-sharing arrangement but had also donated the lots for the Ellison relocators. The existing merchants in Hazelton received free lots. Auctioned in December 1911, only 82 lots had sold by January 1912. In December 1911, the Railway Commission ordered that a station be built on Lot 882 and none be built on Lot 851, which immediately prompted a buying spree of lots at New Hazelton.

In February 1912, the GTP appealed to the federal cabinet. That May, the cabinet referred the matter back to the Commission, which the following month reluctantly directed that a station could be built on Lot 851, but the one for Lot 882 must go ahead equally. The BC government demanded that the South Hazelton lot buyers be allowed to cancel their purchases. By May 1913, 58 of the 78 owners of the lots sold at auction exercised this option.

The rail head reached South Hazelton at the beginning of October 1912 and New Hazelton two weeks later. That month, the Commission approved the specific location of the South Hazelton station. That November, the scheduled Prince Rupert–South Hazelton service commenced, where a temporary depot was erected, followed by the standard-design Plan 100‐152 (Bohi's Type E) station building. The GTP dragged its feet in extending service to New Hazelton but was implemented in January 1913.

The GTP set an exorbitant rate for transporting ore from New Hazelton. Under the threat that ore would be shipped to Prince Rupert by steamboat, the rate was significantly reduced in June 1913. That July, Sanders accepted an offer of a three-sevenths interest in New Hazelton, the settlement of his $9,800 debt on Lot 851, and the transfer of the disgruntled lot buyers to the New Hazelton site.

In late 1915, the GTP used questionable statistics to seek approval for withdrawing the company agent from New Hazelton (to effectively close the station), but was unsuccessful.

== Rocher Déboulé Mountain ==
Rocher de Boule was the largest mine in the district. The GTP constructed a siding at Tramville, the lower terminal of the mine tramway, which was about 7 kilometres (4.3 mi) southwest of South Hazelton. The GTP's refusal to establish a station there caused delay and expense for both parties. In summer 1916, the mine complained that poor GTP service had filled up storage space in the ore bunker at Prince Rupert, the ore dump at Tramville, and at the mine head, causing the company to reduce production for the remainder of the year. The development of other claims on the mountain prompted the province to build an 18-kilometre (11 mi) winding road to Skeena Crossing. Although way freights stopped at that location, the GTP refused to construct a siding and station. In response to complaints, the Railway Commission ordered the GTP to install a siding and small station within 30 days.

== General railway operations ==
In 1918, a conductor was fatally crushed when trapped by a closing gravel car.

In 1952, a man sustained fatal injuries when train wheels cut off both his legs.

In 1966, a passenger train struck a vehicle at the Carnaby railway crossing , killing an occupant.

In 2018, 27 cars of a westbound coal train derailed.

Train Timetables (Regular stop or Flag stop)
	Mile	1914	1920	1925	1932	1935	1943	1950	1956	1960	1963	1967	1968
Andimaul	1599.8	Flag	Flag	Flag	Flag	Flag	Flag	Flag	Flag				
Nash	1595.2	Flag	Flag	Flag	Flag	Flag	Flag	Flag	Flag	Flag	Flag	Flag	
Skeena Crossing	1593.4		Flag	Flag	Flag	Flag	Reg.	Reg.	Reg.	Flag	Flag	Both	Both
Carnaby	1588.0	Flag	Flag	Flag	Flag	Flag	Flag	Flag	Flag				
Hazelton	1581.0	Reg.	Reg.	Reg.	Reg.	Reg.	Reg.	Reg.	Reg.	Flag	Flag	Flag	
New Hazelton	1577.3	Reg.	Reg.	Reg.	Reg.	Reg.	Reg.	Reg.	Reg.	Reg.	Reg.	Reg.	Reg.
Duncanan	1570.7	Flag											
Bulkley Canyon	1570.7		Flag	Flag	Flag	Flag	Flag	Flag	Flag		Flag	Flag	
Beament	1563.3	Flag	Flag	Flag	Flag	Flag	Flag	Flag	Flag				

== Ferries ==
A Sealey–Hazelton ferry service began in 1911. That year, the A. Ross ferry drifted downstream after vandals cut the mooring ropes. In 1912, when a guy cable snapped, the new ferry drifted several hundred feet downstream, prompting those on board to swim to safety. The next year, the Ross ferry did not recommence, having been superseded by the railway.

In 1910, Richard S. Sargent was awarded the charter for a ferry across the Bulkley River mouth but failed to begin a service. In the absence of ferries, canoe operators enjoyed a lucrative trade. Sargent had delayed any action because a bridge plan appeared imminent. In April 1912, he expressed a willingness to transfer the charter. Hazelton businessmen launched a large scow that May and the South Hazelton cable ferry became fully operational in June.

In 1913, the Bulkley ferry charter was tendered but instead was taken over by the province which installed a new pontoon ferry. An ice bridge was created that winter. In 1914, the South Hazelton ferry hours were extended to nighttime.

In January 1917, a bridge over the Bulkley opened, which replaced the ferry. That November, the former ferry broke loose during a relocation and beached at Gitsegukla, where it was abandoned.

== Community ==
In 1913, Sealey's hotel was built. At this time, general development significantly lagged behind New Hazelton. Some stores were planning to relocate from Hazelton to South Hazelton, but this did not happen, because South Hazelton was described as one or two large empty buildings in late 1914. In 1918, the South Hazelton Hotel opened. First mentioned in 1925 and described as either the Grandview or South Hazelton hotel it is unclear if this lone hotel is the same as the 1918 one. The post office existed from 1923–1924, before reopening in 1936. At that time, the Sargent family's general store likely opened.

In 1931, the school was founded.

In 1958, Western Coach Lines inaugurated a Prince Rupert–Prince George bus service, which included a scheduled stop at South Hazelton. The prior year, volunteers poured into the Anglican Church foundation. Initially called St. Crispin's, the church was later renamed St. John the Baptist. Around the mid-1970s, the congregation became inactive.

Census population: South Hazelton
Year	Pop.	±%
1966	467	—
1971	483	+3.4%
1976		—
1981		—
1986		—
1991	654	—
1996		—
2001		—
2006	213	—
2011	211	−0.9%
2016	199	−5.7%
2021	193	−3.0%
Source: Statistics Canada

Peaks Drive-In screened movies from the early 1960s to at least the mid-1980s.

In 1965, the volunteer fire department bought a used pumper truck. Later that decade, the Cataline Motel opened. In 1975, four units were added to the motel bringing the total to 19 units. Repurposing had reduced the number to 17 units plus 22 RV sites by the early 1990s. The motel closed in 2023 with a possibility of reopening the next year.

When the highway bypass was built in 1971, businesses on the former thoroughfare lost through traffic. In 1975, a two-bay fire hall was erected.

The post office operated at least into the late 1980s.

Fire destroyed the Grandview Hotel in 1992 and the school the following year. After more than two years in portables, the new school building opened.

A general store existed into the 1990s but was vacant by the early 2000s. The Garage Pub and Grill, which opened in 1997, had previously been a service station for decades. The restaurant closed in 2003, and the building was demolished in 2012.

In 2010, the South Hazelton Elementary School closed.

The current passenger transit provider is BC Transit.

== Notable people ==
- Regan Yee, (1995– ), athlete, resident.

== Forestry ==
After World War II, a range of sawmills operated for various periods in South Hazelton.

A 1972 fire totally destroyed the Rim Forest Products sawmill. The rebuilt mill closed in July 1974 but was reopened by the receiver in December.

In 1981, CanCel bought the Rim Forest Products mill. On the opening of the new mill at Carnaby in 1987, the union for the existing South Hazelton mill demanded that its members have hiring priority.

In June 1988, the South Hazelton mill closed. In May 1989, Stege Logging bought the mill site.

In late 1991, Stege began production at the rebuilt sawmill. In 1995, fire razed much of the Isolite Stege Forest Products mill.

== Maps ==
- Lot map. 1911.
- Mining map. 1910s.
- "Standard Oil BC map". www.davidrumsey.com. 1937.
- "Shell BC map". www.davidrumsey.com. 1956.

== See also ==
- List of Inland Ferries in British Columbia
