= Sperry Cline =

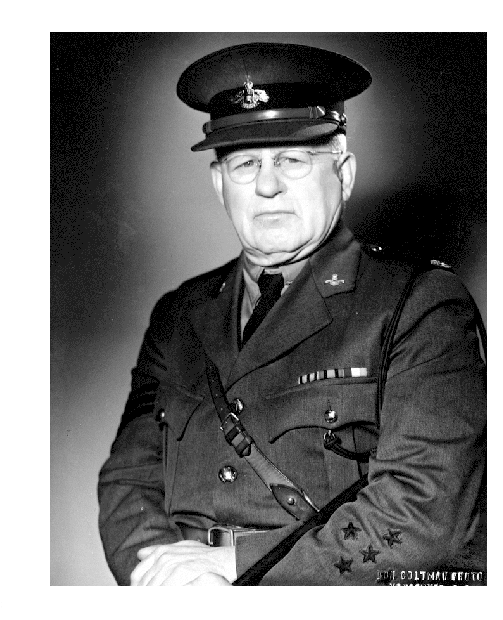
Sergeant Sperry Cline 1946

Sperry Cline, DCM (26 May 1881 – 8 May 1964) was a Canadian frontier policeman and author in British Columbia.

== Early life ==
Cline was born near St. Thomas, Ontario, to an ethnic German family, the son of Jonas and Marie Cline. The family were Baptist. In his teens, he traveled to England and joined the British South Africa Company's cavalry. He rode with the Matabele Field Force for the defence of Bulawayo and then stayed in South Africa, where he later fought in the Boer War, earning a Distinguished Conduct Medal.

== Hazelton ==
After recovering from malaria, Cline returned to Canada and moved to Hazelton, British Columbia in the winter of 1904. In Hazelton he tried his hand at many jobs, beginning with mail delivery in the form of mushing the huskies down the frozen Skeena River to the coast and back again. He freighted supplies by canoe, worked as a pilot on a sailing sloop and was a foreman at the Silver Standard mine. In 1914, he finally found his niche. On the day of the second robbery at the Union Bank in New Hazelton, Cline was asked by Hazelton's Chief Constable, Ernie Gammon, to join the posse that would capture three of the four surviving bandits. Shortly thereafter, Cline joined the police force at Hazelton and would be a policeman in British Columbia for the next thirty-two years. He acquired the nickname "Dutch" because of his tendency to pepper his English language with a liberal smattering of Cape Dutch, Swahili and Chinook, often all in the same sentence.

While Cline lived in Hazelton he became acquainted with the mule-packer Cataline and the two men would often engage in long conversations. To a casual eavesdropper, these conversations would have sounded quite strange indeed: like Cline, Cataline also spoke in several different languages at once—in Cataline's case, French, Spanish, and one of his own invention. Nevertheless, the two men understood each other perfectly.

As a frontier policeman, Cline often found himself in the role of prosecuting attorney as well as arresting officer. It was through these court battles that he became acquainted with the criminal defense lawyer, Stuart Hendersen. In 1919, Cline contacted Hendersen to represent Simon Gunanoot. The case received national press attention and was one of the most talked about trials of that era. Gunanoot was found not guilty.

Throughout his years on the Hazelton police force, he became known as a man of common sense and integrity, often willing to apply practical solutions to a situation, rather than always going "by the book". He had a wheelbarrow in which he would haul the patrons of the local hotels who had imbibed too freely off to the Skookum House, (jail). Cline jokingly referred to his wheelbarrow as the "Hazelton Patrol Wagon". His earlier experience with mushing sled dogs would come in handy on many occasions, once he took a dog team 170 out of town to an isolated cabin along the Yukon Telegraph Line, to investigate the disappearance of a lineman who, as it turned out, had frozen to death.

When Cline left Hazelton in the 1920s, he moved onto the police force in Smithers and then on to the Chemainus police force, from where he was transferred to the Police Training School in Victoria.

== Author ==
Cline retired from the British Columbia Provincial Police in 1946 and went on to write a series of articles about his adventures in Hazelton, which he entitled Policing the Skeena. Many of these stories would be featured in the magazine BC Outdoors and some would go on to be published in Art Down's Pioneer Days in British Columbia series.

With pioneer sternwheeler historian, Wiggs O'Neill, Cline co-authored, Along the Totem Trail: Port Essington to Hazelton.

Cline died in Burnaby on 8 May 1964.

== Recognition ==
Near Hazelton, Cline Peak and Sperry Creek were named in his honour.
