= Bulkley Junction Provincial Park =

Provincial park in British Columbia, Canada

- IUCN category II (national park)
- Location within British Columbia
- Interactive map of Bulkley Junction Provincial Park
- Location: Cassiar Land District, British Columbia, Canada
- Nearest city: Hazelton, BC
- Coordinates: 55°14′14″N 127°40′44″W
- Area: 169 ha (420 acres)
- Established: July 23, 1997
- Governing body: BC Parks

Bulkley Junction Provincial Park is a provincial park in British Columbia, Canada, located on the west side of the Skeena River opposite Hazelton. It was established in 1997 and expanded in 2004 from 133 ha. to its current size of 169 ha.
