= Pacific, British Columbia =

Pacific
- Location of Pacific in British Columbia
- Coordinates: 54°45′59″N 128°15′05″W
- Country: Canada
- Province: British Columbia
- Region: Skeena
- Regional district: Kitimat–Stikine
- Time zone: UTC-8 (PST)
  - Summer (DST): UTC-7 (PDT)
- Area codes: 250, 778, 236, & 672
- Highways: Highway 16 (TCH)
- Waterways: Skeena River

Pacific is a railway point in the Skeena region of west central British Columbia. On the western shore of the Skeena River, no direct link exists to the highway section on the eastern shore near the mouth of Legate Creek. On BC Highway 16, the locality is by road about 164 kilometres (102 mi) west of Smithers and 40 kilometres (25 mi) northeast of Terrace.

== Jens Anderson ==
In 1909, Jens Anderson established a homestead. Anderson Island in the Skeena identified the location. He sold most of his land to the Grand Trunk Pacific Railway (GTP) and the balance to Charles William Digby Clifford. Apparently, Anderson, Clifford, and J.W. Patterson were partners in the Nicholl Hotel, of which Anderson was the proprietor.

== Railway ==
During the GTP construction, a camp was established at Mile 119, the future station site. In early February 1912, the eastward advance of the GTP rail head from Prince Rupert passed through this point and reached Mile 123.

In March, the Mile 119 divisional point was still unnamed. By April, Amundsen was proposed. By June, Nicholl had been chosen instead as the name. George Alexander McNicholl was the GTP superintendent at Prince Rupert. By August, a steam shovel was clearing and grading the railyard site.

In 1913, a GTP Plan 100‐155 station building was erected, which included dining facilities. By early 1914, the station had been renamed as Pacific to avoid confusion with the Nichol station, east of Isle Pierre.

During the 1914/15 winter, a roundhouse, machine shop, and other divisional point facilities were built. A turntable connected the 12-stall roundhouse (GTP Plan 120‐115) and a wye.

In 1920, a new roadmaster's office was completed and train crew runs were shortened to terminate at Pacific.

In 1922, while attempting to board an eastbound Canadian National Railway (CN) freight train, a freighthopper slipped beneath the wheels, which ran over his legs.

In 1923, two freight cars derailed.

In 1929, a CN worker broke his ribs when he fell from a trestle.

In 1933, an eastbound passenger train, and the relief train sent to assist, both derailed west of Pacific.

In 1934, fire destroyed the two-storey station. The next year, a GTP Plan 100‐277 station building was erected. The station restaurant existed at least until the 1940s.

In 1947, the bridge and building foreman suffered fatal injuries when thrown from a speeder, which struck a fallen rock just west of Dorreen.

In 1950, one of the largest dynamite blasts in BC at the time occurred when 55,600 kilograms (122,500 lb) of explosives were detonated at the CN pit to produce rock for grade construction.

In 1953, 11 cars of a westbound freight train derailed to the west.

In 1959, the divisional point was transferred to Terrace and the roundhouse demolished. All that remains of the structure are a concrete foundation, loose discarded bricks, and some railway track. In 2013, the roundhouse was designated a national historic site.

The passing track is 3.8 kilometres (12,477 ft).

A trackside signpost marks the Pacific flag stop for Via Rail's Jasper–Prince Rupert train.

== Community ==
In May 1912, the GTP townsite lots were readying for sale. Being the first divisional point east of Prince Rupert, rapid growth was anticipated.

Thomas H. McCubbin was the inaugural postmaster 1913–1939. He was also a deputy mining recorder and notary public. Pacific was the headquarters for the mining district of Lorne, Fiddler, Chindemash, Hardscrabble, Carpenter, Legate, and Oliver creeks, where a number of small mining operations were located.

In 1916–17, the school opened. McCubbin ran the general store.

In the mid-1920s, Nel Thompson opened a pool hall, later built the community hall, and resided until the early 1970s.

In 1956–57, the school closed, followed by the post office in 1958. After the divisional point moved, the remaining residents largely departed Pacific, leaving the buildings vacant.

In summer 1977, hippies gathered, including Bob Haspeck. The next summer, nine bought most of the town to create a small colony, which lasted until 1981. In 1994, Haspeck returned to be the sole permanent resident. Within a few years, the remnants of the community hall, general store and Nicholl Hotel were either collapsed or burned timber, and the schoolhouse was barely standing.

In 2006, Haspeck died of a heart attack in a hut at Pacific.

== Ferry ==
In 1916, the subsidised seasonal ferry was established.

The government replaced the rowboat in 1922–23 with a scow of the reaction ferry type.

During the 1936 flood, the ferry buildings were lost, as was the bridge across the slough behind the station.

In 1946–47, the ferry service reverted to a rowboat.

In 1949, the service was discontinued.

== Maps ==
- "Standard Oil BC map". www.davidrumsey.com. 1937.
- "Shell BC map". www.davidrumsey.com. 1956.

== Legate Creek ==
Legate Creek marks the boundary between the Coastal Western Hemlock Zone and the Interior Cedar-Hemlock Zone. The latter includes species combinations unseen in other forest zones.

The creek is a 23-kilometre (14 mi) swift mountain stream, which enters the Skeena from the east, across the river from Pacific. The influence of coastal rains allows small trees and shrubs to thrive. The dense vegetation and rugged topography made the limited early mining activity arduous. During the mid-1910s, about 6 kilometres (4 mi) of good trail was built, which could handle ore sleighs during winter. By 1925, the ferry and an excellent 19-kilometre (12 mi) packhorse trail improved access.

In 1978, 2004, and 2007, debris flows from the creek covered the highway. During the 2007 event, two people were buried alive. Their bodies were later recovered.

In 2008, a Bell 206L helicopter was carrying a drill rig attached to a long line. After ascending the creek, the load became lodged in trees at the landing site. The spinning helicopter crashed and the pilot later died of his injuries.

== Pitman ==
West of Pacific, Pitman acknowledged William Pitman Lett Hinton, GTP vice-president and general manager.

The post office operated 1911–1966.

Immediately north, the single lane Skeena West Bridge was built by forestry interests to provide highway access to logging on the west side of the river.

== See also ==
- List of Inland Ferries in British Columbia
