= Woodcock Airport =

- IATA: none; ICAO: none; TC LID: CBQ8

Summary
- Airport type: Public
- Operator: M. Malott; R. MacKillop
- Location: Woodcock, British Columbia, Canada
- Time zone: MST (UTC−07:00)
- Elevation AMSL: 537 ft / 164 m
- Coordinates: 55°04′N 128°14′W

Map
- Location in British Columbia

Runways
Direction	Length		Surface
Direction	ft	m	Surface
02/20	3,350	1,021	Asphalt
- Sources: Canada Flight Supplement

Woodcock Airport (TC LID: CBQ8) is a registered aerodrome located 3.8 nautical miles (7.0 km; 4.4 mi) northeast of Woodcock, British Columbia, Canada.

== Military use ==
During World War II, RCAF squadrons prepared for a Japanese attack. Woodcock was planned as an emergency airfield between Smithers and Terrace. Construction commenced in late 1942, but heavy snowfall that winter halted site work. However, a maintenance crew and ground unit resided over the winter. By June 1943, erection of the wireless building was beginning, the sewerage plant was progressing, and the remaining buildings were 50 per cent complete. Visits that August were DOT inspectors in a Beechcraft Model 18 to assess the facility, a RCAF Cessna Crane, and a RCAF Bolingbroke. September landings were a RCAF Goose, a DOT Lockheed 12, and a RCAF Cessna Crane. The station diary records no further arrivals at this the No. 15 Staging Unit.

== Commercial use ==
After the war, administration of the airstrip passed from the DND to the DOT. Aircraft passing through the narrow Skeena River valley, which experienced weather-related difficulties, could land in emergencies.

In 1953, prior to the introduction of the Canadian Pacific Air Lines Edmonton–Terrace route, an air reconnaissance was made of the strip, which was to be used as an alternative field when the air approach to Terrace was blanketed by fog or low clouds. No such use is known.

== Recreational use ==
After a period of neglect, the aerodrome was adopted by the Terrace Skydiving Club 1969–2004, which maintained the runway until the club relocated to Beaverley Airport.

A Royal Canadian Air Cadets squadron that had their own self-sustained glider program used the facility between 1975 and 1986. At summer camps, students gained experience in both glider and powered flying. The absence of on-site emergency services ended the Woodcock use.

During the 1980s, artist Carl Chaplin converted a concrete bunker into a home and studio, where he produced canvases, while contemplating World War III. That decade, a Scottish Aviation Twin Pioneer left parked was vandalized. After partial restoration, the aircraft was sold for parts.

In 2019, members of the Vanderhoof Flying club and the BC General Aviation Association (BCGA) flew or drove in to spend a long weekend cleaning up the crumbling runway, which had not been maintained for decades but had been used occasionally by pilots willing to negotiate the overgrowth. The volunteer work party cut down small trees growing on the runway and scraped moss to create a useable 1,700 feet (520 m) section down the middle of the airstrip.

== Video media ==
The airstrip featured in episode 6 of LoadingReadyRun's Road Quest with the teams competing in a half kilometre drag race which was dubbed the inaugural 'Woodcock 500'.
