= Charles William Digby Clifford =

Canadian politician (1842–1916)

Charles William Digby Clifford (October 14, 1842 – May 10, 1916) was an Irish-born miner, trader, hotel owner and political figure in British Columbia. He represented Cassiar from 1898 to 1903 and Skeena from 1903 to 1907 as a Conservative in the Legislative Assembly of British Columbia. He did not seek re-election in the 1907 provincial election.

He was born in Carrick-on-Shannon, County Leitrim, the son of Reverend R. S. Clifford and Harriet Young, and was educated in London. In 1888, he married Lucy Margaret McNeill. Clifford was a postmaster for the Hudson's Bay Company at Hazelton from 1885 to 1887; he was employed as a clerk there from 1887 to 1891 and at Fort Simpson from 1891 to 1896. He later owned a hotel and general store in Kitselas. In 1912, in partnership with Nels Anderson and John Walker "Jack" Patterson, he built the Nicholl Hotel. He died in Vancouver at the age of 73.
