= Cataline =

Famous mule packer

Jean-Jacques Caux, known as Cataline, was the most famous mule packer of the Canadian West.

== Biography ==
Jean Jacques Caux, known as Cataline, was born in rural southern France around 1830, most likely in a town called Oloron in the Bearn region. In 1858 the town joined up with Ste-Marie, so the town then became Oloron-Sainte-Marie.

When he first came to what was later known as British Columbia he packed on a small scale with only one animal. He eventually worked his way up to having larger pack trains with up to 60 animals, according to some, and it is said he had at least four pack trains.

== The early years ==
Cataline packed from Yale to Barkerville during the Cariboo Gold Rush, working mostly with experienced Mexican packers. He lived with a NLaka'pamux woman from Spuzzum called Amelia York, native name C'eyxkn. Jean had at least two children with her; the first was William Benjamin, the second was Rhoda Dominic Urquhart. It is also possible that another child, Clara Dominic Clare who had many descendants, was also Jean Caux's child. Genealogical research is being done to ascertain if Jean Caux is actually their ancestor.

In the 1880s, his packing partner was Joe Castillou, another Frenchman who was mistaken as a Spaniard; because of his name they called him 'Castillion'. Joe eventually went his own way from Cataline's pack train, and settled in Merritt, BC, Canada. He is commemorated in the Nicola Valley Museum in Merritt, with his son Henry Castillou, the "Cowboy Judge of the Cariboo", and alongside the display of the famed anthropologist James Teit; a researcher of aboriginal culture who worked for the Chicago Museum of Natural History. Caux and Castillou did some packing trips for James Teit, which is where young Henry acquired his taste for the local culture.

Perhaps people thought Caux & Castillou were Spanish because they used Spanish words for packing, such as secundo and aparejo. It is not hard to determine where these words originated when one remembers that these men grew up at the base of the Pyrenees Mountains, which is the border of Spain & France. However, as most packers in the early years in BC were Mexican, it is most likely that Spanish became the language of the profession for that reason.

Although the exact date of his arrival in British Columbia is unknown, it is recorded that he was packing at the beginning of the Fraser Canyon Gold Rush in 1858 and continued until 1912, a span of 54 years.

== A man with unique traits ==
Cataline was known to wear the same type of clothing year round: a boiled white shirt, heavy woolen pants, riding boots and no socks. When he had business to conduct, he added a collar, tie and a French hat to his apparel.

One of the most famous stories is that he used to rub liquor into his hair. He would drink his cognac or whisky, leaving a small amount to pour into his hand, and rub it into his hair; saying "A liddle insida, a liddle outsida. Bon! She maka da hair grow!"

On every trip he brought along a chair made of birch and rawhide where he would sit as he negotiated his business, while everyone else sat on the ground. Though it has been said he was illiterate, he had been know to memorize and keep his business records in his head without ever making a single note. He could sign his name with a flourish, leading to speculation if he actually was illiterate.

== Pack trains ==
Cataline's pack train usually consisted of sixty mules. Each outfit also employed six or more men, a foreman, also known as a corregidor, a second man, known as a secundo, a cook and several muleteers. The pack mules could carry 250–300 pounds and could navigate very difficult trails. Cataline's mules were so well trained that when the corregidor rang a signal bell, they would go to their own packs and wait to be loaded. In Cataline's outfit, around the turn of the century, his corregidor was Ah Gun and his secundo was Dave Wiggins.

Even though he used over sixty mules, he knew to the item what each of them carried, where they were being delivered to and what he had to charge. And although he ran mule trains for over half a century it was said he never lost a pound of cargo, except in one instance when his secundo, upon smelling a two-pound package of Limburger cheese, decided it was rotten and threw it away. Once aware of the error, Cataline made sure it was replaced and delivered. Another story about him involves a loan that he had to make after a disease had killed several of his mules. The bank manager questioned Cataline's collateral, wondering how many mules and horses he owned before consenting to lend him the money. When Cataline returned to the bank in the fall to repay the debt, he counted out the exact amount owing and paid it in full. The bank manager noted that Cataline had more money on his person and suggested that he deposit it in the bank. Cataline responded with a query as to how many horses and mules the bank owned, and upon learning it was none, decided to keep his money.

== After the CPR ==
With the completion of the Canadian Pacific Railway, he moved his headquarters to Ashcroft. Amelia remained in Spuzzum, but he continued to support her and her children, always in the form of $20 gold coins. During this period, he was friends with Judge Matthew Baillie Begbie, who once held an impromptu court to provide Cataline with Canadian citizenship when his squatting rights were questioned. In 1897, Cataline led a pack train all the way from Ashcroft, then the southern terminus of the Cariboo Road, all the way to the Yukon Territory.

== Quesnel and Hazelton ==
When the construction of the Grand Trunk Pacific Railway was announced, Cataline moved his operations to Quesnel to better serve the booming Central Interior. He packed throughout the Cariboo, Central Interior and Skeena River district until 1912 when he retired in Hazelton. In 1920 he decided to spend his remaining winters in Victoria, but after spending just one winter in the Dominion Hotel, he returned to Hazelton for the rest of his days. He died in October 1922 at the age of 85 and is buried in the Gitanmaax cemetery. A brass plaque on his cairn simply reads "Jean Caux–Cataline, the packer".

=== Cataline in books and film ===
- The Legend of Cataline, a film by Red Letter Films
- Cataline from Pioneer Days in British Columbia Volume 1 Article 20, Sperry Cline, Art Downs editor. ISBN Unknown
- Jean Caux 'The Man they called Cataline' from Frontier Days in British Columbia
- The Far Land, Eva MacLean ISBN 0-920576-41-9
- Heritage of Canada ISBN 0-88850-065-3

=== Places named after Cataline ===
- Cataline Elementary School in Williams Lake, British Columbia
- Cataline Drive in Williams Lake, British Columbia, Canada
- Cataline Creek in the Kispiox region near Hazelton
- Cataline Motor Inn, Fraser Lake, British Columbia, Canada
- Cataline Motel & RV Park, Hazelton, British Columbia, Canada
