= Gitsegukla =

- Community
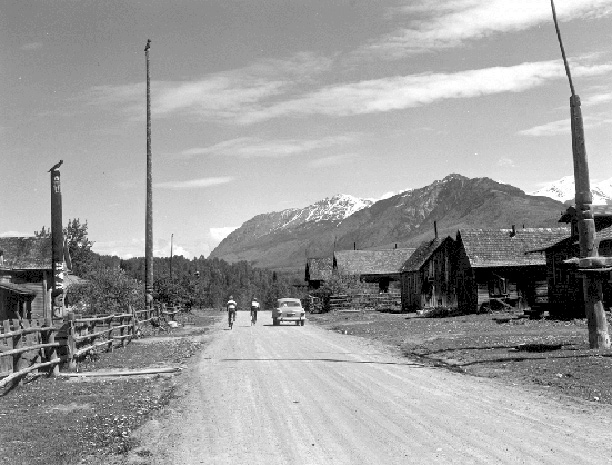
- Gitsegukla, 1954.

- Location of Gitsegukla in British Columbia
- Coordinates: 55°04′59″N 127°50′05″W
- Country: Canada
- Province: British Columbia
- Region: Skeena
- Regional district: Kitimat–Stikine

Government
  - Type: Chief-Council Government

Area
  - Total: 10.98 km^{2} (4.24 sq mi)

Population (2021)
  - Total: 444
  - Density: 40.4/km^{2} (105/sq mi)
- Time zone: UTC-8 (PST)
  - Summer (DST): UTC-7 (PDT)
- Postal code: V0J 2J3
- Area codes: 250, 778, 236, & 672
- Highways: Highway 16 (TCH)
- Waterways: Skeena River
- Website: Official website

Gitsegukla (also variants of Kitsegeucla or Skeena Crossing) is an unincorporated community in the Skeena region of west central British Columbia, Canada. The place is on the southeast side of the Skeena River adjacent to the Kitseguecla River mouth. On BC Highway 16, the locality is by road about 94 kilometres (58 mi) northwest of Smithers and 113 kilometres (70 mi) northeast of Terrace.

== Name origin ==
In the Gitxsan language, Gitsegukla means the "people living under the precipice" or more specifically under the "Segukla" or "sharp-pointed" mountain, a reference to the characteristics of Kitseguecla Mountain. By the 1890s, the Kitseguecla River name was well established.

The name Skeena Crossing alluded to the railway bridge construction. The earliest newspaper references were June 1910 to Skeena crossing and October 1910 to Skeena Crossing, a steamboat stop.

== First Nations ==
First Nations have inhabited the area for over six thousand years.

During the Omineca Gold Rush the Skeena River became a supply route for miners and traders to the northern interior. Kitsegukla, which was one of the seven Gitxsan winter villages, lay in a small canyon a short distance below the present village. About a dozen longhouses accommodated the village of 250–300 people. In early June 1872, a party in two canoes carrying both European and indigenous occupants failed to fully extinguish their camp fire at an adjacent site. The resulting blaze destroyed 12 totem poles, the longhouses, and the contents. Beside the cultural loss, the monetary value was estimated at $6,000.

During the preceding period, seven Gitxsan members had drowned while carrying freight for a Hazelton merchant in their canoes. These combined events prompted a Gitsegukla blockade of the river. Consequently, the merchant paid compensation for the drownings. A few weeks after the fire, the blockade was lifted on the understanding that the government would compensate for the fire loss. When a settlement did not appear imminent, the Gitsegukla again closed the river to freight traffic.

A delegation of five Gitsegukla chiefs travelled to Metlakatla to meet Lieutenant Governor Trutch, who arrived aboard HMS Scout in early August. Trutch warned the chiefs not to repeat such blockades and made what he considered a $600 ex gratia payment. Subsequently, the community moved slightly upriver to the second village.

In 1885, when Methodist missionary Rev. W.H. Pierce came, he was loaned a building for a residence, church services, and a day school. The next year, a new building was erected for this purpose. During the 1889–90 winter, the Christians relocated upriver to form a new village in what became the Carnaby area. The village was called New Kitzegucla.

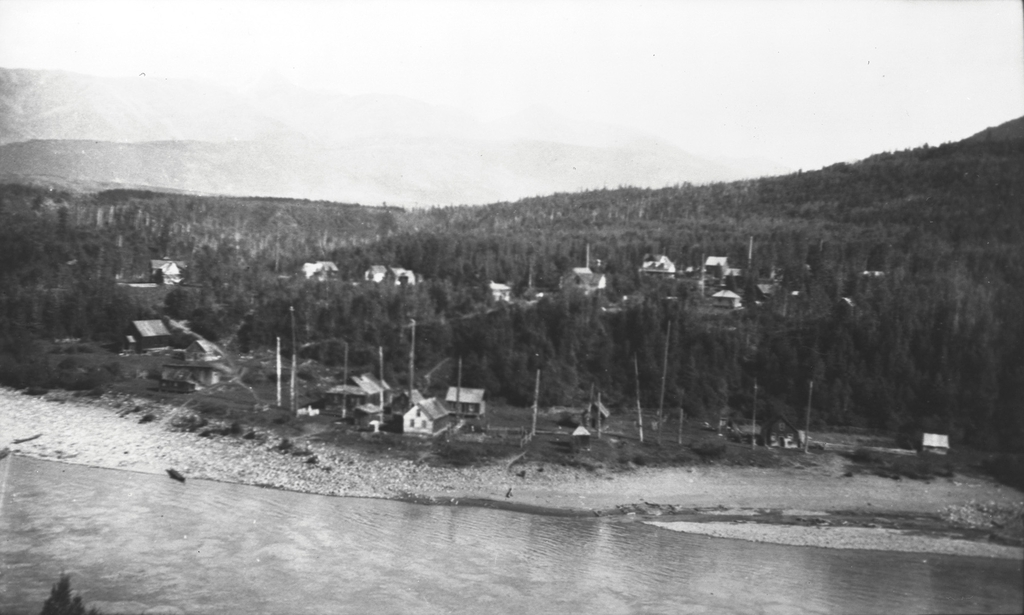
Gitxsan village, Gitsegukla, 1926.

In 1892, most returned to the former village. In 1895, the remainder returned and Rev. Pierce left for the coast. A series of missionaries then filled the Kitzegucla posting. A few families moved downriver to the village at Andimaul, where the Salvation Army ministered. The Methodist Church, which became part of the United Church, ran the federal government-funded Kitsegukla First Nations school 1897–1985.

The second village lost many houses in the 1914 flood and every structure in the 1936 flood, which prompted the move to the current higher site.

In 1921, a new schoolhouse was erected.

Around 1933, a new church building was erected at Gitsegucla.

Jean Virginia (Ginny) Sampare, an eighteen-year old female, was last seen near the overpass in October 1971.

In 2021, the population on the reserve was 444.

The community lies on the Gitsegukla Indian Reserve No. 1. The Gitsegukla Elementary School (grades K–7) infuses the BC curriculum with Gitxsan culture. The United church building remains standing. The community possesses neither a gas station nor convenience store.

== Steamboats and ferries ==
In fall 1906, the small sternwheeler Pheasant steamed up the Skeena to two spots to blast out rocks hindering navigation. On encountering low water when returning downstream, the vessel became wrecked upon protruding rocks. The location was Redrock Canyon near the later railway bridge.

The outflow of the Kitseguecla River forms the long Jackman's Eddy in the Kitseguecla Rapids. The swift white water of the rapids has been one of the more challenging parts of the Skeena River.

Foley, Welch and Stewart (FW&S), the Grand Trunk Pacific Railway (GTP) prime contractor, operated a fleet on the Skeena, during the navigation season, which closed for five or six months over the winter.

In February 1911, a ferry charter across the Skeena was tendered. The cable ferry operated until the bridge was completed. The fare to cross was 50 cents.

When the 1912 river season commenced, only the FW&S Omineca was needed for the run from the crossing to Sealey.

== Skeena Crossing bridge and railway construction ==
In July 1911, the western abutment of the bridge was finished. That October, work commenced on the piers. The substructure comprises the abutments and two concrete piers in the river and one on land.

In March 1912, the eastward advance of the GTP rail head from Prince Rupert reached the bridge. That June, a scheduled Prince Rupert–Skeena Crossing service replaced construction trains from Vanarsdol.

In early July the superstructure was complete and the rail head proceeded an additional 6 kilometres (4 mi) eastward. Built by the Canadian Bridge Company, the length is 288 metres (945 ft) and the height above the river is 50 metres (160 ft). About a week later, an intoxicated man fell from the bridge and assumedly drowned.

That September, the GTP telegraph and freight office moved to Sealey.

During World War II, the former hotel housed the troops who guarded the bridge.

== Road passengers and freight ==
A stage ran to the Hazelton area during wintertime. Immediately upstream of the bridge construction, an aerial tramway was installed across the Skeena in March 1912, similar to the one at Kitselas Canyon. At that time, stables were built to house about 100 horses for hauling wagons to the Hazelton area. That year, passengers completed their journey by either ferrying across the Skeena and taking a stage to Hazelton or boarding a steamboat.

Heavy rains in 1934 undermined the highway bridge over the Kitsequecla River, rendering it unsafe. In 1938–39, the structure was replaced.

In 1958, Western Coach Lines inaugurated a Prince Rupert–Prince George bus service, which included a scheduled stop at Skeena Crossing.

The current passenger transit providers for Gitsegukla are BC Bus North and BC Transit.

== Railway operations ==
By 1914, the place was an unofficial flag stop.

The development of several claims on Rocher Déboulé Mountain prompted the province to build an 18-kilometre (11 mi) winding road to Skeena Crossing. Although way freights stopped at that location, the GTP refused to construct a siding and station. In response to complaints, the Railway Commission ordered the GTP in 1916 to install a siding and small station within 30 days.

In 1987, 20 cars of a coal train derailed.

Train Timetables (Regular stop or Flag stop)
	Mile	1914	1920	1925	1932	1935	1943	1950	1956	1960	1965	1970	1975	1980	1985	1988	1989
Kitwanga	1604.5	Both	Reg.	Reg.	Reg.	Reg.	Reg.	Reg.	Reg.	Reg.	Reg.	Reg.	Reg.	Reg.	Reg.	Reg.	Flag
Andimaul	1599.8	Flag	Flag	Flag	Flag	Flag	Flag	Flag	Flag								
Nash	1595.2	Flag	Flag	Flag	Flag	Flag	Flag	Flag	Flag	Flag	Flag						
Skeena Crossing	1593.4		Flag	Flag	Flag	Flag	Reg.	Reg.	Reg.	Flag	Flag	Flag	Flag	Flag	Flag	Flag	
Carnaby	1588.0	Flag	Flag	Flag	Flag	Flag	Flag	Flag	Flag								
Hazelton	1581.0	Reg.	Reg.	Reg.	Reg.	Reg.	Reg.	Reg.	Reg.	Flag	Flag						
New Hazelton	1577.3	Reg.	Reg.	Reg.	Reg.	Reg.	Reg.	Reg.	Reg.	Reg.	Reg.	Reg.	Reg.	Reg.	Reg.	Reg.	Reg.

== General community ==
Byron Robert Jones was a merchant at least from 1912. He was the inaugural postmaster 1914–1917.

Comprising about 20 guest rooms, his hotel was completed in May 1914 and a liquor licence application lodged for the Copper Tavern that August. The official opening was soon afterward. At the time, the settlement only had a few houses. The hotel was considered one of the finer establishments in Western Canada. The Chalcopyrite newspaper published from June to November that year.

In 1920, the contents of the Copper Tavern were auctioned. Under new management, the tavern may have operated into the late 1920s.

A general store with gas bar existed immediately southwest of the railway bridge on Skeena Crossing Rd (former highway) at least until the 1980s.

== Maps ==
- "Official motorist's guide of British Columbia". library.ubc.ca. 1931. p. 69 (Map 31).
- "Standard Oil BC map". www.davidrumsey.com. 1937.
- "Shell BC map". www.davidrumsey.com. 1956. Archived from the original on 2022-10-17.
