= Hazelton, British Columbia =

Village of Hazelton
- village municipality
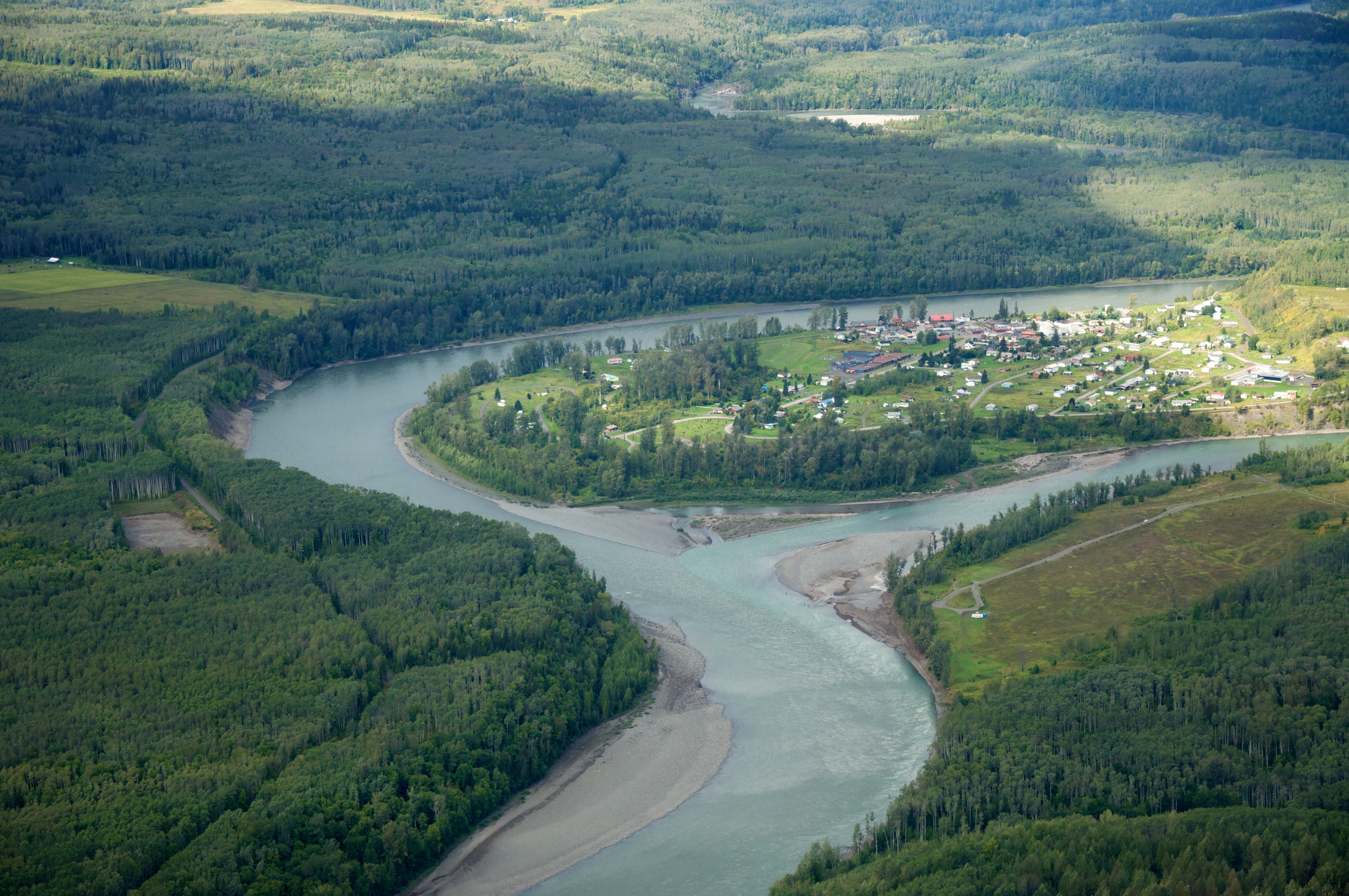
- Northwestward aerial view at the confluence, Hazelton, 2011.

- Location of Hazelton in British Columbia
- Coordinates: 55°15′20″N 127°40′31″W
- Country: Canada
- Province: British Columbia
- Region: Skeena
- Regional district: Kitimat–Stikine
- Incorporated: 1956

Government
  - Type: Municipal corporation
  - Mayor: Julie Maitland

Area
  - Total: 2.89 km^{2} (1.12 sq mi)
- Elevation: 305 m (1,001 ft)

Population (2021)
  - Total: 257
  - Density: 88.9/km^{2} (230/sq mi)
- Time zone: UTC−07:00 (PT)
- Area codes: 250, 778, 236, & 672
- Highways: Highway 62
- Waterways: Skeena River; Bulkley River
- Website: Official website

Hazelton is a village municipality in the Skeena region of west central British Columbia, Canada. The place is on the southeast side of the Skeena River immediately north of the Bulkley River mouth, where the confluence forms a peninsula. On BC Highway 62, the locality is by road about 75 kilometres (47 mi) northwest of Smithers and 144 kilometres (89 mi) northeast of Terrace. Hazelton is the original of the "Three Hazeltons", the other two being New Hazelton to the southeast and South Hazelton to the south.

== Geography ==
The two rivers flow through the broad forested glacial valleys. The Roche de Boule range forms the southern wall of the Skeena valley. To the north are the Skeena Mountains and to the northwest the Kispiox Range. Layered sandstone and shale lie beneath the Hazeltons area. About 25,000 years ago, the ice sheet was 2 kilometres (1.2 mi) thick. Over the past 11,000 years, the rivers have cut down through the thick moraine exposing the bedrock.

== First Nations and early European contacts ==
First Nations have inhabited the area for at least 7,000 years.

In the 1840s, Simon McGillivray, a Hudson's Bay Company (HBC) chief trader, led an expedition from Babine Lake to what would become Hazelton.

In 1865, a survey party for the Russian–American Telegraph ventured up the Skeena to this point and left supplies for the construction crew arriving the following year. In 1866, the telegraph line was extended from Quesnel via Fort Fraser and passed the future Hazelton that July, before terminating 40 kilometres (25 mi) farther north. In 1867, the line north of Quesnel was abandoned.

During 1866–1868, the HBC operated the Ackwilgate fur trading post immediately south across the Bulkley at Mission Point.

The abandoned telegraph trail provided access for prospectors. During the Omineca Gold Rush of 1870–1871, the Hazelton settlement became strategic. As many as 4,000 miners made it a base. After the goldrush ended, European residents dwindled to a handful.

In 1881, William Collison founded the Anglican mission at Hazelton among the Gitxsan. In July 1888, the militia was sent from Victoria to quell an indigenous uprising at Hazelton, following the killing of Kitwancool Jim. On being informed the tension had subsided, only special constables went upriver to investigate, while the militia camped near Port Essington. Weeks later, the militia returned to base.

The Anglican Church ran the federal government-funded Hazelton First Nations school 1889–1950.

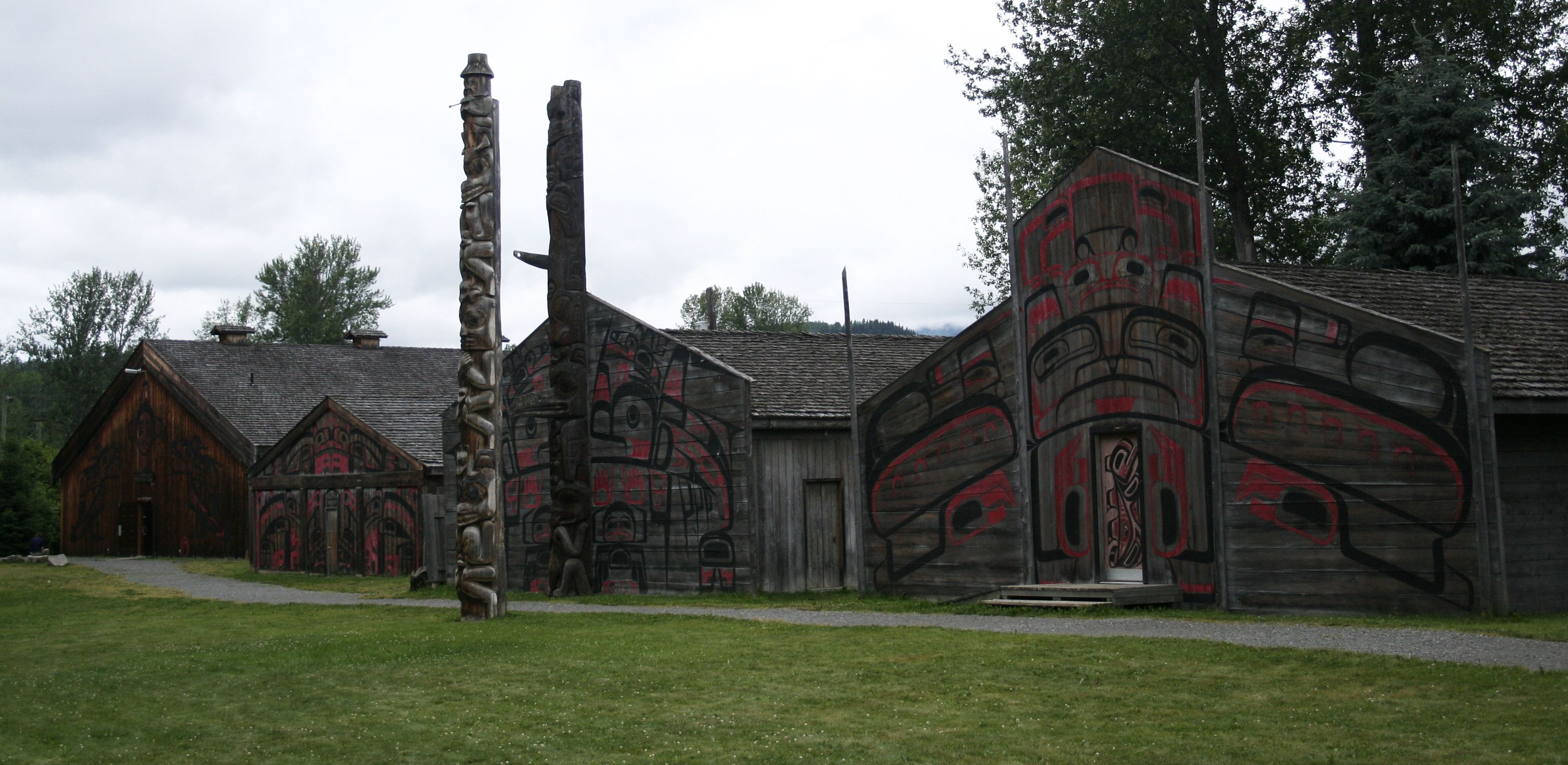
Ksan Historical Village, Hazelton, 2010.

In 1958, the original museum, called the House of Treasures was built in town to display indigenous artifacts. In 1968, the building was moved half a mile to the Ksan Historical Village, which was being developed as a combined campsite and village where area First Nations would produce, display, and sell, their arts and crafts. A special totem pole was carved and erected for the 1969 opening of the village. Items were carved on site from wood or animal horn and displayed for sale. By 1972, six houses stood in a line beside the original tiny museum, creating an authentically rebuilt indigenous village.

In 1994, the Wet'suwet'en Education Society broke into the vacant, former Hazelton High School building, intending to commandeer the premises for indigenous programs.

In 2012, a six-month blockade of the Gitxsan Treaty Society office ended peacefully.

The Ksan Historical Village and Museum has expanded into seven decorated tribal houses fronted with several carved totems. Carvers demonstrate their skills to visitors, and the Ksan Dancers, who perform local native dances, present scheduled performances.

== Name origin ==
The earliest newspaper reference to The Forks, the original name, was 1859, and to Hazelton, was 1872. Thomas Hankin, who staked the settlement in 1857, named it after the numerous hazelnut bushes in the vicinity. However, the former name remained predominant initially, before the two names became used together or interchangeably until the end of that century.

== Pre-railway ==
In 1870, the Cunningham & Hankin partnership, which would become R. Cunningham & Son, opened a branch store. By the early 1870s, a saloon and stores existed. By 1874, two stores remained, after one closed the prior winter.

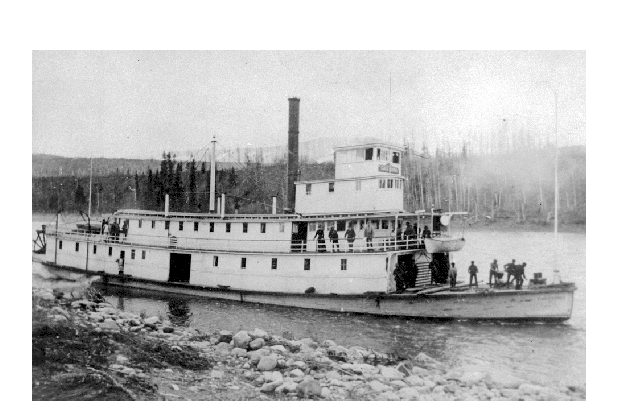
SS Caledonia, Hazelton, 1901.

In 1880, the HBC purchased the W.J. Walsh store. This warehouse became the place from which supplies were forwarded via the Hazelton–Babine portage and Fort Babine to other HBC posts. Charles William Digby Clifford was the resident HBC postmaster 1885–1887. By the late 1880s, a police officer was based in the community, and a jail was built at the time.

During 1890–1915, Hazelton was the largest community in northwest BC. At the head of navigation on the Skeena, the place was the centre of activity for prospectors, traders, merchants, packtrain operators, and missionaries.

In 1891, Richard S. Sargent arrived, becoming a leading figure in the community. That year, the HBC SS Caledonia was the first steamboat to navigate the Kitselas Canyon and reach Hazelton. However, both high and low water made the canyon impassable, limiting navigation to three months per year. Sargent was the inaugural government postmaster 1899–1927 and opened a trading post in 1900.

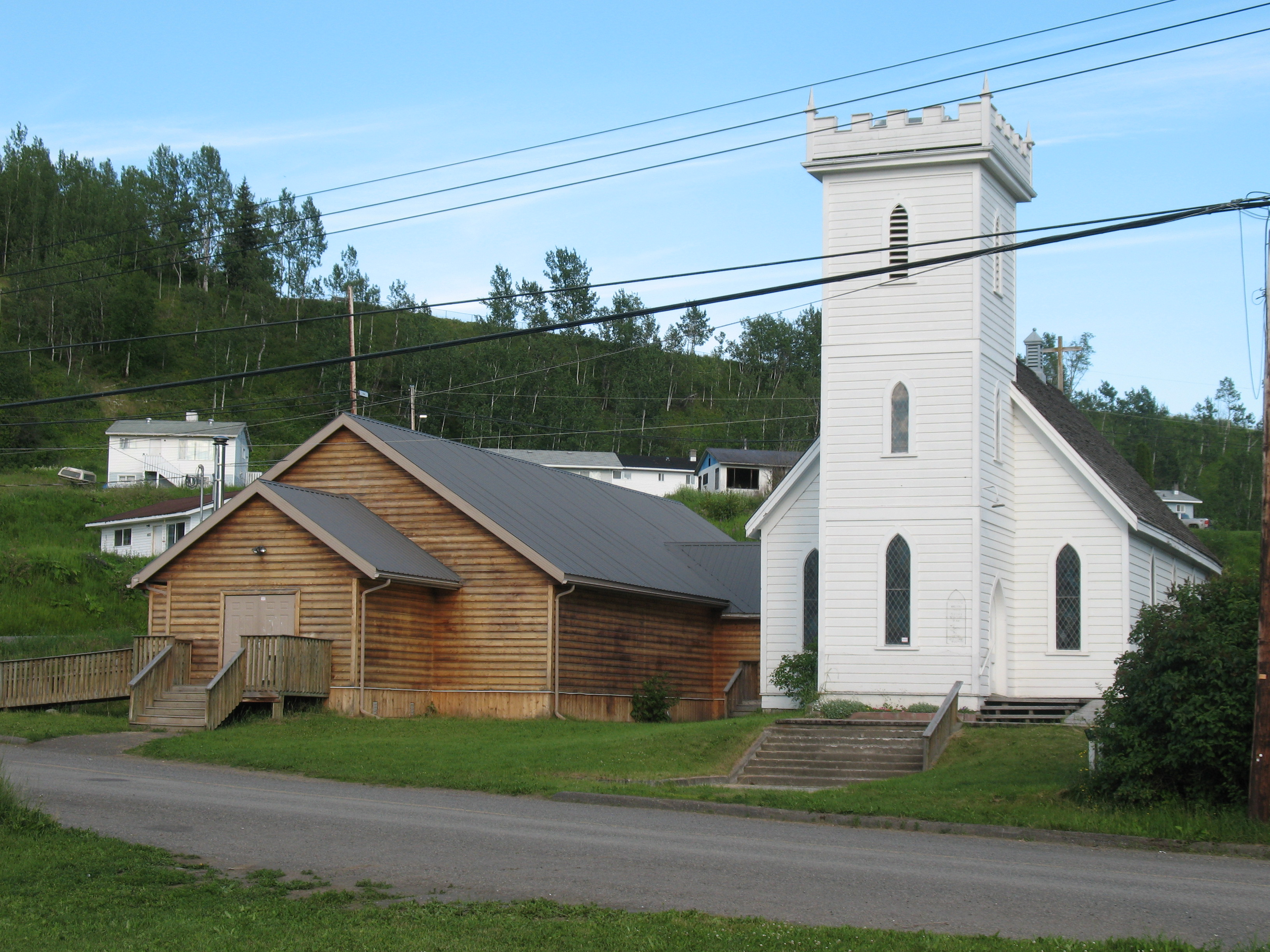
St Peter's Anglican church, Hazelton, 2009.

In 1900, St Peter's Anglican church was built. In 1901, the federal government telegraph service completed the Yukon Telegraph, which passed through Hazelton, linking Ashcroft with the Alaskan border In 1907, R.S. Sargent's store/post office burned to the ground. The expectation that the Grand Trunk Pacific Railway (GTP) would be built via Hazelton, led to an auction of lots in the vicinity and a revival of Hazelton. Since Hazelton proper was crammed onto 4 hectares (11 acres) surrounded by reserves, expansion was at Two Mile, also called the Hazelton City Addition.

In 1908, Joseph Leopold Coyle established the Omineca Herald newspaper. By this time, several stores and the Hazelton and Omineca hotels existed. The route southeastward to Aldermere (adjacent to Telkwa) was used by a weekly stage in summer and sleighs in winter. In February 1909, the Ingenica Hotel opened. That year, a new police district headquartered at Hazelton was created, the government offices moved from an old log shack into a new building, and a new jail replaced the dilapidated two-cell log shack.

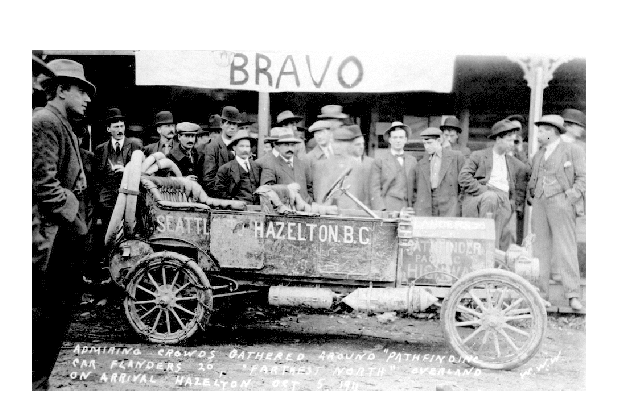
First car to reach Hazelton, 1911.

In 1910, fire consumed the Hazelton Hotel, a 42-bed bunkhouse was erected at the back of the Omineca Hotel, and the post office moved into an addition to the Sargent store. That year, a fire department was formed and two 230-litre; 60-US-gallon (50 imp gal) chemical engines ordered. The Union Bank opened a branch in temporary premises, and a community hall was built. By this time, a wagon road ran southwestward to Skeena Crossing.

The Pacific Highway Association offered a gold medal to the first car to travel from Seattle to Hazelton, which was the tentative terminus of an ambitious highway scheme. In October 1911, P.E. Sands and his mechanic completed the journey in a Flanders 20. Lacking a road north of Quesnel, they followed the old telegraph trail. For about 64 kilometres (40 mi) of this section, it was necessary to dismantle the vehicle for hauling with horses. This was the only gap not covered under motor power. The motorists were honored by a banquet before returning south by steamboat, train, and steamship. The awarded medal has been retained in Hazelton since 2013. The automobile is on display at the Kittitas County Historical Museum in Ellensburg, Washington.

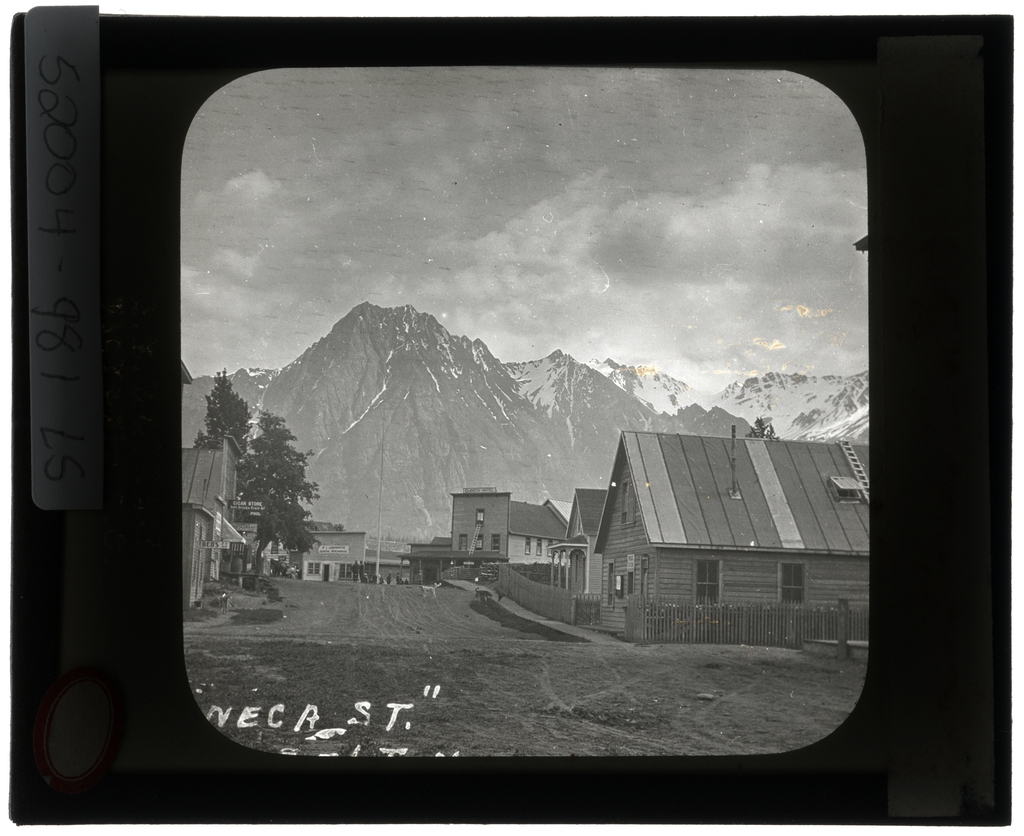
Omineca Street, Hazelton, c.1905.

In 1911, the rebuilt Hazelton Hotel opened with 32 guest rooms and a bunkhouse which accommodated another 30 people. Mid-year, the Bank of Vancouver opened a branch, initially using a tent, and the Inland Colonist relocated from Kitselas but publishing ceased that November. The Omineca Miner newspaper was launched that August.

In 1912, a series of suspicious stable fires occurred. Months later, fire destroyed the HBC and Broughton & McNeil warehouses. Further arson occurred a week later, when a fire at a vacant residence was extinguished before causing serious damage. For decades, residents had speculated every spring when the loud whistle of the first boat would be heard, even wagering large sums of money. The arrival would be welcomed with cheers to mark winter bleakness transitioning into new life. When the steamboat departed at the end of the 1912 season, this era drew to a close.

== Ferries and bridges ==
In 1910, a 56-metre (184 ft) suspension bridge across the Skeena opened 2.4 kilometres (1.5 mi) by road north of Hazelton.

During 1911 and 1912, a ferry linked Sealey and Hazelton. During 1912, steamboats connected the rail head at Skeena Crossing with Hazelton.

The Hazelton–South Hazelton ferry across the Bulkley operated from mid-1912 until replaced by a low level bridge in January 1917 at the same location.

In July 1914, towers were constructed for the Skeena ferry (a large scow to replace the canoe in use). Prior to the commencement of operations in August, a boat temporarily attached to the ferry cable capsized, and a youth on board drowned. By October, the service was fully operational.

In 1923–24, a new 9.1-tonne; 8.9-long-ton (10-short-ton) pontoon reaction ferry was installed.

To replace the Hagwilget high level bridge and the Hazelton low level bridge, the rebuilt 120-metre (400 ft) Hagwilget suspension bridge was officially opened in 1931. That year, the Skeena ferry was carried downstream to Ritchie. A few days later, it floated farther down and beached at Pacific. High water damaged the ferry in 1935. The towers, which were built in 1920, were reset in 1936. During the 1936 flood, the ferry house floated away, riverbank erosion washed out sections of road on both shores, and the ferry tower was twisted on the Hazelton side.

In 1953, the ferry was withdrawn.

== Post-railway arrival ==
In 1913, the Ingenica Hotel relocated to New Hazelton, but the HBC rebuilt its burned premises on the same site. Sidewalks were constructed on both sides of Main St. The number of resident automobiles increased to six, and the first vehicle travelling from the Mexico–United States border arrived.

In the battle between South Hazelton and New Hazelton to displace old Hazelton on the arrival of the railway, the former proved a non-starter and the latter remained much smaller than the old township after railway construction activity moved on. Old Hazelton remained the chief supply point for district.

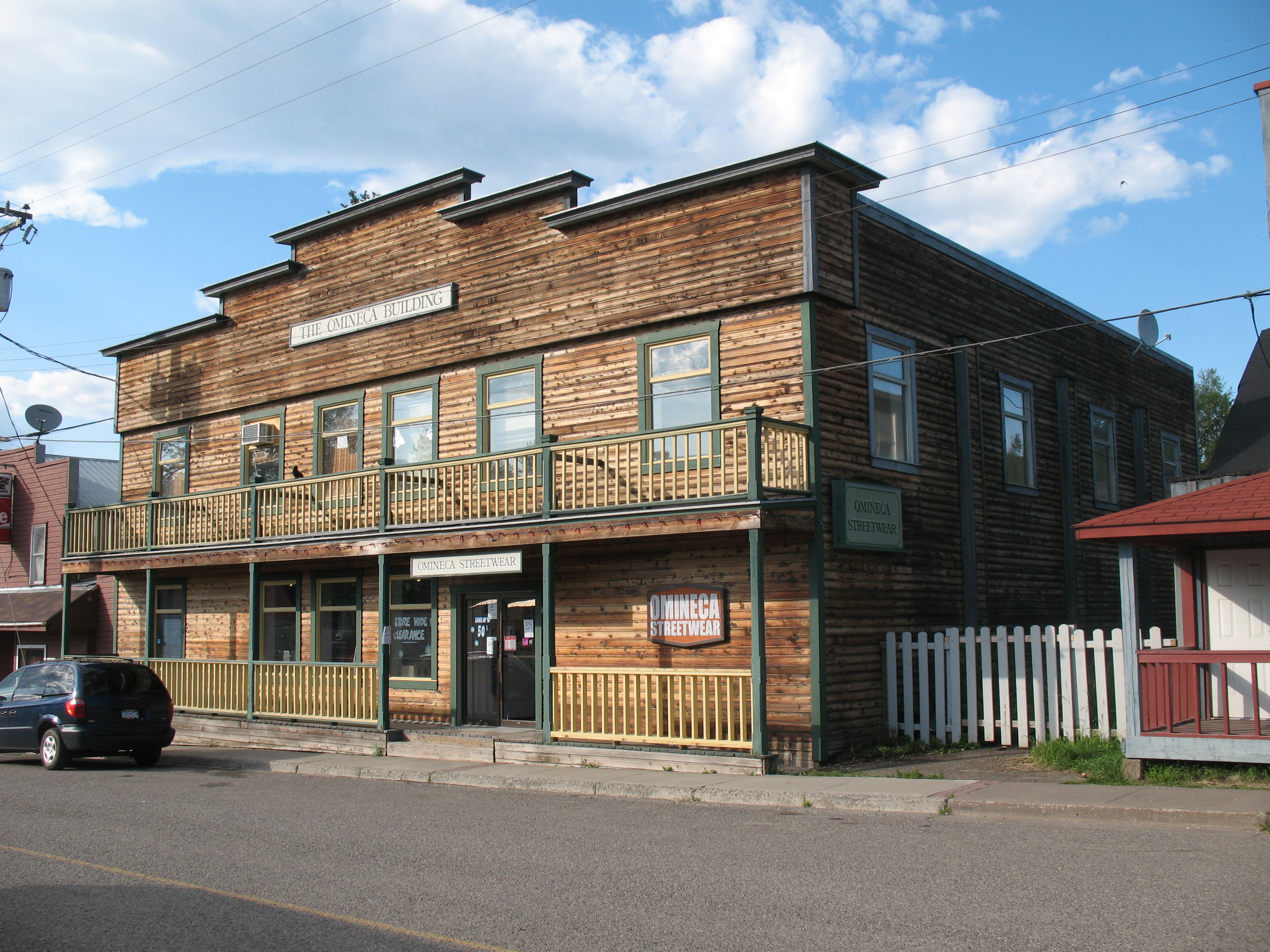
Omineca Building, Hazelton, 2009.

In 1914, when the C.V. Smith store/residence burned down, the structure was rebuilt. When the Bank of Vancouver branch closed, the Royal Bank opened in the vacated premises, before moving months later. When the Union Bank relocated to larger premises, the former ones were repurposed as a Methodist church, before the congregation moved to St Andrew's Hall. That year, the HBC store was enlarged.

In 1915, the Royal Bank closed and the Union Bank closed its New Hazelton sub-branch. C.V. Smith erected a new warehouse for his store. In 1917, fire levelled the Sam Lee store/laundry, the Omineca Herald moved to New Hazelton, Northern Telephone installed a new switchboard, and the provincial government offices moved to Smithers. In 1918, the Omineca Miner ceased publication.

On Christmas night, 1920, fire destroyed much of the central business district. This may have been the fire that burned down St Andrew's Hall. In January 1921, fire broke out in the former Ingenica Hotel. Sam Lee, who operated the Royal Café in the building, sustained fatal burns. Months later, the RCMP headquarters moved to Telkwa, leaving just one constable stationed at Hazelton. In 1922, Hazelton Methodist Church was built. That April, a guest burned to death, when fire completely destroyed the Hazelton Hotel and several other buildings. In May 1925, the Royal Bank absorbed the Union Bank, rebranding the latter local branch. In 1928, R.S. Sargent opened a hotel.

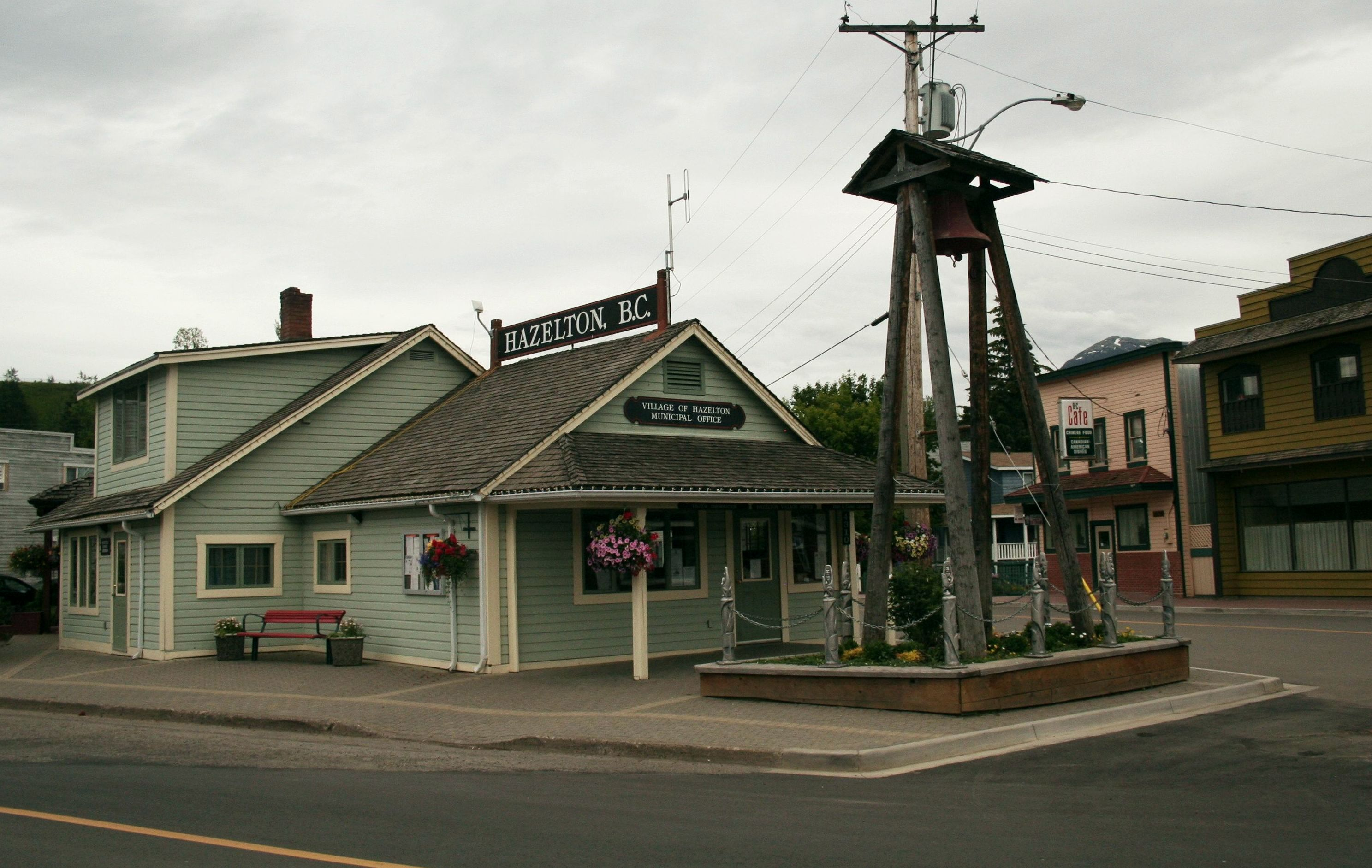
Municipal office, Hazelton, 2010.

In 1931, fire completely destroyed the Omineca Hotel and several other buildings. In 1932, the Royal Bank branch closed and the Sargent hotel and two warehouses burned down. In 1937, William John Sanders, a former Sergeant-at-arms in the BC Legislature died at his residence.

In 1947, Canadian Trailway Stages inaugurated a Hazelton–Prince George bus service, but the Hazelton–Vanderhoof leg was discontinued the next year. In 1948, the First Nations band surrendered 15 hectares (36 acres) of the reserve for sale to the public as lots in a subdivision, increasing the size of Hazelton from 4 hectares (11 acres). The present downtown covers about 8 hectares (20 acres) because not all lots sold.

In 1949, the BC Power Commission entered into an agreement to operate the hospital generator and purchased Kitanmax Water and Power Co, the local distributor which supplied 68 customers. The transmission lines were extended to South Hazelton and New Hazelton. The next year, the commission replaced the DC generator at the hospital with a larger AC one, which also became the plant for supplying existing Hazelton customers and new ones south of the Bulkley.

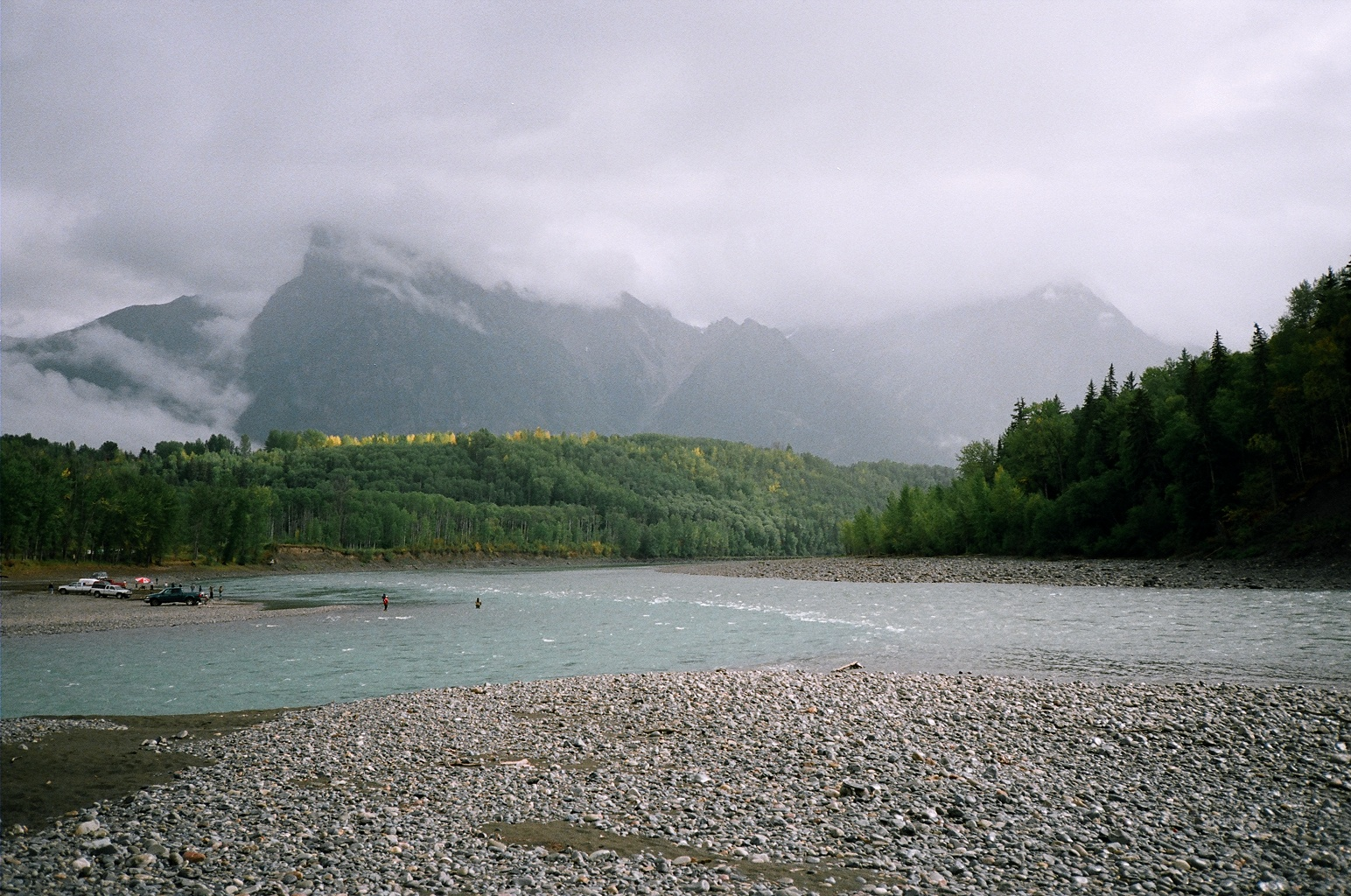
Southeastward view of Bulkley mouth (left), Hazelton, 2006.

By 1951, the RCMP had a two-person detachment. That year, a Royal Bank sub-branch opened. In February 1956, Hazelton was incorporated as a village. When the Inlander Hotel opened that year, the Royal Bank rented the lower level prior to building across the street. The Sargent family, the proprietors, had operated a smaller hotel in another building which had burned down shortly before. In 1959, the Royal Bank became a full branch and the New Hazelton one closed.

In 1963, BC Hydro increased the electricity supply capacity by installing a 600-kilowatt unit. During 1965–1972, the streets were first paved. In 1969, the current one-storey brick-veneer post office was built. Later that year, a dial telephone system replaced switchboard operators.

In 1972, a new lounge opened at the Inlander Hotel in what was once bank premises. The men's washroom was installed in the former vault. In July 1979, a homecoming weekend was held for former residents.

By the early 1980s, the RCMP had consolidated at New Hazelton.

In 1997, the Royal Bank moved to Hagwilget.

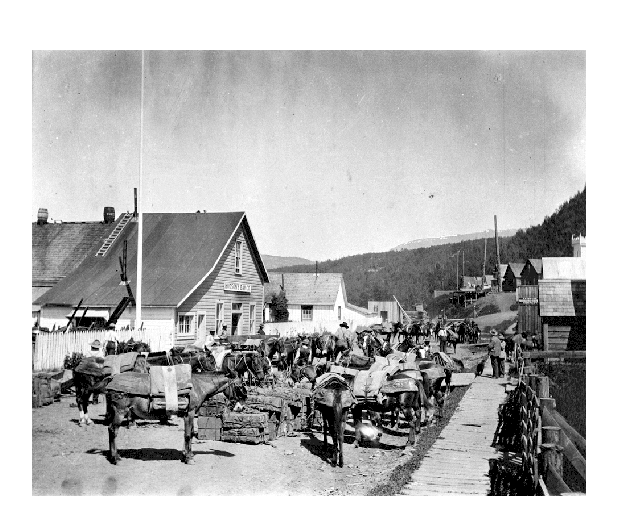
Cataline's Mule Train, Hazelton, 1911.

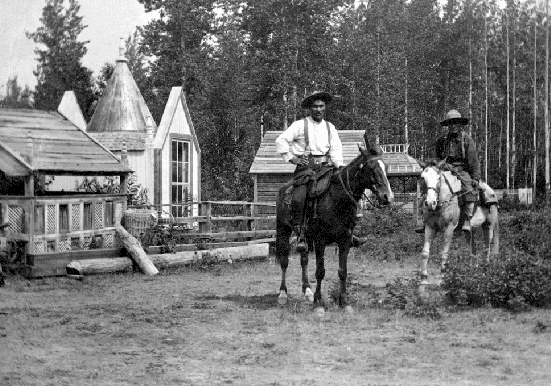
Simon Gunanoot (left), indigenous cemetery, Hazelton, 1920.

== Notable people ==
- Lyndsay Belisle (1977– ), Olympic wrestler, place of birth, and resident.
- Jean-Jacques Caux, aka Cataline, (c.1830–1922), pack train operator, resident, and place of death.
- Sperry Cline, (1881–1964), Boer War veteran, police officer, author, and resident.
- Constance Cox, (c.1881–1960), schoolteacher, interpreter, place of birth, and resident.
- Doug Donaldson, (1957– ), politician and resident.
- Dave Hancock, (1955– ), judge, politician, and childhood resident.
- Ron Homenuke (1952– ), ice hockey player, place of birth.
- Vicki Huntington, (19??– ), politician and resident.
- Carol Huynh (1980– ), Olympic wrestler, place of birth, and resident.
- Simon Peter Johnson, aka Simon Gunanoot, (1874–1933), merchant, fugitive, and resident.
- Alan Kerr (1964– ), ice hockey player, place of birth, and resident.
- Cathy McMorris Rodgers, (1969– ), politician and childhood resident.
- Roy Henry Vickers, (1946– ), indigenous artist, author, and resident.

== Later community ==
In 2003, fire seriously damaged the Inlander Hotel.

In 2017, BC Transit introduced a Terrace–Hazeltons bus service and remains the current passenger transit provider.

In 2023, construction began on a three-storey building near the hospital, which provides 31 new affordable rental units.

Census population: Hazelton
Year	Pop.	±%
1956	279	—
1961	410	+47.0%
1966	403	−1.7%
1971	351	−12.9%
1976	371	+5.7%
1981	393	+5.9%
1986	436	+10.9%
1991	339	−22.2%
1996	347	+2.4%
2001	345	−0.6%
2006	293	−15.1%
2011	270	−7.8%
2016	313	+15.9%
2021	257	−17.9%

A walking tour of the downtown area includes antique pioneer machinery displays, an original steam donkey, heritage sites, the Pioneer Museum, a riverboat replica, and the historic St. Peter's Anglican Church.

== Demographics ==
In the 2021 Census of Population conducted by Statistics Canada, Hazelton had a population of 257 living in 113 of its 125 total private dwellings, a change of −17.9% from its 2016 population of 313. With a land area of 2.89 km^{2} (1.12 sq mi), it had a population density of 88.9/km^{2} (230.3/sq mi) in 2021.

== Education ==
In 1906, the one-room school opened in a building provided rent free by the HBC.

In 1913, a new schoolhouse replaced the old building, which had become too small to accommodate the 23 enrolled students.

In 1926, the school raised to rural status, and in 1930, a second classroom was added.

In 1948–49, the status raised from Hazelton Superior to Hazelton Elementary-Senior High. At the time, the facility was described as a fine new modern school, with seven rooms and seven teachers.

In 1962–63, the Two Mile elementary school opened. In 1963–64, John Field Elementary opened at Hazelton. In 1965–66, Hazelton Elementary-Senior High became Hazelton Secondary.

In 1979, the two-room Two Mile school closed.

In March 1992, the new Hazelton Secondary construction replaced the former building.

In 2014, John Field Elementary was renamed Majagaleehl Gali Aks, which means "flowers of the rivers" in the Gitxsan language.

Part of School District 82 Coast Mountains, Majagaleehl Gali Aks stands on the descent to the downtown area, and Hazelton Secondary (to the northeast) has about 375 enrolled students. Adjacent to the secondary is a campus of the Coast Mountain College. Hazelton has traditionally been served by Nicola Valley Institute of Technology.

== Healthcare ==
In 1904, Dr. Horace Cooper Wrinch opened the first hospital, which developed a nursing school, gardens and dairy farm. Owned by the Methodist Church, funding came from the church, the province, Indian Affairs, and the public.

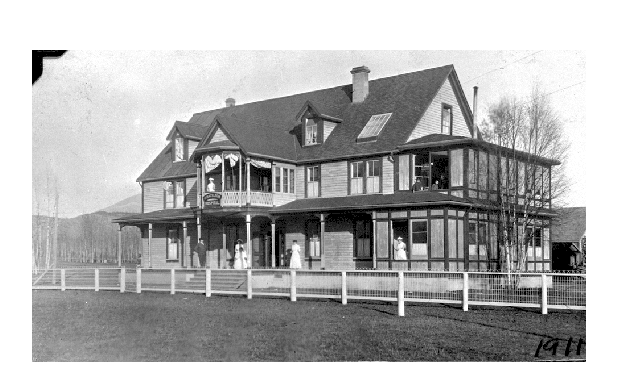
Hazelton Hospital, 1911.

About one mile east of Hazelton, the two-storey main building, included an attic and basement. The facility comprised five staff and 13 beds in 1904, seven staff and 17 beds in 1909, and 12 staff and 33 beds in 1911. The latter increase came from adding a new wing in 1910. Patient care was private, semi-private, and public. By that time, the 10 hectares (25 acres) of cleared land grew vegetables and livestock feed.

By 1912, 12 hectares (30 acres) of the 121-hectare (300-acre) grounds were cleared. The lake was 32 hectares (80 acres) and birch clumps formed a 3-hectare (7-acre) natural park. The main road passed through the property. In 1914, the hospital was wired for electricity.

When the second rebuild opened in 1930, the facility was renamed the Wrinch Memorial Hospital.

By 1972, the hospital was a 50-bed facility with plans to double the capacity. A single storey 4,300-square-metre (46,300 sq ft) structure adjacent to the existing building opened in 1977.

In 2002, the province reversed plans to downsize the hospital, retaining the nine acute care beds, the long-term beds, and the teaching role.

Part of Northern Health, the hospital provides acute, complex and community care, assisted living, and both shorter and longer term accommodation. The double occupancy rooms include 10 publicly subsidized long-term care beds. Outpatient care is supported. A BCAS station is based on the grounds.

== Climate ==
Hazelton has a humid continental climate (Köppen climate classification Dfb). Winters are cold but are milder than what the latitude may suggest, owing to Pacific air masses. The average temperature in January is −8.9 °C (16.0 °F) and from December to February, there are an average of 32 days where the maximum temperature reaches or surpasses freezing. However, Arctic air masses can push temperatures below −30.0 °C (−22.0 °F), occurring on average three days per year. The average annual snowfall is 185 cm (72.8 in). Summers are warm, with a July daytime high of 23.3 °C (73.9 °F) although night time temperatures are cool, with a July low of 9.1 °C (48.4 °F). In an average summer, there are seven days where the temperature exceeds 30 °C (86.0 °F). The average annual precipitation is 614 mm (24 in), with March and April being the driest months and October through January being the wetter months. The record high was 36.7 °C (98.1 °F) on August 20, 1977 and the record low was −40.5 °C (−40.9 °F) on January 8, 1991.

Climate data for Hazelton
Month	Jan	Feb	Mar	Apr	May	Jun	Jul	Aug	Sep	Oct	Nov	Dec	Year
Record high °C (°F)	8.9 (48.0)	11.0 (51.8)	17.0 (62.6)	26.7 (80.1)	32.5 (90.5)	34.5 (94.1)	36.0 (96.8)	36.7 (98.1)	32.2 (90.0)	21.5 (70.7)	12.5 (54.5)	8.0 (46.4)	36.7 (98.1)
Mean daily maximum °C (°F)	−4.7 (23.5)	0.2 (32.4)	7.1 (44.8)	13.1 (55.6)	17.9 (64.2)	21.1 (70.0)	23.6 (74.5)	23.0 (73.4)	17.2 (63.0)	9.5 (49.1)	0.6 (33.1)	−4.4 (24.1)	10.4 (50.6)
Daily mean °C (°F)	−8.1 (17.4)	−4.3 (24.3)	1.2 (34.2)	6.2 (43.2)	10.8 (51.4)	14.0 (57.2)	16.4 (61.5)	15.9 (60.6)	11.5 (52.7)	5.4 (41.7)	−2.0 (28.4)	−7.3 (18.9)	5.0 (41.0)
Mean daily minimum °C (°F)	−11.4 (11.5)	−8.8 (16.2)	−4.6 (23.7)	−0.8 (30.6)	3.5 (38.3)	6.8 (44.2)	9.3 (48.7)	8.8 (47.8)	5.7 (42.3)	1.3 (34.3)	−4.6 (23.7)	−10.2 (13.6)	−0.4 (31.2)
Record low °C (°F)	−40.5 (−40.9)	−35.0 (−31.0)	−30.0 (−22.0)	−11.1 (12.0)	−5.0 (23.0)	−1.1 (30.0)	0.0 (32.0)	−0.5 (31.1)	−4.0 (24.8)	−22.0 (−7.6)	−32.5 (−26.5)	−39.0 (−38.2)	−40.5 (−40.9)
Average precipitation mm (inches)	69.0 (2.72)	39.2 (1.54)	23.5 (0.93)	31.0 (1.22)	41.4 (1.63)	56.4 (2.22)	47.1 (1.85)	47.5 (1.87)	62.1 (2.44)	74.2 (2.92)	71.7 (2.82)	62.2 (2.45)	625.3 (24.61)
Average rainfall mm (inches)	12.8 (0.50)	13.4 (0.53)	13.6 (0.54)	28.6 (1.13)	41.4 (1.63)	56.4 (2.22)	47.1 (1.85)	47.5 (1.87)	62.1 (2.44)	70.8 (2.79)	31.9 (1.26)	10.0 (0.39)	435.6 (17.15)
Average snowfall cm (inches)	56.2 (22.1)	25.8 (10.2)	9.9 (3.9)	2.4 (0.9)	0 (0)	0 (0)	0 (0)	0 (0)	0 (0)	3.4 (1.3)	39.8 (15.7)	52.2 (20.6)	189.7 (74.7)
Average precipitation days (≥ 0.2 mm)	15.1	10.9	9.2	11.2	14.1	14.1	12.6	12.9	15.7	17.9	17.2	13.9	164.8
Average rainy days (≥ 0.2 mm)	4.2	5.1	6.7	11.1	14.1	14.1	12.6	12.9	15.7	17.4	8.7	3.3	125.9
Average snowy days (≥ 0.2 cm)	12.1	7.2	3.7	0.41	0	0	0	0	0	1.1	10.8	12.6	47.91
Source: Environment Canada1981-2010

== See also ==
- List of francophone communities in British Columbia
- List of Inland Ferries in British Columbia
