= Bulkley River =

River in Canada

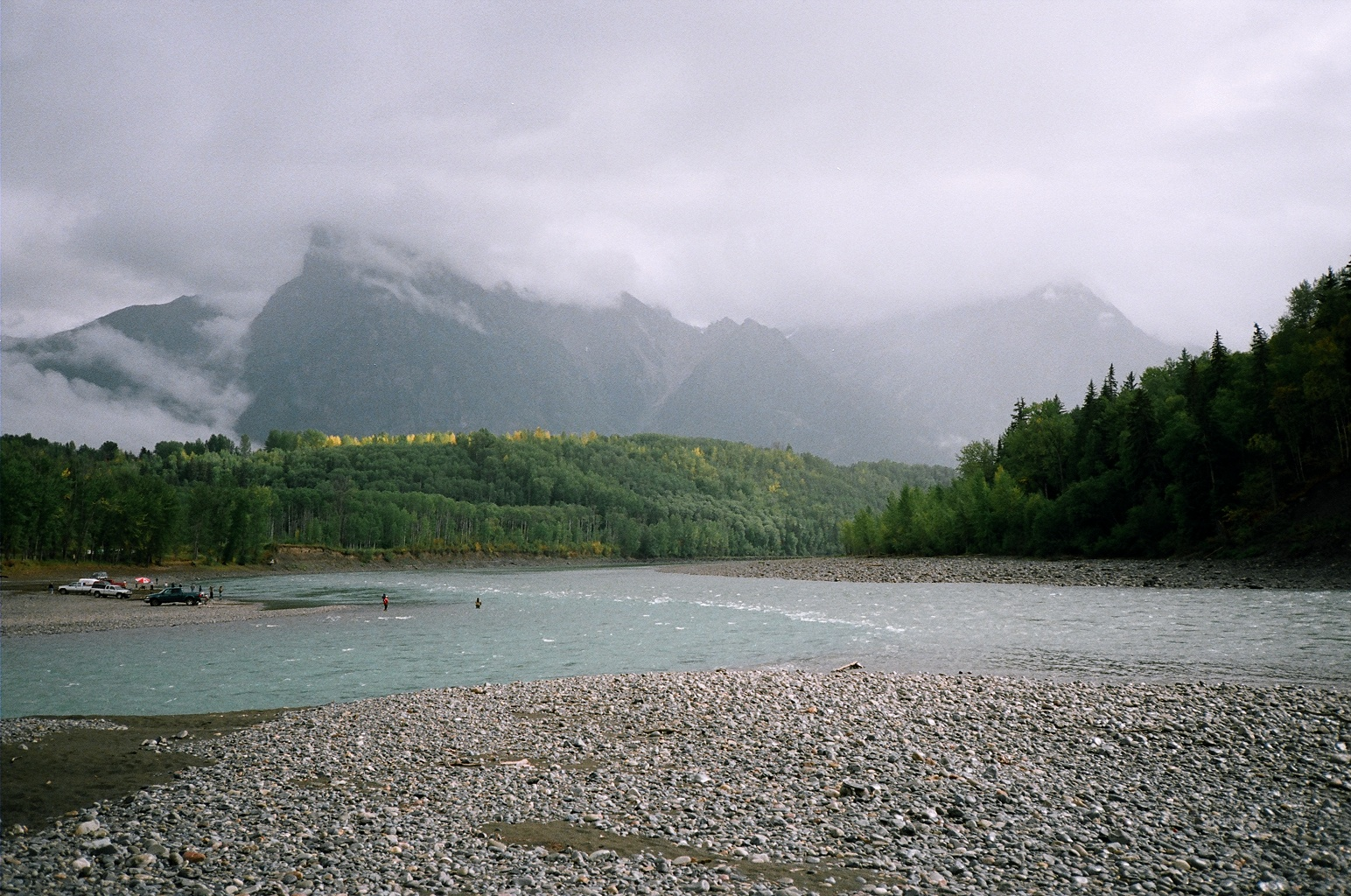
- The Bulkley River (left) flowing into the Skeena River (right) near Hazelton, British Columbia

- Location of mouths

Location
- Country: Canada
- Province: British Columbia
- District: Cassiar Land District

Physical characteristics
- Mouth
  - coordinates: 55°15′00″N 127°40′00″W
- Basin size: 12,400 square kilometres (4,800 mi^{2})

The Bulkley River in British Columbia is a major tributary of the Skeena River. The Bulkley is 257 kilometres (160 mi) long with a drainage basin covering 12,400 square kilometres (4,800 mi^{2}).

Much of the Bulkey is paralleled by Highway 16. It flows west from Bulkley Lake past Perow and is joined near Houston by the Morice River, its major tributary. The Bulkley continues north past Quick, Telkwa and Smithers. It then meets the Skeena River near Hazelton. The Bulkley River is a major tourist destination for anglers targeting wild steelhead.

The river was originally called Wet'sinkwha ("blue and green river") by the Wet'suwet'en people, the indigenous inhabitants of the Bulkley Valley. The name Bulkley was given for Colonel Charles Seymour Bulkley (1840-1894), the U.S. Army engineer-in-charge of the survey team who, in 1866, explored the area in preparation for the failed Russian American Telegraph. The project was abandoned because of the success of the trans-Atlantic cable in 1866.

The Little Bulkley, a smaller stream running through Houston, and the Morice join just west of Houston. At the point of their joining they become the Bulkley, not the Morice, although the Morice is larger. This was done by Poudrier, a government cartographer who, it is rumoured, never saw the region.

== See also ==
- List of rivers of British Columbia
- Bulkley Valley
