= Skeena Country =

Historic geographic region of British Columbia, Canada

- Historic geographic region
- Interactive map of Skeena Country
- Coordinates: 55°15′N 127°40′W
- Country: Canada
- Province: British Columbia
- Named for: Skeena River
- Major centres: Terrace, Kitimat, Prince Rupert (regional hubs)
- Time zone: UTC−8 (Pacific Time Zone (PST/PDT))
  - Summer (DST): UTC−7 (PDT)

The Skeena Country is a historic geographic region comprising areas of both the British Columbia Coast and the British Columbia Interior in northwestern British Columbia, Canada.

In 1997, the Gitxsan won title rights to their traditional lands in Delgamuukw v. British Columbia.

== See also ==
- Skeena Crossing
- Skeena Mountains
- Skeena River
- Skeena—Bulkley Valley, federal electoral district
- Skeena, former federal electoral district
