= Miworth, British Columbia =

Miworth
- Location of Miworth in British Columbia
- Coordinates: 53°56′59″N 122°56′05″W
- Country: Canada
- Province: British Columbia
- Region: Nechako
- Regional District: Fraser–Fort George
- Time zone: UTC−07:00 (PT)
- Area codes: 250, 778, 236, & 672

Miworth is an unincorporated community on the southeast shore of the Nechako River in the Nechako Region of central British Columbia. The location, via Otway Rd and Miworth Rd, is about 16 kilometres (10 mi) northwest of Prince George.

== Name origin ==
The Grand Trunk Pacific Railway (GTP) assigned the name at the time of track construction, likely from its prepared list. Many of these names (which were associated with England) had been submitted by Josiah Wedgwood at the request of William P. Hinton, the railway's general manager. Miworth seems to be one such example, but no such surname or place name has existed in the United Kingdom. However, the name may well have been a misspelling of Minworth.

== Railway ==
In spring 1913, a survey camp was based at Miworth. The westward advance of the GTP rail head passed through the area in late February 1914. On April 6, 1914, officials drove in the golden spike, completing the GTP transcontinental line (later part of the Canadian National Railway (CN)).

Dr. Donald McGibbon and George Ovasko, two property owners in the vicinity, sued the GTP over the unfair compensation given for expropriating parts of their properties. The arbitrator, generously awarded the two plaintiffs. However, after the GTP challenged the Ovasko award, legal costs consumed most of the final Ovasko settlement.

In 1953, sub-zero temperatures fractured tracks near Miworth, causing eight-car and 24-car derailments. Track clearing held up a westbound passenger train for 14 hours.

Trains wrecked vehicles on the railway crossing in 1958 and 1997. Fortunately no trains were present on those occasions when the school bus stalled on the crossing. During a BC Rail strike in 1976, CN transported highly dangerous chlorine to a temporary unloading facility at Miworth, where it was pumped into road tankers for delivery to the three Prince George pulp mills. When the process was repeated during a 1980 strike, a small chlorine spill at the unloading facility prompted a threat of picketing by the community, which then numbered about 200 residents.

In 1986, residents successfully opposed a plan by DuPont Canada to store hydrogen peroxide at a CN gravel pit on a siding 1 kilometre (0.6 mi) east of Miworth.

Train Timetables (Regular stop or Flag stop)
	Mile	1916	1920	1925	1932	1935	1942	1945	1950	1956	1960	1963	1967	1968
Nichol	28.0	Flag	Flag	Flag	Flag	Flag	Flag	Flag	Flag	Flag				
Bednesti	20.0		Flag	Flag	Flag	Regular	Regular	Flag	Flag	Flag	Flag	Flag	Flag	
McBride Timber	16.1											Flag		
Chilako	13.9	Flag	Flag	Flag	Flag	Flag	Flag	Flag	Flag	Flag	Flag	Flag	Flag	
Miworth	8.9	Flag	Flag	Flag	Flag	Flag	Flag	Flag	Flag	Flag				
Otway	5.2	Flag	Flag	Flag	Flag	Flag	Flag	Flag	Flag	Flag	Flag	Flag	Flag	
Prince George	0.0	Regular	Regular	Regular	Regular	Regular	Regular	Regular	Regular	Regular	Regular	Regular	Regular	Regular

== Ferry ==
In 1918, a free ferry was established which linked the train station and the First Nations reserve across the river. The No 3 Indian Reserve (now called Clesbaoneecheck No. 3) was initially the official name of the ferry. During this era, a wagon road continued beyond the northwest dock. The toll levied for Sunday service was 25 cents a person or 50 cents a horse team. The reaction ferry sank to the bottom of the river, when launched in spring 1926. During the following years, Miworth was the alternative official ferry name.

In 1941, the 5-ton reaction ferry was reconstructed. In 1945, Dominic Francis "Red" Killoren, who lived on the northwest shore and had been the operator for the past 11 years, collapsed and died while walking the quarter mile from the road to the southeast dock. In 1948, the ferry was discontinued.

Still visible are the remnants of the ferry pilings on the south side and ferry pontoons and tower on the north side.

== Forestry and mining ==
In the early 1920s, the Anderlang sawmill existed prior to relocation. A 1925 fire later destroyed lumber and ties which had yet to be moved. In 1928, Martin S. Caine's Foreman Lumber Co., formerly of Foreman, purchased the Larsen Timber Co.'s six timber limits near Miworth. Cranbrook Sawmills, which operated a mill on Cranbrook Hill Rd, logged on the northwest bank of the river opposite Miworth in the late 1920s, where a log boom was established. In 1931, Caine's logging crew were in the vicinity of Miworth extracting lumber for the pilings of a Prince George bridge being erected.

In 1935, Nechako Golds established a significant dredging operation. The company camp, located opposite Miworth, comprised two bunkhouses, a large dining room, and a kitchen. When a party accompanying Premier Pattullo visited the site, some crossed the river in a company boat. On the return crossing in darkness, the propeller snagged, stranding the 12 occupants on a gravel bar while repairs were made. Afterward, a local farmer, who hurried down the embankment, tipped the boat and drowned in the swift river. Having failed to extract paying gold from the gravel, operations ceased within months, and the company was liquidated.

== Community ==
In 1922, Dominic Nish had grandiose plans for a poultry farm of 20,000 birds, but the fulfilment is not evident. By 1925, a wagon road existed from Prince George to a mile beyond Miworth.

In the early 1920s, William (Bill) Hrechka would travel about 1.6 kilometres (1 mi) from his farm on the north side of the river to work at the Anderlang sawmill on the south side. Impressed by the black soil, he bought 20 hectares (50 acres) at Miworth, where the family relocated around 1925. The ferry was adjacent to their place. About 1930, Mary, one of the daughters, drowned in the river.

A 1926 forest fire fought by a crew of 50 reached close to the train station until heavy rain extinguished the blaze. The Hrechka family lost all their possessions, and former ferry operator John Burton lost his $3,000 rabbit-breeding farm. The Burton family relocated to Shelley, where John became the ferry operator.

Russell E. and Margaret M. Johnston farmed from 1946. The couple won awards in the Prince George fall fairs. In the late 1950s, top soil was being stolen regularly from the Shearer Estate farm.

By 1961, a school bus transported students to Central Fort George School. In 1967, the community association was reorganized. The next year, a subdivision development included river frontage lots.

In 1973, parents complained that the school bus runs were over overcrowded and dangerous. Although the bus was quite new, the rough roads caused numerous breakdowns, which sometimes left the children stranded in sub-zero temperatures. The parents believed the bus needed more regular inspections and the route over Cranbrook Hill, where the bus struggled, was hazardous. In response, the school board changed the route. In 1974, the widowed Bill Hrechka died, while still a Miworth resident. In the late 1970s, a subdivision development application comprised 57 lots, and a nine-lot subdivision did not want to incur the cost of paving, because the community already had 6 to 8 kilometres (4 to 5 mi) of unpaved road and existing paving was still miles from Miworth. However, the road to Miworth was paved in 1980, when an 8-kilometre (5 mi) section was upgraded.

By 1980, Wilkin's House on the southern perimeter of the Wilkins Regional Park served as the community hall. In 1987, when parents again objected to the school bus route which had reverted to the dangerous Cranbrook Hill, the school board took no action. In 1989, the RDFFG implemented house numbering.

In 1993, residents approved a RDFFG loan to finance the installation that year of natural gas mains, repayable over 10 years through property taxes. In 1995, the RDFFG established a small transfer station for household garbage disposal. In 1997, high water seriously eroded about six to eight properties, some losing metres of riverbank. Coupled with earlier ice jam damage, four to five homes needed relocation. In 1998, 8.3 kilometres (5.2 mi) of roads within Miworth were paved, two for the first time. In 1999, a referendum to form a volunteer fire department was defeated.

In 2009, an environmental assessment was made prior to constructing a 185-metre (607 ft) section of river bank protection using riprap. In 2010, a proposed 34-lot subdivision did not eventuate.

Parents protested when a courtesy school bus service, which operated 2008–2011 and connected with the out-of-catchment Heritage elementary, was withdrawn. The school board reinstated the service two months later. In 2011–12, the service was permanently withdrawn.

The present 63-lot subdivision maintains a community hall and skating rink. A 2022 referendum to upgrade these facilities appears to have been defeated. Miworth is a bedroom community for Prince George.

== Sport and recreation ==
In 1947, the Prince George Rod and Gun Club built a trout hatchery at Miworth for replenishing several local lakes. The hatchery operated at least until 1953 when one at Cluculz Lake opened.

The junior section of the annual Northern Hardware canoe race, covering Miworth–Prince George, commenced in 1971. The longer senior section course started at Isle Pierre. In 1978, the community was divided over whether to develop a 0.8-hectare (2-acre) park. After a majority voted in favour, a development plan was approved which included a skating rink and playground.

In 1981, Miworth was the extreme point for a triathlon. The Northwest Brigade Canoe Club collected garbage downriver from Miworth as part of BC Rivers Day in 1982 and 1983. The 1983 annual Northern canoe race merged to a common Miworth starting point. and the event lasted into the early 1990s. During the 1986–87 winter, a snow carnival was held.

The Miworth Equestrian Centre (formerly the Nechako Valley Equestrian Centre) has existed since the early 1990s.

The Via Rail Santa Train between Miworth and Prince George, began in 1996 and continued as late as 2003. That year, a 8.5-kilometre (5.3 mi) road race event from Miworth was held.

The annual Miworth–Prince George float, using any flotation device, began in 2011 and was held at least until 2014.

The annual Northern Hardware canoe race was revived in 2015 as an Isle Pierre–Prince George race, while the junior section (Simon Fraser Class) started from Miworth.

== Wilkins Regional Park ==
The park occupies the former Allan and Olga Stevens farm. Although created by 1978, the facility did not open to the public until 1981.

Additions included a new footbridge in 1987 and concrete boat ramp in 1988. In 1989, all-night parties and extensive vandalism occurred.

The 57-hectare (141-acre) park has 800 metres (875 yd) of river shoreline with parking, picnic facilities and nature trails. Infrastructure includes a picnic shelter with a wood burning stove, toilets, picnic tables, and fire pits.

== Accidents and incidents ==
1920: A rowboat overturned in the river, drowning a settler. A body discovered the following spring downriver at Prince George was possibly the victim.

1928: The decomposed body of a lumberjack was found slumped in the vicinity.

1929: A deranged man, living 5 kilometres (3 mi) to the west, attacked two police officers with an axe while armed with a revolver.

1978: An epileptic seizure likely caused a woman to fall to her death down a 23-metre (75 ft) embankment.

1982: Alcohol was a prominent factor in the drowning of a woman who disappeared while fishing with her husband on the river bank near Miworth. The badly decomposed body was found 10 days later in the Fraser River near Lillooet.

1983: A man fatally shot his wife and a man with whom he shared a house. The next year, the perpetrator was found guilty of two counts of second-degree murder and received two concurrent life sentences. In 1986, the verdict stood after a new trial was ordered.

2000: A man who bound his stepson, left him to die, transported the body from Prince George, and buried him in a shallow grave in a wooded area south of Miworth, was sentenced to five years in prison in 2013.

2001: Three residences were evacuated after fire engulfed four vehicles and nearby propane tanks.

2019: The remains of a man found in the Miworth area indicated a suspicious death.

== Otway Nordic Ski Centre ==
About 5 kilometres (3 mi) to the northeast, organized cross-country skiing on the Otway trails was popular by the early 1970s. The ski centre opened for the 1984–85 season, offering about 4 kilometres (2 mi) of trails (1.5 kilometres (0.9 mi) lit for night skiing), a two-storey cabin, and a biathlon range. The leased area grew from 8.2 hectares (20.3 acres) in 1985 to 312 hectares (771 acres) in 2019. Operated by the Caledonia Nordic Ski Club, the venture comprises 55 kilometres (34 mi) of groomed trails (10 kilometres (6 mi) lit), 10 kilometres (6 mi) of dog friendly trails, numerous snowshoe trails, a 30-lane biathlon range, cross-country ski trails, and a stadium complex.

== Maps ==
- "Official motorist's guide of British Columbia". library.ubc.ca. 1931. p. 68 (29).
- "Shell BC map". www.davidrumsey.com. 1956.

== See also ==
- List of Inland Ferries in British Columbia
