= Disappearance of Helen Claire Frost =

Missing person, British Columbia, Canada

Helen Claire Frost
- Helen Claire Frost
- Born: October 17, 1952; Reigate, England, UK
- Disappeared: October 13, 1970 (aged 17); Prince George, British Columbia, Canada
- Status: Missing for 56 years and 21 days
- Other names: Lana Lunn, Debbie Soles
- Occupations: Table busser, berry picker, painter, labourer
- Height: 5 ft 6 in (168 cm)
- Parents: Dennis Roy Frost (father); Daphne Joan Frost (mother)

Helen Claire Frost, then 17 years old, went missing on October 13, 1970, after telling her sister Sandy that she was going for a walk. She had recently broken up with her boyfriend, and had given up her firstborn child for adoption earlier that year. Frost left her apartment on the 1600 block of Queensway in Prince George, British Columbia and has not been seen since.

== Background ==
Helen Frost was born in Reigate, England, on October 17, 1952, to parents Dennis and Daphne Frost. She had an older sister named Sandy. Her father was a green beret in the British Commando Brigade for 12 years, and worked on the docks in London during World War II. In 1956, the family moved to Nanaimo, British Columbia, Canada. After the move, Dennis worked for the city of Nanaimo as a sweeper operator. Frost's family was stable and her mother and father were married for 67 years, until Dennis died on July 20, 2014. Sandy described them as "good parents despite the head-strong actions of their two rebellious teenage girls."

Frost moved to Prince George, British Columbia in 1969, and Sandy joined her in November of that year. They shared an apartment on the 1600 block of Queensway, along with a woman named Darlene and her infant child. In the spring of 1970, Frost went to a home for unwed mothers in Kamloops where she gave birth to a daughter, Sandra Jeanette, on May 13 of that year. Shortly afterward, she returned to Prince George and her baby was taken into government custody. She unsuccessfully tried to regain custody of the baby in the summer of 1970. Sandy recalled that Frost came out of the social worker's office, "just bawling her eyes out, and we never talked about it again." Sometime between the birth of her child and her disappearance, Frost's relationship with the father of the child, Stefan Grumpner, dissolved.

Frost worked a number of odd jobs while she was in Prince George, including a busser at the Hudson's Bay Company cafeteria, and a gas station painter for a company that operated between Prince George and Prince Rupert.

=== Relationship status ===
Frost was single at the time of her disappearance. She had given birth to her daughter, Sandra Jeanette, on May 13, 1970, in Kamloops and moved to Prince George shortly afterwards. The father of this child was identified as Stefan Grumpner, who left Frost shortly after the birth. It is not public knowledge when Stefan and Frost separated. The police interviewed Stefan after Frost's disappearance and reported that they did not find anything suspicious.

=== Identifying characteristics ===
Frost was a Caucasian female with blue eyes and brown-blonde hair. She stood about 5 feet 5 inches and weighed about 125 pounds. Since birth, Frost's right eye drooped, appearing slightly closed as compared to her left eye. She had given birth six months prior to her disappearance.

=== Personal items at time of disappearance ===
When she disappeared, Frost was wearing a three-quarter length, navy-blue nylon coat with a fake fur-trimmed hood and blue pants. Sandy reported that Frost left behind money, clothes, and identification at their apartment.

== Disappearance ==
17-year-old Frost was last seen on October 13, 1970, on the 1600 block of Queensway, Prince George where she shared an apartment with her sister Sandy, along with a woman named Darlene and her infant child. Sandy reported that she came home at about 8:00 pm after coffee with a friend, and met Frost. Frost asked Sandy if she wanted to go for a walk but Sandy declined because it was too cold. Frost said she would go out for a quick walk by herself, left at about 8:20 pm, and never returned home.

Frost was not immediately reported missing because Sandy thought that she might be over at a friend's house. When she didn't return by Thursday, October 15, two days later, Sandy reported her disappearance to the Royal Canadian Mounted Police (RCMP).

== Investigation ==
Frost was reported missing by her sister Sandy on October 15, 1970. Sandy said that the RCMP took a missing person's report, but she got the impression that nothing was done. Sandy lamented that she was too young and inexperienced at the time to push for more action from the RCMP. There was a tip that Frost had hitchhiked from the Husky gas station in Prince George. Although the RCMP investigated this tip, they could not substantiate it.

There is no statute of limitations on serious crimes in Canada, and Frost's case is still active. There have been a number of officers assigned to the case since 1970, with the most recent having been assigned in 2017 (file 1970-70118).

== Search effort ==
Sandy and a friend conducted an independent search for Frost. Sandy's friend determined that a truck driver saw Frost hitchhiking from the Husky gas station in Prince George, but the RCMP were unable to verify this tip.

Sandy has been the main driving force behind the search for Frost, with the assistance of some friends. In 2018, Frost's daughter, Sandra Jeannette Frost, now named Michele Johnston, reached out to Sandy after searching for her birth mother. Michele and Sandy were reunited later on that year.

== Awareness effort ==
The awareness effort for Frost's disappearance includes missing person posters, news articles, and a Facebook page dedicated to her disappearance. Sandy pushed to get Helen's name added to the E-Pana list of victims in the hopes of raising more awareness for Frost's disappearance. However, the RCMP declined the request since the case did not meet the criteria for inclusion. There are many cases like Frost's that meet what the RCMP reports as the criteria for inclusion; however, there have been no more victims added to the E-Pana list since it reached a total of 18 in 2007.

In 2009, Sandy reported that her father told her "I really hope I know what happened before I die." Dennis died on July 20, 2014.

== Theories ==
Three main theories exist as to how Frost disappeared, including: accident, runaway, suicide.

=== Accident ===
There is no evidence that she did or did not have an accident that caused her to lose contact with her friends and relatives. No remains were ever found and identified as Frost's, no sign of an accident has ever been indicated to the public, nor is it public knowledge if any witnesses have come forward to report an accident. There is no public evidence indicating that she ever had an accident.

=== Runaway ===
Frost was known to have run away in the past. However, Sandy said that there were indications that this was not the case because Frost had left behind money, clothes, and identification at the apartment, which they shared.

=== Suicide ===
Frost was going through a number of difficult challenges around the time of her disappearance. She had experienced giving up a child, the end of a romantic relationship, and a taxing living situation, living with a newborn child after having to give up her own baby. Because of these circumstances, it is plausible that she was under a great deal of stress. However, Sandy stated publicly that there was no evidence that Frost took her own life, and there was no suicide note left behind.

==== Friends or associates ====
It is not public knowledge whether or not Frost met with a friend or associate after she left her apartment in Prince George. Sandy thought that Frost may have been at a friend's house, but called RCMP to report Frost missing after determining that this was not the case. RCMP questioned her ex-boyfriend, Stefan Grumpner, and reported that they did not find anything about him to be suspicious. The names of associates and friends who were questioned is not public knowledge. However, Sandy and a friend discovered a tip indicating that Frost hitchhiked with a trucker. The RCMP were not able to confirm this. It is not public knowledge whether Frost met with a stranger or not after she left her apartment.

==== Highway of Tears ====
Chronologically, Frost is the first woman to have gone missing along the Highway of Tears corridor. To raise awareness, Frost's family wanted her to be added to the RCMP E-Pana list of victims; however, this request was denied by the RCMP, stating that she didn't meet the criteria for a victim on this list. There would not be another missing or murdered woman's case along the Highway of Tears until Ginny Sampare in 1971 and then Monica Ignas in 1974. Sampare went missing from Gitsegukla, while Ignas went missing from Thornhill, British Columbia, where her remains were found.

== See also ==
- List of people who disappeared mysteriously: 1910–1990
