= Edward Dennis Isaac =

Canadian serial killer (born 1958/59)

- Born: 1958 or 1959 (age 67–68)
- Convictions: Second degree murder Manslaughter (2 counts)
- Penalty: 3 life sentences with the possibility of parole after 15 years

Details
- Victims: 3
- Span of crimes: 1981–1982
- Country: Canada
- State: British Columbia
- Location: Highway of Tears
- Target: Females
- Date apprehended: February 7, 1986

Edward Dennis Isaac (born 1958 or 1959) is a Canadian serial killer who killed one woman and two teenage girls in the Canadian city of Prince George, British Columbia, between 1981 and 1982. In 1986, he was arrested after his girlfriend, who had knowledge of his involvement in one of the murders, told the police. He pleaded guilty to every killing, and was sentenced to three life terms with the possibility of parole after 15 years.

Isaac was active along the Highway of Tears, a corridor of Highway 16 infamous for being the location of many missing and murdered indigenous women. He is one of three convicted serial killers to have been active in the area, the others being Brian Peter Arp and Cody Legebokoff.

== Murders ==
On October 10, 1981, Isaac murdered 36-year-old Jean Mary Kovacs. At about midnight, Kovacs had been evicted from a bar in Prince George after drinking for several hours. After consuming more alcohol at home, she took a taxi to a highway intersection outside the city, and told the driver she planned to hitch a ride to Jasper or Edmonton. She was armed with a knife, and her blood alcohol level was .165. Later that day, Isaac shot her four times with a .22-caliber firearm and mutilated her body with a knife. He then dumped her corpse in a water ditch near a logging road in Purden Lake, approximately 40 kilometers from Prince George. The following day, her body was discovered by a man gathering firewood. Over the next month, 12,000 people were questioned about her murder, and 1,000 people were interviewed, 300 of whom were suspects. Thousands more were interviewed in the months following, but no arrests were made.

In the early morning hours of November 14, 1981, Roswitha Fuchsbichler, 13, left a house party in the foothills area of Prince George to meet an older man. She called the man earlier that night and they arranged to meet at a gas station. When he did not show up, she got a ride from two men to his apartment. At some point, she left the man's residence and planned to hitchhike. She was picked up by Isaac, who strangled her, and fatally stabbed her once in the heart to "see what it felt like." He proceeded to disrobe her body and sexually-mutilate her body before dumping her in a wooded area behind the Hart Highway, about 20 kilometers from where the party was held. She was reported missing on the same day at 6:45 p.m., and two joggers stumbled upon her body a week later. Due to the similar modus operandi, investigators immediately suspected her murder was connected to Kovacs', but they had no physical evidence to prove it.

On August 16, 1982, Isaac murdered Nina Marie Joseph, a 15-year-old teenage girl. Evidence suggested that the two engaged in sexual activity, and he strangled her with the cord of her jacket after she refused to perform a certain sex act. Afterwards, he removed her clothing before stabbing and slashing her body with a knife. To get rid of the corpse, he enlisted the help of his then girlfriend. The two moved Joseph's body to Freeman Park, where Isaac posed her spreadeagle and tied her legs to two trees. Isaac then threatened his girlfriend with a similar fate if she reported him to the police.

== Arrest and prosecution ==
In late 1985, Isaac's former girlfriend moved away from Prince George. Since she no longer felt threatened, she confessed to what happened to the police, and Isaac was arrested on February 7, 1986. Initially, he was only charged with Joseph's killing, which he pleaded guilty to the same year. In August 1986, he was charged with Fuchsbichler's killing. The following year, he pleaded guilty to manslaughter after a psychiatrist found him fit to stand trial. He was subsequently charged with Kovacs' murder. At a preliminary hearing, witnesses testified that Isaac told them that he and his brother, Jim, took Kovacs to a secluded road, where they raped her, shot her, and mutilated her. Jim could not be charged in Kovacs' murder because he had been murdered a few years prior. Isaac pleaded guilty to second degree murder in relation to Kovacs' death. Ultimately, he was sentenced to three life terms with the possibility of parole after 15 years. As of 1989, he is imprisoned at the Kent Maximum Security Prison.

== See also ==
- List of serial killers by country
- Violence against women in Canada
- Cold North Killers: Canadian Serial Murder
