= Highway of Tears (film) =

- Directed by: Matt Smiley
- Written by: Matt Smiley
- Produced by: Carly Pope
- Narrated by: Nathan Fillion
- Edited by: Brandon Lott
- Music by: Bekon
- Release date: March 6, 2015
- Running time: 79 minutes
- Country: Canada
- Language: English

Highway of Tears is a 2015 Canadian documentary film directed by Matt Smiley and narrated by Nathan Fillion. The film concerns the notorious Highway of Tears cases on British Columbia Highway 16 from 1969 to the present.

== Subject ==
The Highway of Tears case consists of numerous unsolved murders and disappearances of women on Highway 16, with a majority of the victims being Aboriginal.

The documentary explores the possible effects of systemic racism on the investigation, beginning with the Canadian Indian residential school system and including the popularity of the song "Squaws Along the Yukon" by Hank Thompson in the 1950s. The film covers the Robert Pickton murders and examines the possible roles killers Bobby Jack Fowler and Cody Legebokoff played in the Highway of Tears. It also references an earlier 2006 documentary Finding Dawn. The film ends with a note that then-Prime Minister Stephen Harper did not support an inquiry into Missing and Murdered Indigenous Women in Canada.

== Production ==
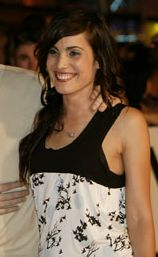
Producer Carly Pope stated the film was meant to call for an end to ignorance of the murders.

Matt Smiley, an artist and filmmaker, conceived of the documentary after touring Prince George, which he felt had an ideal landscape to make a film. While he was there, his brother-in-law mentioned the case of Nicole Hoar, who went missing on Highway 16. Smiley subsequently carried out interviews with community leaders and victims' families before taking his film crew to northern British Columbia to shoot the film. He credited Barb Ward-Burkitt, the executive director of the Prince George Native Friendship Centre, with supporting the project and being among the first to share her story.

Smiley's purpose in screening the film was to advance efforts to calling a national inquiry. Producer Carly Pope stated, "I believe the central message we're hoping to convey is that this is something occurring in our backyards that we can no longer remain ignorant to." The film received funding from Carrier Sekani Family Services, with Mary Teegee, its director of child and family services, credited as an executive producer.

== Release and reception ==
Highway of Tears debuted at the Human Rights Watch Film Festival in spring 2014, with the Toronto International Film Festival calling it a "hard-hitting documentary". Neil Godbout, writing for the Times Colonist, calls it "a beautiful and tragic film, showcasing strength and perseverance, as well as grief and loss".

The film won the Best Documentary award at the Malibu Film Festival in December 2014. It received another award for best documentary from the Women in Film + Television Festival in Vancouver.
