= Nexopia =

Canadian social networking website

- The logo of Nexopia

- Screenshot
- Company type: Joint venture, corporation
- Website type: Social networking, online forums
- Available in: English
- Founded: February 2003; 23 years ago Edmonton, Alberta
- Headquarters: Edmonton, Alberta; Toronto, Ontario
- Area served: Western Canada Main (2003–2012); Worldwide (2012–present)
- Owner: Ideon Media
- Founder: Timo Ewalds
- CEO: Kevin Bartus
- Key people: Dave Stevens, Boris Wertz
- Employees: 10 as of 14 November 2008
- Parent: Ideon Media
- Website: forums.nexopia.com (defunct)
- Registration: Required
- Users: 1.4 million users 200,000 active as of 9 November 2012
- Launched: February 2003; 23 years ago
- Current status: Closed

Nexopia was a Canadian social networking website created in 2003, by Timo Ewalds. It was designed for ages 14 and up, but was later lowered to 13. Users were able to create and design profiles, a friends list, blogs, galleries, and compose articles and forums. Interaction was accomplished through an internal personal messaging system, public user comments on profiles, blogs or through threads and posts on the forums. In November 2012, Nexopia was acquired by digital ad network Ideon Media.

== History ==
Nexopia was founded in 2003, and became Canada's first online social network, albeit mostly serving Western Canada. It evolved from the community site called Enternexus.com, another website built by Ewalds. The initial beta site was limited to 70 members and eventually led to Nexopia.com. When Enternexus.com relaunched as Nexopia.com, initial growth was said to be 100 users in four days, and 225,000 users within 22 months. For a brief period during that time, Nexopia.com maintained growth of 10% or 3500 average new members per day. In 2008, Nexopia announced 1.2 million active registered users and 1 billion page views per month as well as the investment of an undisclosed amount of the venture capital fund Burda Digital Ventures (now Acton Capital Partners).

In October 2010, the site had just under 1.5 million users and nearly 35 billion hits. In January 2012, the site reported 1,636,990 users and 35,517,895,992 hits.

The website uses Interac Online, a service that allows account holders at participating banks to make payments through online banking.

=== Profile update ===
In 2008, Nexopia updated its user profile pages, the largest revision since the site's launch in 2003. The redesign included a streamlined layout, Ajax controls for messages, galleries and profile editing, new profile skinning options and image resizing. The update caused controversy among users due to issues such as slow load times, disappearing profile pictures, undelivered private messages, forms not working correctly, and people upset because the site design was different. Nexopia staff polled users, and found that the majority disliked the new profile picture slider the most. Nexopia staff then provided the option to switch between the classic and new profile picture viewers.

=== Forums ===
The forums were the main social aspect of the website. Nexopia 'Plus' subscribers could create their own forums, which could be open or available only to only invited members. In early 2016, the website changed to online forums. The forum used software from XenForo, replacing WordPress.

== Members ==
Over 95% of users were Canadian, with over 1.4 million member accounts and a hit count of over 33 billion.

No content containing nudity, racism, violence, or gore was allowed on forums or profiles, although photos of a small amount of marijuana and the use of pipes and bongs was allowed; alcohol was also acceptable. All profile pictures were checked by photo moderators before appearing on a user page. Photos on a user's profile were not checked, but a "report abuse" button allowed another user to report abuses. Nexopia prohibited copyright infringement.

In March 2007, four students from the Elk Island school district in Sherwood Park, Alberta were expelled from school and twenty were given suspensions in a case of cyberbullying. Students used Nexopia to create teacher profiles in which classmates posted defamatory, nonsensical, derogatory and libellous information on the teachers' pages.

== Criticism ==
Nexopia was criticized by parent groups, who blamed their children's problems on the website and tried to have it shut down. This forced the site to become more strict about user posts.

Nexopia became a target for online predators. Since a user's profile could be completely open to the public, profile images and information were viewable. Users could post personal information such as their address, telephone number, family members, relationship status and school.

Online spam increased such as through "dummy" accounts that spam users, linking them to websites containing porn or malicious information. Users who did not follow the rules could get a simple ban from the website or have their account "frozen".

In March 2012, the website was found to be in violation of federal privacy laws by keeping personal information indefinitely. As of November 2012, Nexopia was working with the Privacy Commissioner to ensure regulatory compliance.

The site was used by convicted serial killer Cody Legebokoff, who met one victim, 15 year old Loren Leslie, there.

== Membership ==
Users with free accounts had access to standard features, such as forum posting, private messaging, user profiles with comments, photo uploading, a user blog and an image gallery. Monthly paid subscriptions were offered at $5 to fee gain access to extra features such as advanced user search, forum creation, increased media gallery capacity and online file storage, and the removal of ads.
