= Moose Hide campaign =

Indigenous grassroots movement

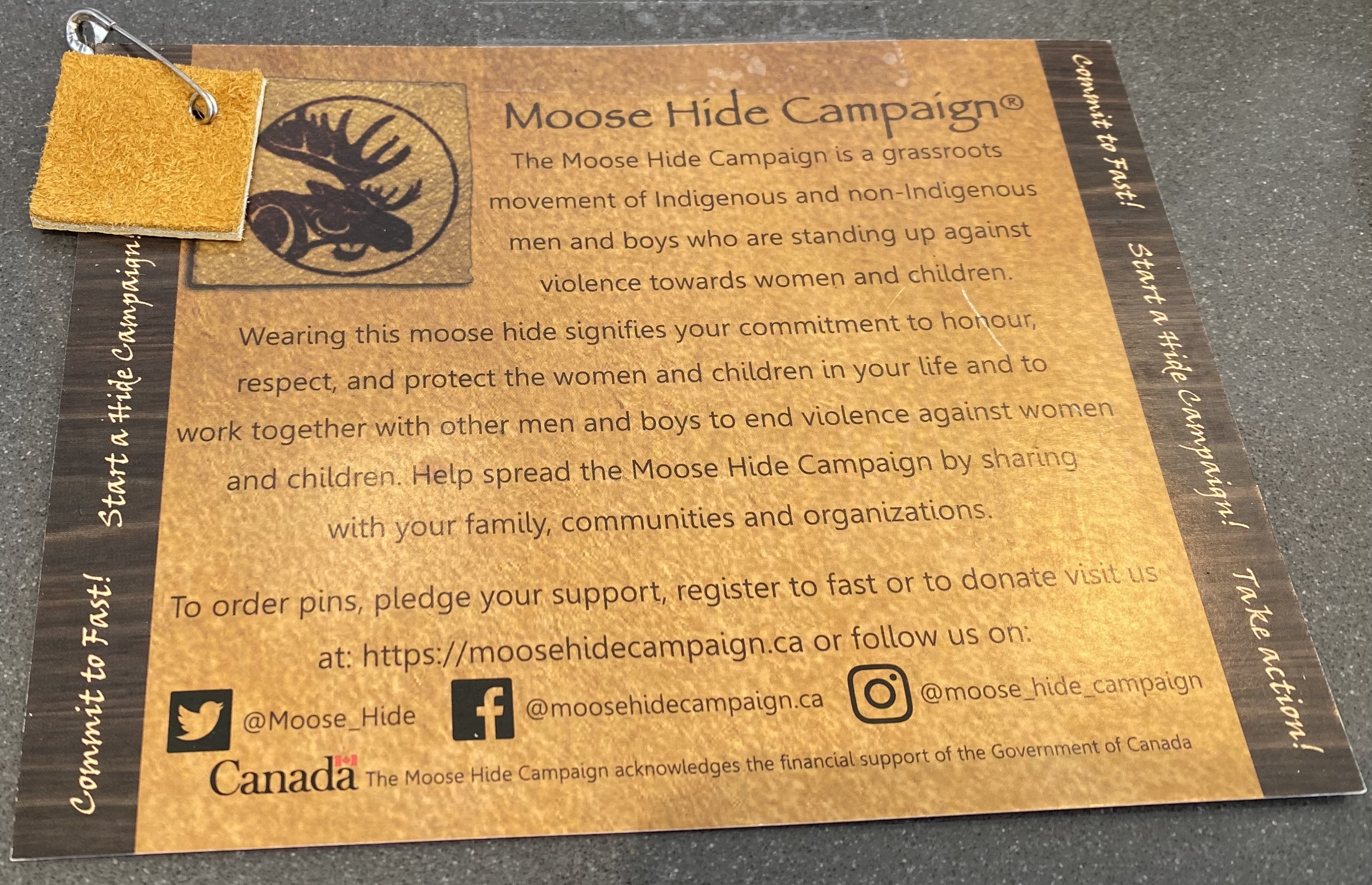
Moose Hide Campaign Pin and Informational Card

The Moose Hide Campaign is a grassroots movement of Indigenous and non-Indigenous men standing up against violence towards women and children. The campaign was created in 2011 by Paul Lacerte and his daughter Raven Lacerte. The campaign creates and distributes moose hide pins as a way to raise awareness about violence against women. Since inception the Moose Hide Campaign has distributed over two million moose hide pins and helped raise millions of dollars for the issue of gender-based violence.

== Background ==
The campaign was started in 2011 by Paul Lacerte and his daughters. After attending a violence against women conference in Vancouver where he was one of four men among hundreds of women, Lacerte became inspired to do something. The inspiration for the Moose Hide Campaign came shortly after the conference. The idea came to Lacerte and his daughter Raven during a hunting trip along British Columbia's Highway of Tears. The Highway of Tears, British Columbia Highway 16, between Prince George and Prince Rupert is infamous for being a location of many Missing and Murdered Indigenous Women (MMIW). After harvesting a moose, Lacerte decided to use the Moose Hide as a way to inspire men to become involved in the movement against violence against women. Using this initial moose and help of close family and friends, Lacerte cut the first 2,500 squares of moose hide for the campaign.

In 2018, Sage Lacerte, daughter of Paul Lacerte, became the National Youth Ambassador for the Moose Hide Campaign.

== Moose Hide Pins ==
The campaign makes moose hide pins by cutting small square sections of moose hide attached to a safety pin. The pins are designed to be worn on the lapel. The squares are made by Indigenous women, who are compensated for their work. The hides are donated by traditional Indigenous hunters, who hunt moose for food and ceremonial purposes, or animals that have died on Canadian roadways. No animals are hunted solely for the Moose Hide Campaign and instead respects the larger indigenous tradition of using every part of an animal slain. The campaign distributes the pins free of charge for any Canadian who wants one. Additionally, the campaign ships the pins free anywhere in Canada.

== Symbolism ==
The Moose Hide campaign aims to raise awareness about violence towards women by distributing pins cut from moose hide as a way to spark conversation about the topic. Additionally, wearing a pin signifies ones commitment to honouring, respecting and protecting, women and children. Finally, the patch works as an act of solidarity against gender-based violence.

== Education ==
=== Ten Men Challenge ===
In April 2017, the Moose Hide campaign launched the Ten Men Challenge. The Ten Men Challenge encourages young men to pledge to standing up against violence towards women and children.

The Ten Men Challenge takes ten male volunteers, all male students from ninth to eleventh grade, to fast for the day. The challenge's first pilot project was launched by Raven and Paul Lacerte at the Fraser Lake Elementary Secondary School. Fraser Lake Elementary Secondary School has used this program every year since, to help grow the Moose Hide Campaign and as an example of 'Reconciliation in Action'.

=== Moose Hide Learning Journey (K-12 Education) ===
In 2019, the Moose Hide Campaign launched the Moose Hide Learning Journey. The learning journey is an education initiative aimed at K-12 students as part of multi-pronged campaign to end violence against women and children.

The Moose Hide Learning Journey works to help teachers create a supportive learning environment. Furthermore, it urges students to explore values and perspectives that honour and respect women and children. The Moose Hide's K-12 education online platform provides lesson plans, videos and other resources for K-12 teachers and students. The technology has been piloted in a number of schools throughout the province of British Columbia.

This education initiative is supported in part by the British Columbia's provincial government.

== Moose Hide Day ==
To recognize the importance of the campaign, the provincial government has proclaimed February 11, as Moose Hide Campaign Day in British Columbia.

== Support ==
=== BC Government ===
In 2018, the Government of British Columbia provided $2 million in support to the Moose Hide Campaign.

=== Newfoundland and Labrador Government ===
The House of Assembly started supporting the Moose Hide Campaign in 2017 by wearing pins.
