= Isle Pierre, British Columbia =

Isle Pierre
- Location of Isle Pierre in British Columbia
- Coordinates: 53°56′59″N 123°15′05″W
- Country: Canada
- Province: British Columbia
- Region: Nechako
- Regional District: Fraser–Fort George
- Time zone: UTC−07:00 (PT)
- Area codes: 250, 778, 236, & 672

Isle Pierre is a railway point in the Nechako Region of central British Columbia. The scattered community straddles the shores of the Nechako River. The west side, off BC Highway 16, is by road about 55 kilometres (34 mi) west of Prince George and 69 kilometres (43 mi) east of Vanderhoof. The east side is by road about 46 kilometres (29 mi) west of Prince George.

== Name origin ==
The name derives from the small rocky island, which lies near the right bank, midway through rapids. Pierre is a French form of the name Peter, derived from the Greek Πέτρος, Petros, meaning "rock" or "stone". The early French-speaking fur traders ascribed the name, which means "rock island", to similar locations. The Isle de Pierre Rapids, named after the island, have an official mention by the 1890s. At Isle Pierre, the valley contracts on either side of the river, creating a short canyon. The hills rise sharply to 91 metres (300 ft) on the northeast side. On the southwest side, a series of benches rise 244 metres (800 ft). The lower bench carries the road and railway.

== Railway ==
The westward advance of the Grand Trunk Pacific Railway (GTP) rail head passed through Isle Pierre in early March 1914. On April 6, 1914, officials drove in the golden spike, completing the GTP transcontinental line (later part of the Canadian National Railway (CN)).

In 1929, about 40 CN employees fought a forest fire caused by railway operations. In 1954, when the Department of Public Works blasted a beaver dam, a torrent washed out the track 5 kilometres (3 mi) east of Isle Pierre. When a locomotive and two baggage cars of a passenger train plunged into a deep hole, a CN fireman was fatally crushed and burned. In July 1983, the eastward advance from Prince Rupert of a team upgrading the track to handle heavier locomotives reached Isle Pierre.

Train Timetables (Regular stop or Flag stop)
	Mile	1916	1920	1925	1932	1935	1942	1945	1950	1956	1960	1963	1967	1968
Stuart	50.2	Flag	Regular											
Finmoore	50.2			Regular	Regular	Regular	Regular	Regular	Regular	Regular	Flag	Flag	Flag	
Wedgwood	44.8		Flag	Flag	Flag	Flag	Flag	Flag	Flag	Flag				
Hutchison	38.8	Flag	Flag	Flag	Flag	Flag	Flag	Flag	Flag	Flag	Flag	Flag	Flag	
Isle Pierre	32.4	Flag	Flag	Flag	Flag	Flag	Flag	Flag	Flag	Flag	Flag	Flag	Flag	
Nichol	28.0	Flag	Flag	Flag	Flag	Flag	Flag	Flag	Flag	Flag				
Bednesti	20.0		Flag	Flag	Flag	Regular	Regular	Flag	Flag	Flag	Flag	Flag	Flag	
McBride Timber	16.1											Flag		
Chilako	13.9	Flag	Flag	Flag	Flag	Flag	Flag	Flag	Flag	Flag	Flag	Flag	Flag	

== Community ==
In 1922, Hans (Andy) G. Anderson opened a general store in a log building. In 1926, the farmers' institute opened a 10-by-6-metre (32 by 20 ft) community hall, which became the venue for social events and dances. Anderson was the inaugural postmaster 1928–1932.

In 1929, the school opened and used the community hall for several years but had a rent dispute with the farmers' institute. In 1932, Anton M. Dore took over the Anderson store, which he operated until 1937, when he relocated to McBride. Joseph Robert Boyd opened a wood frame store about 1.7 kilometres (1.1 mi) southwest of the western ferry dock. and was postmaster 1932–1939. Wilfred John Aizlewood was the final postmaster 1939–1956, operating a store for the greater part of that time.

During 1938–1939, the Anglicans held monthly services in the school building. Some summer services were held 1941–1944 and occasionally later in the decade.

In 1954, a new school building opened on a new site. In 1960, the former school property was tendered and sold. After BC Hydro extended transmission lines into the community in late 1963, the school was electrically wired for the 1964–65 school year catering to an enrolment of 15 pupils, before closing.

The abandoned wood frame store still stands.

== Sport and recreation ==
The annual Fort St. James–Prince George canoe race began in 1955. The race was shortened to be an Isle Pierre–Prince George course in 1960. The junior section of this annual Northern Hardware canoe race, covering Miworth–Prince George, commenced in 1971. In 1983, the race switched to a common Miworth starting point and the event lasted into the early 1990s. The annual event was revived in 2015 as an Isle Pierre–Prince George race, with the junior section (Simon Fraser Class) starting from Miworth.

== Ferry ==
About 1922, a subsidised rowboat service was established to provide a link between the settlements on both sides of the river. However, residents would have preferred a bridge rather than a small boat. Harold Fanshaw was the inaugural ferry operator. In September 1923, a surplus scow was brought down from Stuart (Finmoore). Able to carry horse teams and wagons, the reaction ferry was installed for the 1923–24 year. The next year, a more modern pontoon vessel replaced the scow. For the next decade, an ice bridge handled traffic most winters. A proposal for a 120-metre (400 ft) Howe truss bridge does not appear to have developed beyond the planning stage. When the ice was too thin, a rowboat was used, sometimes for the whole winter. This arrangement was inconvenient, because larger freight could not be carried and the general store was a mile from the western dock.

In February 1931, when a yoke broke between a team hauling down the hill, the out-of-control tie-laden sleigh forced the horses off the end of the ferry into the water. In summer 1932, Hans Anderson erected a new home at the ferry site and became the operator. The following summer, a new 5-ton ferry was launched. After a winter without an ice bridge, the ferry was slipped into the water in mid-February 1935, to carry ties. In subsequent years the channel was usually kept open during winter.

In 1945–46, concrete anchors were installed for the cables. In 1947–48, the ferry was rebuilt with steel pontoons and new deck. In 1949–50, new cable towers were installed.

In October 1952, when the diversion tunnel at the upstream Kenney Dam was closed, the water level at the ferry dropped 1 metre (3 ft) within 72 hours. As a consequence, the ferry approaches to the landings were extended.

In 1963, the nearby road was washed out, becoming unsuitable for tourist traffic bypassing Highway 16 and taking the scenic route. Several years passed before the damage was repaired. During the next winter, river ice terminated the ferry season in January. By the mid-1960s, the hours of free operation were 7am–noon, 1pm–5pm, and 6pm–7pm. After-hours openings levied a $1 toll for trucks and 50 cents for cars.

In 1970–71, the western landing was reconstructed. Low water ended the season in November 1977, when a new cable and tower structure were installed. In the following spring, the ferry was attached to the new cable. For sawmill workers living on the eastern side, closures meant an 80-kilometre (50 mi) trip via Prince George rather than a few kilometres drive. In subsequent years, low water permitted only a four- to five-month season. Residents believed the pattern of closures was primarily motivated by a government wish to phase out the ferry. In late July 1981, the season only started in response to local lobbying. After-hours service, attracting a toll charge, was no longer provided. In November 1982, the final ferry run occurred. The government announced in May 1983 that the service would not be resuming.

To address a pollution hazard, the abandoned wood and steel structures were removed in 2000.

== Forestry ==
Smaller sawmills existed in the immediate area from the 1940s. Lloyd Bros. Lumber operated more significant sawmills at Swede Creek, then Cluculz Lake, and then Isle Pierre. In 1961, operations wound down at Cluculz Lake, and construction began on the Isle Pierre mill.

Fires in 1962 left the mill in ruins and in 1963 destroyed a dry kiln and lumber. In 1964, the mill was converted to electrical power and a new barker was installed. Also modified at this time, the Meridian Forest Products mill appears to be related.

In 1969, Takla Development acquired the two operations. Canadian Forest Products was the ultimate parent company. The next year, a fire destroyed the Lloyd Bros. dry kiln and lumber.

In 1976, $1.1 million of modifications were made for the mill to process smaller diameter wood and increase production. The workforce increased from about 100 to 115.

In 1985, a $2.5 million modernization project switched the mill to producing shorter lumber lengths, which reduced the product line, eliminated 16 jobs, and gave more lumber from each log.

In 1999, a $24 million upgrade led to an additional shift.

The mill had 94 employees prior to closing in late 2020.

== Accidents and incidents ==
1937: When the harnessed horses bolted, three children thrown from a careening wagon sustained serious injuries and one horse died.

1941: When mistaken for a bear in a hunting accident, a man was shot in the leg, which was later amputated in hospital.

1960: When an Aeronca Champion seaplane crashed nearby, the two occupants sustained only minor cuts and bruises, but the plane was destroyed.

1966: A hunter in the vicinity was fatally shot when mistaken for a moose.

1967: A trailer being raised by a forklift slipped and fatally crushed a teenager at the Lloyd Bros. sawmill.

1969: A man who shot a fellow section hand, with whom he shared a cabin and had a strained relationship, was found guilty of manslaughter. An operator at the Lloyd Bros. sawmill was fatally electrocuted when his forklift touched a 14,000-volt high tension wire.

1995: On falling into a packing machine while performing maintenance, A Canfor millwright was killed.

2003: A lumber truck driver, who fell from the top of his load, died while dangling upside down in a harness.

2009: The RCMP were unsuccessful in searching a property on Pinewood Road for the body of a missing woman. The landowner had been convicted of killing his brother.

== Nichol ==
While the post office existed during 1916–1930, George E. Boothroyd was postmaster. During 1920 and 1921, he ran a general store.

Resident H. Thorne-Edwards, nephew of Sir William Thorne, was a primarily a published author, rather than a farmer. Better known as Harry Edwards, a two-war veteran, he first advertised the Edwards Ranch, 1.6 kilometres (1 mi) from the Nichol station, for sale in 1921. After four years residence, the extended family relocated in 1923 after selling the property to Carl Miller.

Around 1922, the Nichol and Isle Pierre Farmers' Institute was founded. The final mention of a store was the one H. Witcher ran 1922–1924. The store opened by Jimmie Ferreira in 1924 seems to have been short lived. By this time, road links existed to Isle Pierre and Bednesti.

In 1931, tie contractors built a wooden bridge across the river to move their product. Local residents expected the structure to last several years.

== Maps ==
- "Official motorist's guide of British Columbia". library.ubc.ca. 1931. p. 68 (30).
- Nechako road map. 1948.
- "Shell BC map". www.davidrumsey.com. 1956. Archived from the original on 2022-10-17.

== See also ==
- List of Inland Ferries in British Columbia
