= Bernie Williams (artist) =

Haida and Coast Salish artist (born 1957)

Bernie Williams, (born October 2, 1957) also known as Skundaal and Gul Kitt Jaad (Golden Spruce Woman), is a Haida and Coast Salish artist and activist for Missing and Murdered Indigenous Women and Girls (MMIWG) and for Vancouver's Downtown Eastside (DTES). She carved the Survivors' Totem Pole among other works.

Williams co-founded Walk4Justice with Gladys Radek and spent decades advocating for the National Inquiry Into Missing and Murdered Indigenous Women and Girls.

== Personal life ==
Williams was born in Old Massett, Haida Gwaii, in British Columbia, Canada. She grew up with her grandparents, matriarch Nonnie Ouii Agnes Williams and Hereditary Chief Robert Williams Stheithlhdaah. She has three sons.

Williams is a survivor of residential school and of abuse. Her mother and two of her sisters were murdered in separate incidents in the 1970s. Several women she knew, including her close friend Georgina Papin, were murdered by Robert Pickton.

== Activism ==
Williams has lived in the Downtown Eastside since the 1980s, and provides frontline support services and advocacy for women there. She co-founded the Sacred Circle Women's Center in the neighbourhood. Williams told Vice TV that she became an advocate for women in the DTES after her mother was murdered there.

After meeting Gladys Radek, an advocate for action on the Highway of Tears, the two co-founded Walk4Justice along with Vikki Peters and Nicole Tait in 2006. The group organized annual long-distance walks that were instrumental in bringing about the National Public Inquiry Into Missing and Murdered Indigenous Women and Girls. Their final walk in 2011 was from Vancouver to Ottawa. At the end of that walk, Williams spoke to the Status of Women Committee. Williams gave public testimony at the inquiry in 2018.

== Art ==
Williams is the only female apprentice of famed Haida carver Bill Reid. She has carved at least 12 totem poles, including three in Vancouver. She designed and led the carving of the Survivors Totem Pole as a celebration of the resilience of Downtown Eastside residents and their ancestors. It was a collaboration between DTES advocates, the local host First Nations, members of the LGBTQ+ community, and Japanese, Chinese, and South Asian survivors of violence. The pole is the subject of a 24-minute documentary by Susanne Tabata.

Following the National Inquiry Into Missing and Murdered Indigenous Women and Girls, Indigenous women who had advocated for decades for the inquiry were gifted coppers carved by Williams.
