= Kent Institution =

Prison in British Columbia, Canada

Coordinates: 49°15′34″N 121°49′50″W

Kent Institution (French: Établissement de Kent) is a Correctional Service of Canada (CSC) facility located in Agassiz, British Columbia. Opened in 1979, Kent is the only maximum security federal penitentiary in the CSC's Pacific region, which includes the province of British Columbia and the Yukon territory. The majority of offenders at the facility are sentenced in other provinces. Educational programs, as well as socialization and employment, play a significant role at the institution. The facility employs over 300 people. The capacity (number of inmates) is 378.

== Major incidents ==
June 19, 1990 – Two prisoners, Robert Lee Ford and David Thomas, escaped when a hijacked helicopter landed in the courtyard. Correctional Officer R. Kirby was shot during the incident and survived.

May 1999 – Eighty-four prisoners rioted and barricaded themselves in the gym before the ERT could be called in to defuse the situation.

June 2003 – One prisoner was stabbed to death while prisoners in three units rioted, setting fires and barricading doors until the ERT responded and locked down the institution.

January 5, 2004 - A 19-year-old prisoner was stabbed twice in the abdomen.

April 6, 2004 - A prisoner was stabbed.

May 9, 2004 - A prisoner was stabbed while inside his cell.

May 18, 2004 - A prisoner was stabbed numerous times.

August 20, 2004 - A prisoner was stabbed.

November 2008 – One prisoner, Andrew Robert Craig, was stabbed to death in the institution's gymnasium. Four prisoners have since been charged with first-degree murder, which indicates the police have evidence that the crime was premeditated.

March 18, 2009 - A prisoner commits suicide.

January 28, 2010 - Two assaults against officers at Kent Institution. A warning shot was fired.

March 19, 2010 - A prisoner was stabbed in the gymnasium. Warning shots were fired by staff.

April 16, 2010 - Officers seize 19 grams of heroin.

August 4, 2010 - A prisoner was stabbed in a living unit. Warning shots were fired by officers.

November 14, 2010 - A prisoner was stabbed in the gymnasium.

March 27, 2011 - A prisoner was stabbed in the weight training area of the gymnasium.

May 20, 2011 - A prisoner was stabbed.

July 13, 2011 - A prisoner was found dead in his cell.

May 2013 - Jesse Lahn, 33, was found hanging in his cell in segregation.

March 2025 - A prisoner was assaulted.

== Notable inmates, past and present ==
- Eric Carty, conspirator in the Pan murders; died in his cell on April 26, 2018
- Lenford Crawford, conspirator in the murder of Bich-Ha Pan and the attempted murder of Hann Pan, masterminded by Jennifer Pan
- Terry Driver
- Edward Dennis Isaac, serial killer who murdered one woman and two teenage girls.
- Michael Wayne McGray
- Robert Pickton
- Stephen Reid
- Cody Legebokoff, serial killer from the Highway of Tears
