= Disappearance of Jean Virginia Sampare =

Missing person, British Columbia, Canada

Jean Virginia Sampare
- Ginny Sampare
- Born: September 10, 1953
- Disappeared: October 14, 1971 (aged 18); Gitsegukla, British Columbia
- Status: Missing for 53 years, 8 months and 3 days
- Occupation: Cannery worker

Jean Virginia (Ginny) Sampare is a Canadian woman who went missing on Thursday, October 14, 1971, outside Gitsegukla, British Columbia, Canada. She was last seen by her cousin near the railroad overpass on Highway 16 outside of Gitsegukla. Sampare's cousin, who was walking with her, went to get a jacket or a bike from his home and when he came back Sampare was gone. Despite searches by local residents, civil defence personnel, and police, she has not been seen since.

Despite multiple theories surrounding what could have led to her disappearance, there has been no conclusive evidence to back any of them up.

== Background ==
=== Virginia Sampare ===
Jean Virginia Sampare, known as Ginny to her family, was born on September 10, 1953, into a First Nations family of Gitxsan descent. The second youngest of six children, she was described as a shy and quiet child. She attended high school in Hazelton, British Columbia. She was characterized as a caretaker for her siblings, who protected them when their father drank too much.

At the time of her disappearance, she was living with her parents in Gitsegukla. Sampare was planning to move to Terrace with her younger brother Rod later in the month. He stated in the inquiry that she was careful and did not partake in any high-risk activities. She was known to inform others of her plans, and those close to her considered it out of character for her to leave unannounced.

She worked at a salmon canning plant in Claxton, where her boyfriend had also worked. He had gone missing shortly before she disappeared. His remains were found after Sampare disappeared. He had drowned in the Skeena River.

=== Gitsegukla ===
Gitsegukla is a village located in the Skeena Valley between Hazelton and Kitwanga, British Columbia. It is in the center of the Hazelton mountain group. The area is largely mountainous with the Skeena River and some of its tributaries running through it. Topsoil is sparse, with a sandstone/shale bedrock exposed or just below the soil surface in much of the area above the Skeena, and sand, gravel and clay with exposed bedrock near and under the Skeena River. Animals in the area include salmon, trout, eagle, ravens, robins, black bears, elk, lynx, owl, coyotes, wolves and deer. There are numerous mines in the area; some were active in the 1970s, but many of them were abandoned shaft-mines. Gitsegukla is located on an Indian reserve in traditional Gitxsan territory. The band operates out of Gitsegukla.

== Disappearance ==
The night of the disappearance, October 14, 1971, Sampare's sister-in-law Violet testified that she saw her at her mother's house. Violet said that Sampare's mother came home and went into the kitchen. Soon after Sampare came out of the kitchen and looked like she was crying. Violet said she tried to ask what was wrong but that Sampare promptly walked out of the door. Violet tried to call Sampare and ask where she was going. Violet tried to get Sampare, but her mother-in-law stopped her, saying that "She'll come back." Violet said that this was between 10:00 pm and 11:00 pm.

Sampare's cousin was reported to be the last person to have seen her. He was walking with Sampare alongside Highway 16 when he left to either get a jacket or a bike and then rejoin her. He believed at the time that Sampare was going to a store that was close to the railroad overpass outside of town. His house was close to where he parted from Sampare, just south of the highway. Violet reported that Alvin came back to the highway and heard a vehicle door close, but Sampare was nowhere to be seen.

There is no public record regarding the items which Sampare had taken with her when she went missing. Though it was a cold night, she had left her jacket at home.

== Investigation ==
=== Missing persons report ===
After Sampare did not return home that night, her mother reported her missing the next morning to the Gitsegukla Indian Band office in Gitsegukla. Someone at the band office mistakenly said that they had to wait a certain amount of time before reporting the disappearance to the Royal Canadian Mounted Police (RCMP). The band office sent someone to South Hazelton and Kitimat to see if she was with her sisters Winnie or Anna, but she was not. After talking with Sampare's friends, some of them in Kispiox, they went to the RCMP.

On October 16, the RCMP took a missing person's report from Sampare's mother. The RCMP checked with Anna, Winnie, and Sampare's friends and other family and confirmed that no one had made contact with her since she was last seen by Alvin.

=== Search effort ===
Searchers and civil defence personnel searched dense brush around the area where Sampare was last seen. On October 27, a helicopter joined the search effort.

The search was officially called off on October 28.

== Theories ==
=== Suicide ===
Sampare's parents felt suicide would not be characteristic of her. Although she may have been under stress from the disappearance of her boyfriend and the altercation with her mother, there is no public knowledge of a suicide note or any indication that she was suicidal.

=== Runaway ===
Sampare did not have a history of running away. Her family said it would be unlike her to break contact with her relations so abruptly and for such a prolonged period of time. In addition to this, though it was a cold night, Sampare left her jacket at home, which indicated that she was not planning on being outside for long.

=== Foul play ===
The RCMP have not ruled out nor proven foul play in her disappearance. There is no strong evidence that she had a misadventure or committed suicide, and Sampare leaving behind her jacket on that cold night was evidence against the theory that she ran away. Also, Alvin's report that he heard a vehicle door close just before he was expecting to meet up with Sampare supports the theory that she was taken by vehicle. There is no available evidence suggesting any of Sampare's family, friends, or associates had any reason to cause her disappearance.

=== Highway of Tears ===
Sampare went missing one year, almost to the day, after Helen Claire Frost, who disappeared on Tuesday, October 13, 1970, and three years before Monica Ignas, who disappeared on Friday, December 13, 1974. Frost disappeared from Prince George, British Columbia, and Ignas from Thornhill, British Columbia. The three cases are some of the first in a series of murders and disappearances upon what would later be called the Highway of Tears.

== Later developments ==
=== RCMP investigation ===
The RCMP reported to Rod that the case was closed in 1985, citing a report from the Gitsegukla band Chief Councillor in 1971 that Sampare had drowned, an assertion for which there was no conclusive evidence. The case was subsequently re-opened after the family complained.

Her younger brother Rod reported he asked the RCMP for a copy of the complete missing persons file but was refused.

The RCMP also took DNA from Sampare's siblings around 2006. The family believed that this was in response to the Robert Pickton investigation. Nothing was reported publicly as to whether this produced any further leads in the case.

=== Awareness efforts by the family ===
Her band at one time had tried to list her as being deceased; however, after pushback from Sampare's mother, they changed her status back to missing.

Both Winnie and Rod Sampare have talked to the media about their sister's disappearance and they spoke along with Victoria at an inquiry on missing and murdered Indigenous women and girls in September 2017.

== See also ==
- List of people who disappeared
