= Terry Driver =

Canadian murderer

- Born: 27 January 1965; Canada
- Died: 23 August 2021 (aged 56); Abbotsford, British Columbia, Canada
- Other name: Abbotsford Killer
- Parent(s): Grant Driver (father), Audrey Tighe (mother)

Details
- Date: 13 October 1995; 31 years ago
- Locations: Abbotsford, British Columbia, Canada
- Targets: Misty Cockerill and Tanya Smith
- Killed: 1
- Injured: 1
- Weapon: Baseball bat

Terry Driver (27 January 1965 – 23 August 2021) was a Canadian murderer who attacked two teenage girls with a baseball bat, killed one, then taunted police in Abbotsford, British Columbia with letters and phone calls.

== Crimes and investigation ==
On 13 October 1995, 16-year-old Misty Cockerill and Tanya Smith were walking to a party when Driver broke through a hedge nearby with a baseball bat and ordered the girls to come through the bush. After stumbling into a clearing, Driver told both girls to remove their clothes. While Smith complied, Cockerill attempted to fight back, grabbing the bat and hitting Driver across the back as he prepared to sexually assault (SA) Smith. Driver eventually overpowered Cockerill and beat her into unconsciousness. Cockerill regained consciousness in a parking lot and walked to the hospital, where she was immediately rushed into surgery for severe skull fractures. Later that morning, Smith's badly beaten body was found in the Vedder River. Though she would have succumbed to the injuries sustained from the beating, it was established that she drowned.

After the attack, Driver engaged in a course of bizarre behaviour that eventually led to his capture. He made a series of telephone calls to police and emergency services in which he refused to give his name, but clearly identified himself as the killer, and threatened more crimes. Driver, whose father had been a police officer, had an obsession with scanners, and used one to monitor police responses to his telephone calls. He attended the funeral of Tanya Smith, and then later stole her tombstone, wrote a threatening message to Cockerill on it, and then put it on the hood of a car belonging to a radio station. He also threw a wrench with a note to police through a random person's front window. The note mentioned three other similar assaults for which he sought credit. He had left a thumbprint on some tape around the package, and he had left DNA on the body and a bite mark on the victim's breast. Police arranged for the broadcast of recordings of the telephone calls, and Driver's brother recognised his voice, his mother concurred in the identification. Police determined that Driver's thumbprint matched the one on the tape, and he was arrested in 1996.

== Trial and imprisonment ==
After his arrest, Driver denied that he had beaten the two girls. He claimed he had happened upon them after the crime, raped the unconscious Tanya, and thrown her body in the Vedder. He claimed he had driven Cockerill to the hospital. At trial, he did not raise an insanity defence, but claimed he had Tourette's syndrome, obsessive compulsive disorder (OCD) and attention deficit disorder (ADD), and urged these impairments be considered to explain his actions. He used this argument to explain that the confessions he gave were false and the product of his disorders. Because of the emotional response that was inevitable in a trial, Driver elected to be tried in front of a judge instead of a jury. The judge was unpersuaded by Driver's arguments and he was convicted in 1997 of the first-degree murder of Tanya Smith and the attempted murder of Misty Cockerill, declared a dangerous offender, and received a mandatory life sentence from Judge Wally Oppal. He appealed in 2001, however lost.

In a later trial, Driver was convicted of two of the assaults he mentioned in the letter that he threw through the window.

In 2006, Driver was transferred from protective custody at Kent Institution to the Pacific Institution/Regional Treatment Centre in Abbotsford for treatment. Corrections Canada came under criticism for this move.

Driver died in prison on 23 August 2021 of natural causes according to a statement from the Correctional Service of Canada.
