= E-Pana =

Division of the Royal Canadian Mounted Police

Project E-Pana is a Royal Canadian Mounted Police (RCMP) task force created in 2005 with the purpose of solving cases of missing and murdered persons, all female, along a section of Highway 16 between Prince Rupert, British Columbia and Prince George, British Columbia, dubbed the Highway of Tears. Though it started with the scope of investigating victims of Highway 16, within a year of formation, it morphed to include victims along Highways 5, 24 and 97. It is no longer specifically dedicated to Highway of Tears cases.

== Origins ==
The name E-Pana was chosen from a concatenation of E from "E" Division, which is the RCMP division that has jurisdiction over British Columbia (BC), and Pana, which is the name of an Inuit goddess who cares for souls before heaven or reincarnation.

The task force was created during the Fall of 2005 in order to investigate a series of unsolved murders and disappearances along BC's Highway of Tears, and determine whether a serial killer or killers is operating there. In 2006, the Task Force took ownership of nine investigations. In 2007 the number of cases doubled from nine to eighteen.

The criteria for case selection was changed around this time to more precisely define E-Pana victims.

E-Pana consists of 13 murder investigations and 5 disappearances, ranging in date from 1969 to 2006.

== Victims list ==
Thirteen of the eighteen victims on the E-Pana list were teenagers; ten of aboriginal descent.

The following criteria must be met by the victims in order to be added to the E-Pana list:

1. The victim was female;
2. The victim was engaged in one or more 'high risk' behaviours, i.e., behaviours which would tend to place them in the control of strangers in isolated environments without witnesses (e.g. outside the sight and earshot of the bystanders), easy avenues of escape or sources of assistance – primary examples of this would be hitchhiking alone or sex work;
3. The victim went missing from, or her body was found near, Highway 16 from Prince Rupert to Hinton, Highway 97 from Merritt to Fort Nelson, or Highways 5 and 24 connecting Valemount and 100 Mile House; and,
4. The evidence indicated a stranger attack, i.e., no suspect was seen or identifiable and there was no grounds to believe that death was the result of suicide, misadventure or domestic violence.

Name	Age	Fate	Last location	Year	Notes	Highway of Tears	Suspect	Ethnicity
Gloria Moody	26	Homicide	Williams Lake	1969	She was last seen on October 25, leaving a bar in Williams Lake. Her body was found in the woods at a cattle ranch 10 km (6.2 mi) away.	No		First Nations
Micheline Pare	18	Homicide	Hudson's Hope	1970	Last seen on Highway 29 at the gates of Tompkins Ranch situated between Fort St. John and Hudson's Hope. Two women who had given her a ride had dropped her off there. Her body was found at Hudson's Hope on August 8.	No		Caucasian
Gale Weys	19	Homicide	Clearwater	1973 (October)	Disappeared while hitchhiking from Clearwater to Kamloops. Her body was found in a ditch on Highway 5 south of Clearwater.	No	Bobby Jack Fowler is a person of interest.	Caucasian
Pamela Darlington	19	Homicide	Kamloops	1973 (November)	Vanished from Kamloops while hitchhiking to a local bar. Her body was found the next day.	No	Bobby Jack Fowler is a person of interest.	Caucasian
Monica Ignas	14	Homicide	Thornhill	1974 (December)	She was believed to be going home from school when she was last seen at 11pm on December 13, 1974, in Thornhil. She was walking home alone. Her body was found in a gravel pit or a densely forested area on April 6, 1975, east of Terrace, near Celgar Forest Service Road. Two witnesses reported seeing a car pulled over to the side of the road the night Ignas vanished. The pair saw a man and a passenger who looked like a girl inside the vehicle. Monica had been strangled.	Yes		Caucasian
Colleen MacMillen	16	Homicide	100 Mile House	1974 (August)	Last seen leaving her home in Lac La Hache to hitchhike to a nearby friend's house.	No	DNA evidence reveals a match to convicted American rapist and murder suspect Bobby Jack Fowler, who had died in prison in 2006. He had been working in BC in 1974.	Caucasian
Monica Jack	12	Homicide	Merritt	1978 (May)	Monica Jack was last seen riding her bike on May 6, 1978, near Nicola Lake. For 17 years after she disappeared, Jack's fate was unknown. In June 1995, forestry workers found skeletal human remains in a ravine off a logging road on Swakum Mountain, about 20 km (12 mi) from where Monica's bike was found. Dental records and DNA testing confirmed her identity.	No	Garry Taylor Handlen was charged October 22, 2018 for the murders of Monica Jack and 11-year-old Kathryn-Mary Herbert. On 18 January 2019, Handlen was convicted of the first degree murder of Monica Jack.	First Nations
Maureen Mosie	33	Homicide	Kamloops	1981 (May)	Maureen Mosie, 33, was believed to be hitchhiking from Salmon Arm to Kamloops in the B.C. Interior, when she was last seen on May 8, 1981. Her body was found the next day by a woman walking her dog along a road off the Trans-Canada highway about 16 km (9.9 mi) east of Kamloops. She had been severely beaten.	No		Caucasian
Shelly-Anne Bascu	16	Missing	Hinton, Alberta	1983	Several days after disappearing, personal items including clothing and blood droplets matching her blood type were found near the Athabasca River.	No		Caucasian
Alberta Gail Williams	24	Homicide	Prince Rupert	1989 (August)	Alberta Williams went missing on Aug. 25, 1989. Her body was found on 25 Sept. 1989, about 37 km (23 mi) east of Prince Rupert, B.C., near the Tyee Overpass. She had been strangled and sexually assaulted.	Yes		First Nations
Delphine Nikal	16	Missing	Smithers	1990 (June)	Delphine Nikal vanished on June 13, 1990. The 15-year-old teenager was hitchhiking east from the town of Smithers, B.C.	Yes		First Nations
Ramona Wilson	16	Homicide	Smithers	1994 (June)	She was hitchhiking from Smithers to attend a dance and stay with friends in Hazelton, BC on June 1, 1994. Ramona's remains were found April 1995 north of Yellich Road near the Smithers Airport. Several items were in a small organized pile a few feet away. Other objects nearby included a half-buried small section of rope, three interlocking nylon ties and a small pink "brass knuckles" type water pistol.	Yes		First Nations
Roxanne Thiara	15	Homicide	Burns Lake	1994 (July)	She went missing in Prince George on the July long weekend in 1994. She had worked as a prostitute and told a friend she was going out with a customer. She walked around the corner of a building and was never heard from again. Her body was found August 17, 1994, in the bush along Highway 16, 6 km (3.7 mi) east of Burns Lake. She knew victim Alisha Germaine	Yes		First Nations
Alishia 'Leah' Germaine	15	Homicide	Prince George	1994 (December)	She was found murdered on December 9, 1994, behind Haldi Road Elementary School off of Highway 16 W. outside of Prince George. Leah was stabbed to death. She knew victim Roxanne Thiara	Yes		First Nations
Lana Derrick	19	Missing	Thornhill	1995 (October)	She was last seen in October 1995 at a service station in Thornhill. One rumor said she got into the car with two unidentified men.	Yes		First Nations
Nicole Hoar	24	Missing	Prince George	2002 (June)	Nicole Hoar was last seen hitchhiking to Smithers. Originally from Red Deer, Alberta, Nicole was last seen at a gas station at 5952 Gauthier Road, west of Prince George, on June 21, 2002, at approximately 14:50 talking to a 30-ish year old caucasian man in an orange car.	Yes	Police investigated convicted murderer Leland Vincent Switzer and searched his Isle Pierre property but didn't find any human remains.	Caucasian
Tamara Lynn Chipman	22	Missing	Prince Rupert	2005 (September)	Last seen in Prince Rupert, on September 25, 2005, while hitchhiking east on Highway 16 near the Industrial Park.	Yes		First Nations
Aielah Saric Auger	14	Homicide	Prince George	2006 (February)	The body of Aielah Saric-Auger, 14, was found February 10, 2006 shortly after she went missing on February 2, 2006. A motorist found Saric-Auger in a ditch on Highway 16 near Tabor Mountain, nearly 20 km (12 mi) east of Prince George.	Yes		First Nations

== Suspects and convictions ==
Investigators are confident that a single serial killer is not responsible for all of the E-PANA investigations. To date only one suspect has been charged in any of the E-Pana cases, Garry Taylor Handlen. Handlen was charged with the murder of 12 year old Monica Jack. Bobby Jack Fowler is believed through DNA evidence to have been responsible for the murder of Colleen MacMillen, but died in prison before charges could be laid. Fowler is also the prime suspect in the murders of Gale Weys and Pamela Darlington.

On September 25, 2012, the RCMP announced a link between the murders and Fowler. His supposed DNA was found on the body of Colleen MacMillen, one of the presumed victims. Investigators first compiled a DNA profile of the perpetrator in 2007, but technology available at the time did not yield a strong enough sample. New technologies allowed police to re-examine the DNA in 2012, leading to the identification. In addition, Fowler is also strongly suspected of having killed both Gale Weys and Pamela Darlington in 1973. The RCMP believe that he may have also killed as many as ten or possibly even twenty of the other victims. Several of the E-Pana murders took place after Fowler's arrest in June 1995.

In December 2014, a serial rapist named Garry Taylor Handlen was charged with the murders of Monica Jack and 11-year-old Kathryn-Mary Herbert. Police said that Handlen was previously a suspect, but they had not had enough evidence to charge him. According to CBC, the RCMP said that the December 2014 arrest was attributed in part to advances in forensic science, but the specific details were not released. Handlen was convicted on 17 January 2019, for the first degree murder of Monica Jack. The Crown prosecution's case was based largely upon Handlen's confession which was extracted as part of a Mr. Big sting operation.

None of the solved E-Pana cases involve victims that were found or taken near the Highway of Tears.

== Funding and resources ==
In the 2009/2010 year, E-Pana received over five million dollars in annual funding but has since dramatically declined due to budget cutbacks; receiving only $806,109 for the 2013/2014 year. In 2013, Craig Callens, the RCMP Deputy Commissioner, warned that further budget reductions from the provincial government would greatly affect investigations. A 2014 Freedom of Information request stated that the task force had dropped from seventy officers to twelve officers since 2010.

== See also ==
- List of people who disappeared mysteriously: post-1970
