= Matt Smiley =

Canadian artist (born 1981)

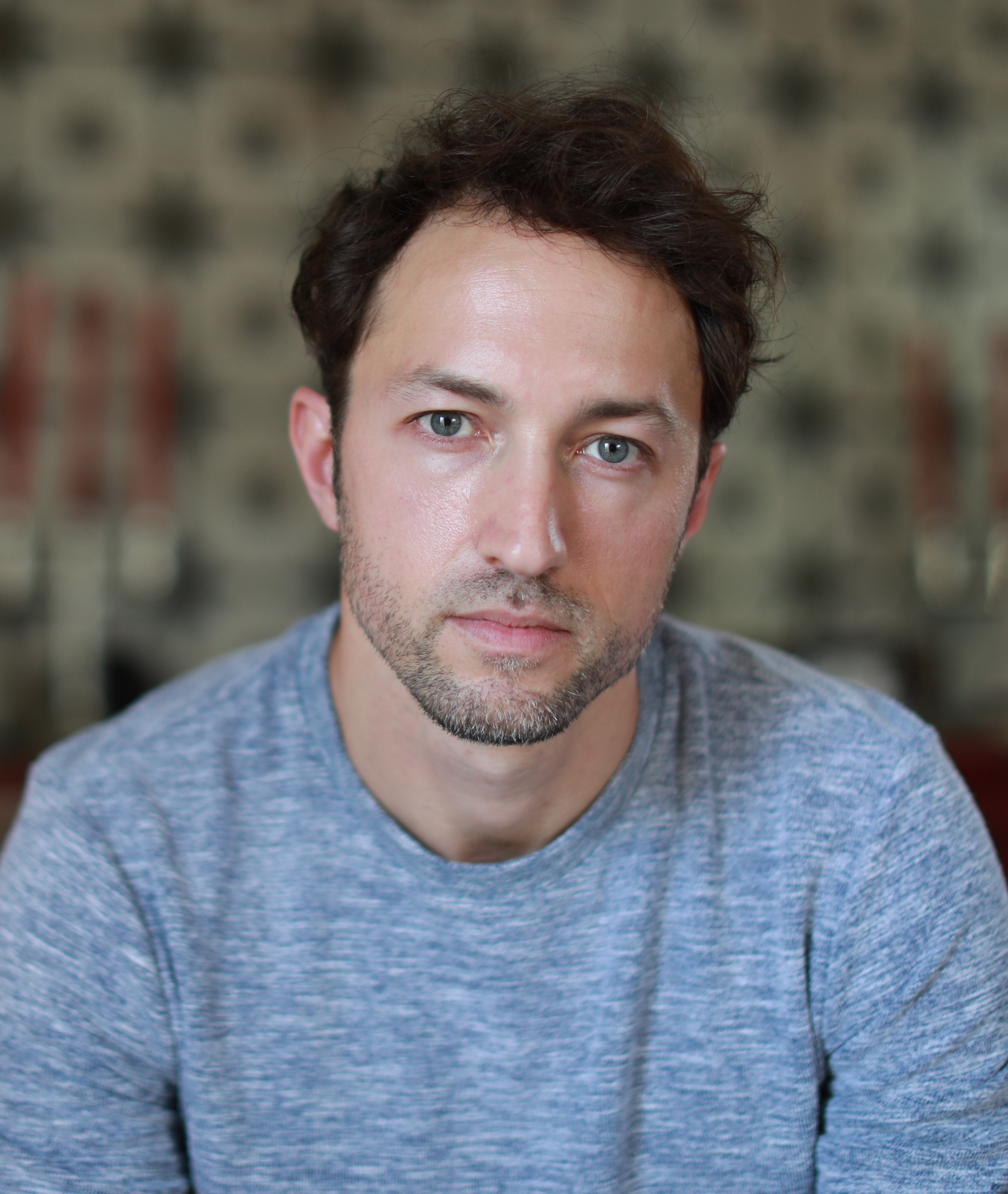
- Website: mattsmiley.com

Matt Smiley (born 1981) is a Canadian artist.

== Biography ==
Growing up in Quebec, Smiley initially pursued acting before focusing on visual arts. He has spoken of being influenced by Marilyn Manson.

== Art career ==
=== Selected exhibitions ===
- 2024: "Love, Nostalgia, & the Tempest of my Mind," 1 Hotel West Hollywood, CA.
- 2023: "Emotions: Work in Progress," at 1 Hotel West Hollywood, CA, with proceeds benefiting TreePeople.

== Documentary filmmaking ==
Smiley has earned acclaim for his documentaries:

- Highway of Tears (2014) - Directed by Smiley, this documentary focuses on the missing women along Highway 16 in British Columbia.
- For Love (2022) - Narrated by Shania Twain, this documentary addresses the overrepresentation of Indigenous children in Canada's foster care system.

== Personal life ==
Smiley was previously married to actress Lyndsy Fonseca. The couple married in April 2009 but separated in July 2012. Fonseca filed for divorce in January 2013, citing irreconcilable differences. There were no children from the marriage.
