= Survivors' Totem Pole =

Coordinates: 49°16′54″N 123°06′16″W

The Survivors' Totem Pole is a totem pole carved by Haida and Coast Salish artist Skundaal Bernie Williams, which stands in Pigeon Park in the Downtown Eastside (DTES) neighbourhood of Vancouver, British Columbia, Canada. The pole was the first to represent all cultures. It symbolizes "resistance, persistence, and inclusion" for survivors of the DTES as well as survivors of colonialism, poverty, and racism. The pole was carved from a 27-foot, 982-year-old red cedar log from Haida Gwaii and raised on November 5, 2016.

== History ==
Williams has said that Mark Townsend, co-founder of the Portland Hotel Society, was the first person to suggest commemorating DTES residents facing oppression. Williams began consultations for the pole in 2013, as a project of the Downtown Eastside Sacred Circle Society (which she co-founded) and Vancouver Moving Theatre, with endorsement from the chiefs of the host First Nations, Musqueam, Squamish and Tsleil-Waututh. Community collaborators included Japanese, Chinese and South Asian survivors of racism, members of the LGBTQ community, and DTES advocates. The pole was carved over three years, partly funded through a Kickstarter campaign.

The pole was raised in a potlatch ceremony following Haida and Coast Salish protocols. Witnesses included MLA Melanie Mark, Vancouver mayor Gregor Robertson and more than a dozen elders, matriarchs, and hereditary chiefs.

== Design ==
At the top of a pole is an eagle, which Williams has said is the closest messenger to the Creator, carrying prayers.

Below the eagle is a raven, representing transformation and the changes DTES residents are always making.

Next is a whale, representing strength.

At the bottom of the pole is a mother bear. Williams has said that when female Haida carvers, who are rare, carve a bear, they always put it at the bottom representing how women hold up the weight of the rest.
