= Gladys Radek =

Canadian Indigenous human rights activist

Gladys Radek (born c. 1955) is a Canadian human rights activist, from Gitxsan and Wet'suwet'en territory, known for activism for Missing and Murdered Indigenous Women and Girls (MMIWG).

== Early life ==
Radek was born in Witset BC, circa 1955. In 1960, at five-years-old, she and her siblings were taken from their mother in what came to be known as the Sixties Scoop.

== Proving System Racism at BC Human Rights Tribunal ==
In 2001, after witnessing repeated incidents of harassment of her, her friends and other Indigenous peoples by security guards at the International Village mall in downtown Vancouver, she launched a complaint with the BC Human Rights Tribunal. Following a four-year case (Radek v. Henderson Development (Canada) Ltd.,) in which she endured weeks of demeaning commentary from respondents lawyers the B.C. Human Rights Tribunal found the mall, and its security guards had engaged in a pattern of systemic discrimination based on race and disability. Radek was awarded $15,000, which at that time represented the largest-ever damages in a case involving injury to dignity in a systemic discrimination case.

== Missing and Murdered Indigenous Women and Girls ==
In 2005, she became an advocate for MMIWG families following the disappearance of her niece Tamara Lynn Chipman, along the Highway of Tears. In 2006 the first Highway of Tears walk was organized by Radek and Bernie Williams. In 2008, they led the first Walk4Justice, a 4,000-kilometre walk from Vancouver to Parliament Hill in Ottawa to press for a public inquiry into Canada's missing and murdered women. She organized continued cross-Canada walks that played a key role in bringing about the National Inquiry into Missing and Murdered Indigenous Women and Girls in 2016. In 2019 the inquiry came to the conclusion that Canada's policies and actions towards Indigenous women amounted to genocide. She has raised international awarenessof the MMIWG issue and the Highway of Tears in Northern British Columbia through her walks across Canada, and through her vehicle the 'War Pony' displaying the names and pictures of the missing and murdered.

== Awards ==
She was a recipient of the Muriel Duckworth Award for Peace Activism in 2024 and was awarded the King Charles III Coronation Medal in June 2025.
