= Timed comments =

Timed comments are a feature offered by some audio and video players and websites where people can add comments associated with specific times in an audio or video. These comments are then displayed in the player when that time is reached while playing the audio or video.

Timed comments differ from annotations, captions, and subtitles in an important respect: they can be added by viewers, not just video creators, and they include the identity of the person adding the comment.

== Examples ==
- SoundCloud, an audio distribution platform and music sharing website: Timed comments can be added at a specific minute and second mark in a soundtrack, and are displayed when the track reaches that minute and second mark. Users can see each other's comments.
- Viki, a video streaming website that hosts a number of television shows and movies from Korea, Japan, China, and Taiwan. Viki's timed commenting system is one of its distinguishing features.
- Viddler, a video platform used for training videos.
