= Highway of Tears =

Canadian corridor infamous for crimes against women

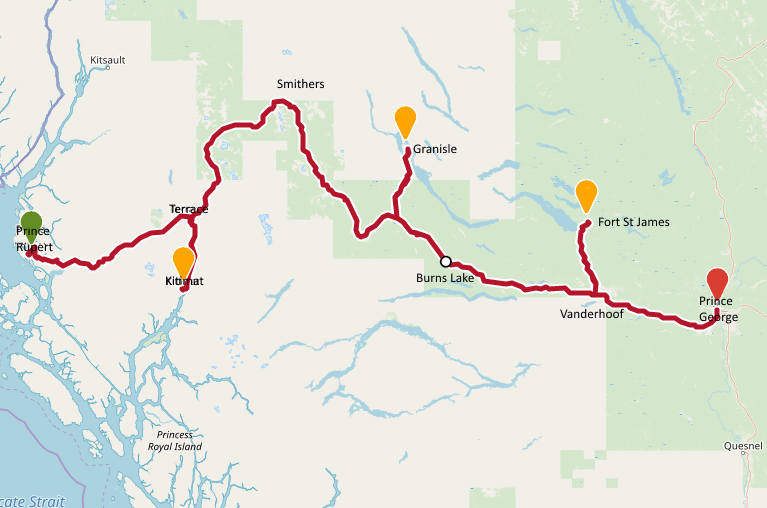
- Highway of Tears corridor including some paved egresses from outlying communities to Highway 16.

Details
- Victims: 80+
- Span of crimes: 1970–present
- Country: Canada
- Locations: Prince George, British Columbia; Prince Rupert, British Columbia

The Highway of Tears is a 719-kilometre (447 mi) corridor of Highway 16 between Prince George and Prince Rupert in British Columbia, Canada, which has been the location of crimes against many women, beginning in 1969 when the highway was completed. The phrase was coined during a vigil held in Terrace, British Columbia in 1998, by Florence Naziel, who was thinking of the victims' families crying over the loss of their loved ones.

There is a disproportionately high number of Indigenous women on the list of victims, hence the association with the Missing and Murdered Indigenous Women (MMIW) movement.

External videos
- B.C.‘s infamous Highway of Tears, CBC Archives, 2:32, 21 June 2006, reported by Miyoung Lee

Proposed explanations for the years-long toleration of the crimes and the limited progress in identifying culprits include poverty, drug abuse, widespread domestic violence, disconnection with traditional culture and disruption of the family unit through the foster care system and Canadian Indian residential school system. Poverty in particular leads to low rates of vehicle ownership and mobility; thus, hitchhiking is often the only way for many to travel vast distances to see family or go to work, school, or seek medical treatment.

The lack of public transportation between communities was at one time a major factor. Another factor leading to unsolved disappearances is that the area is largely isolated and remote. Soft soil in many areas makes burial easier and carnivorous scavengers often carry away human remains. Additionally, before December 2024, much of the highway had no cellular telephone service.

== Victims ==
There is a large proportion of indigenous women among the victims, hence the association with the missing and murdered Indigenous women (MMIW) movement. Accounts vary as to the exact number of victims. According to the RCMP Project E-Pana, the number of victims is fewer than 18, while Indigenous organizations estimate that the number of missing and murdered women is higher than 40. The table below lists all the known women who went missing, were murdered, or died of unknown causes in the Highway of Tears. E-Pana cases are categorized in the table.

Name	Age	Fate	Last location	Year	Circumstances	Developments	Category (E-Pana or not)
Tracey Clifton		Missing	Prince Rupert	1970–1979	The exact date of Clifton's disappearance is unknown. She was last seen leaving her home and walking down Highway 16 after an argument with her mother.		
Helen Claire Frost	17	Missing	Prince George	1970 (October)	Frost left her home in downtown Prince George on the evening of 13 October 1970 and was never seen again. She was living with her sister, Sandy, at the time. Sandy did not report her sister missing until 15 October, thinking at first she might have stayed at a friend's house. Police took a missing persons report, but Sandy said she got the impression that "nothing was done."		
Jean Virginia "Ginny" Sampare	18	Missing	Gitsegukla	1971 (October)	Ginny Sampare went missing on 14 October 1971. Her cousin Alvin was the last person to see her near a bridge on Highway 16 in Gitsegukla. Alvin went home to get a jacket, and returned to find Ginny gone. He reported hearing a pickup door slam as he approached, but did not see the car.		
Monica Ignas	14	Homicide	Thornhill	1974 (December)	Ignas was last seen at 11 PM on 13 December 1974 in Thornhill, walking home in a snowstorm. Two witnesses stated that on that night, they saw a man and girl inside a car parked at the side of the road.	Ignas's body was found in a gravel pit of a densely forested area on 6 April 1975, east of Terrace, near Celgar Forest Service Road.	E-Pana
Coreen Thomas	21	Homicide	Vanderhoof	1976 (July)	Thomas, an Indigenous woman, was struck and killed by a car driven by Richard Redekop, a Canadian man, on 3 July 1976. Thomas and her nine-month-old fetus died. Both Thomas and Redekop were intoxicated during the nighttime collision. According to the police, two underage witnesses told them she was playing chicken with Redekop's car. The witnesses, aged 14 and 16 at the time, claimed they had been coerced into giving those statements. Coroner Eric Turner was removed from the inquest when it was revealed that Redekop was let off with a lesser charge after killing an Indigenous man in a hit and run ten years earlier. Turner also presided over an inquest two years before in the death of Thomas's cousin, who was killed by a vehicle operated by Redekop's younger brother on the same road where she was killed.	Despite the inquiry, the Crown did not proceed with charges. In June 1977, Thomas's father proceeded with criminal negligence charges (which may be laid by private citizens) against Richard Redekop. The charges were dismissed due to insufficient evidence.	
Mary Jane Hill	31	Homicide	Prince Rupert	1978 (March)	Mary Jane Hill was found nude along Highway 16, on 26 March 1978, 34 km (21 mi) from Prince Rupert. Cause of death was determined to be bronchitis and bronchopneumonia as a result of manslaughter.		
Jean Mary Kovacs	36	Homicide	Prince George	1981 (October)	Kovacs' nude body was found in a watery ditch, 40 km east of Prince George on 11 October 1981. Police said she died from a .22 caliber bullet wound to her head. Autopsy reports show she had 4 gunshot wounds to the head. Kovacs was last seen alive at about 1:30 AM on 10 October 1981, at the intersection of the Old Cariboo Highway and Highway 16 East. The first nations woman was found by a man gathering firewood near Purden Lake.	Serial killer Edward Dennis Isaac was charged with the murder of Kovacs in February 1988.	
Roswitha Fuchsbichler	13	Homicide	Prince George	1981 (November)	Fuchsbichler was reported missing at 6:45 PM on 14 November 1981; she last talked to a friend at 2 AM that morning. Fuchsbichler's body was found in a wooded area north of Prince George on 21 November 1981. Edward Dennis Isaac had picked her up hitchhiking and claimed he killed her "to see what it felt like." Her body had been mangled and mutilated but she died from a single stab wound to the heart. Her body had been stripped naked, stabbed and slashed before being dumped.	Serial killer Edward Dennis Isaac was convicted of manslaughter and sentenced on 11 May 1987 to life in prison with no chance of parole for 15 years.	
Nina Marie Joseph	15	Homicide	Prince George	1982 (August)	Nina Joseph's nude body was found on 16 August 1982 in Freeman Park with a cord from her jacket around her neck. Her body had been stripped naked, stabbed and slashed before being dumped.	Serial killer Edward Dennis Isaac was convicted of manslaughter in connection to Nina Joseph's death in June 1986. He was arrested on 7 February 1986 in Fort St. James. Case may have remained unsolved if it wasn't for the testimony of Isaac's ex-girlfriend who helped him dispose of the body.	
Jack family	26	Missing	Prince George	1989 (August)	The Jack family left their home on Strathcona Avenue in Prince George, heading to a logging camp, where they had been offered jobs and daycare for the children. Ronald and Doreen Jack and their two children Russell, 9, and Ryan, 4, were last heard from during the early hours of 2 August 1989, when Ronald called his mother in the Burns Lake area.		
Alberta Gail Williams	24	Homicide	Prince Rupert	1989 (August)	Alberta Williams went missing in the early morning hours of 26 August 1989. She was last seen at Popeye's, a since closed pub in Prince Rupert, by her sister Claudia. Williams had said she was going to a house party. Her naked body was found on 16 September 1989, about 37 km (23 mi) east of Prince Rupert, near the Tyee Overpass. She had been strangled and sexually assaulted. According to the field notes of a RCMP officer, shortly before Williams' body was found, bloody clothes resembling the ones Williams wore the night she went missing were found near the ferry terminal in Prince Rupert. The clothes were seized but likely destroyed. The possibility has been raised that the RCMP didn't take the evidence seriously because her body had not yet been found. A 2006 article indicated that the family wanted Williams to remain off the RCMP Highway of Tears list.		E-Pana
Marnie Blanchard	18	Homicide	Prince George	1989 (November)	Last seen at 2 AM, 22 November 1989, leaving the Rock Pit Cabaret in Prince George. She was last seen entering a grey Toyota pickup truck with a white canopy outside the Rock Pit Cabaret. The driver had black shoulder-length hair. The truck headed west on Second Avenue. Her remains were discovered by cross-country skiers Wilf and Mae Peckham at about 3 PM on 11 December 1989, on an unmarked road west of Foothills Blvd. The remains had been disturbed by animals and were identified by dental and X-ray records.	30 year old serial killer Brian Peter Arp was arrested on 26 July 1990 in relation to Blanchard's murder. Although evidence was obtained, it didn't conclusively prove Arp's guilt and Arp was released. He provided DNA evidence but DNA technology wasn't adequate to determine a match. He was re-arrested for the murder of Marnie Blanchard after being arrested for the murder of Therese Umphrey over two years later. He was convicted of both murders using improved DNA technology.	
Delphine Anne Camelia Nikal	15	Missing	Smithers	1990 (June)	Delphine Nikal vanished on 13 June 1990. She was last seen hitchhiking along Highway 16 and King Street on her way home to Telkwa, BC At approximately 10:00 PM, Nikal called her uncle to tell him that she was on her way home from Smithers. She was last seen by her two friends hitchhiking in the east bound lane of Highway 16. Nikal's cousin, Roberta Nikal, was murdered a few years after Delphine disappeared.		E-Pana
Donna Mae Charlie	22	Homicide	Prince George	1990 (September)	In September 1990, Donna Charlie was reported missing. She came to Prince George from Fort Ware with her boyfriend Jerry Smaaslet. Both were using marijuana, magic mushrooms and drinking. Both checked into the Sportsman's Motel near the time of Charlie's death in early September. The motel owner, Richard Hunter, testified that on Saturday, the motel room was a shambles and there was blood on the walls. On 17 April 1991, the police located her headless body buried in a shallow grave in a vacant lot, near the Sportsman's Motel. Smaaslet testified that the body was buried some time after her death in a vacant lot across from the Ingledew playground. Smaaslet's cousin Sheryl Girroir and a younger male cousin helped bury the body. Charlie's head was not found at the time, but Smaaslet testified that he buried it on Connaught Hill.	In May 1991, Jerry Smaaslet was charged with the murder. It was determined in trial that Smaaslet murdered Charlie in early September 1990, behind the Sportsman's Motel on Queensway. Smaaslet claimed that he found Charlie behind the motel looking very blue colored. During the trial, two witnesses testified that Smaaslet told them he mutilated Charlie while she was still alive. Defense lawyer Larry Walker said "Smaaslet had a good upbringing and was a good candidate for rehabilitation." A jury convicted Smaaslet of second-degree murder, but the conviction was overturned by the Court of Appeal and a new trial ordered. In May 1995, Smaaslet pled guilty to manslaughter and served an additional year to the 38 months served already. Smaalset was arrested again in 2001 for another incident involving a woman and a hotel room and was sentenced as a dangerous offender for an indefinite period. Charlie's head was found in October 2022 on Connaught Hill by a member of the public.	
Therese Umphrey	38	Homicide	Prince George	1993 (February)	Umphrey was last seen intoxicated outside of a convenience store in Prince George on 14 February 1993. Some men reported giving her a ride, but when she couldn't remember where she lived, they drove her back to the convenience store. Her nude, partially frozen body was found on a snowbank about 50 km southwest of Prince George at about 2:30 PM on 14 February 1993. The forensic pathologist who performed the autopsy reported that her death was caused by manual strangulation and then strangulation with a ligature similar to a shoelace found at the scene.	Serial killer Brian Peter Arp was arrested on 4 October 1993 and later convicted in the murder of Therese Umphrey and Marnie Blanchard. He applied for an appeal in 1998 and it was subsequently denied.	
Ramona Lisa Wilson	16	Homicide	Smithers	1994 (June)	She was hitchhiking from Smithers to attend a dance and stay with friends in Hazelton, BC on 11 June 1994. Wilson's remains were found April 1995 north of Yellich Road near the Smithers Airport. Several items were in a small organized pile a few feet away. Other objects nearby included a half-buried small section of rope, three interlocking nylon ties and a small pink "brass knuckles" type water pistol.	In June 1995, the Wilson family began the annual Ramona Lisa Wilson Memorial Walk which also includes the family, friends and supporters of other MMIW. Wilson's story was featured in the 2006 documentary Finding Dawn, the 2015 documentary Highway of Tears and the 2020 VPRO special Highway of Tears with Dutch reporter Emy Koopman.	E-Pana
Roxanne Thiara	15	Homicide	Burns Lake	1994 (July)	Thiara went missing in Prince George on the July long weekend in 1994. She worked as a sex worker and had told a friend that she was going out with a customer. She walked around the corner of a building and was never heard from again. Her body was found 17 August 1994, in the bush along Highway 16, 6 km (3.7 mi) east of Burns Lake. She also knew victim Alisha Germaine.		E-Pana
Alisha 'Leah' Germaine	15	Homicide	Prince George	1994 (December)	Germaine was found murdered on 9 December 1994, behind Haldi Road Elementary School off of Highway 16 W. outside of Prince George. She had been stabbed to death. She also knew victim Roxanne Thiara.		E-Pana
Lana Derrick	19	Missing	Thornhill	1995 (October)	Derrick was last seen in October 1995 at a service station in Thornhill. One rumor said she had gotten into a car with two unidentified men.		E-Pana
Nicole Hoar	24	Missing	Prince George	2002 (June)	Nicole Hoar was last seen hitchhiking to Smithers. Originally from Red Deer, Alberta, Hoar was last seen at a gas station at 5952 Gauthier Road, west of Prince George, on 21 June 2002 at approximately 2:50 PM. She was seen walking towards an orange car driven by a Caucasian man, but was not seen entering the vehicle.	Police investigated convicted murderer Leland Vincent Switzer and searched his Isle Pierre property but no further actions followed the investigation.	E-Pana
Mary Madeline George	31	Missing	Prince George	2005 (July)	George was reportedly walking to a clinic in Prince George when she was last seen on 24 July 2005 at 6 PM.		
Tamara Lynn Chipman	22	Missing	Prince Rupert	2005 (September)	Chipman was last seen in Prince Rupert on 21 September 2005, at about 4:30 PM, while hitchhiking east on Highway 16 near the Rupert Industrial Park. It is believed that she was trying to get back to her home. Chipman was first reported missing by her father in November 2005, with the Terrace and Rupert RCMP launching a joint investigation on 15 November. Search efforts were aided by family, friends and volunteers and involved searching every logging road between Rupert and Terrace. A brief search was also done in Vancouver's Downtown Eastside.		E-Pana
Aielah Katherina Saric-Auger	14	Homicide	Prince George	2006 (February)	The body of Aielah Saric-Auger, 14, was found 10 February 2006, shortly after she went missing on 2 February 2006. After going to the mall with her brother and sister, Saric-Auger went to a friend's house for a sleepover. Overnight, she was spotted walking north, in the 2100 block of Quince Street. Video surveillance shows Saric-Auger walking towards her home and passing the Save-On-Foods gas bar at 100–1600 15th Avenue at around 1 AM. It was reported that she was last seen getting into a black van. A motorist found Saric-Auger in a ditch near a turn off on Highway 16 near Tabor Mountain, nearly 20 km (12 mi) east of Prince George.		E-Pana
Bonnie Marie Joseph	32	Missing	Vanderhoof	2007 (September)	Joseph, a mother of five, was last seen in Vanderhoof on the afternoon of 8 September 2007 by her cousin Joanne. She was seen hitchhiking from Vanderhoof to Prince George, where she had a court date the next day. Joseph was nearing the end of a series of court dates to get her children back from the government, and never missed a single court date until 9 September. She was reported missing in December 2007 by her aunt Rose Joseph. Police say she led a high-risk lifestyle and was known to hitchhike alone between Fort St. James, Vanderhoof, and Prince George. Her family considers her disappearance to be out of character. According to her cousin Vanessa Joseph, before Bonnie was reported missing and after she was last seen, her wallet and ID were found near a lake with an un-cashed cheque still in it. It was turned in to the RCMP, who reported this discovery to Bonnie Joseph's sister Sharon a year later.		
Jill Stacey Stuchenko	35	Homicide	Prince George	2009 (October)	Stuchenko's body was found in October 2009 in a gravel pit on the outskirts of Prince George. She had died from multiple blows to the head. Stuchenko was known to be engaged in sex work. She left behind five children.	Cody Legebokoff was arrested on 27 November 2010 and convicted of first-degree murder on 11 September 2014. Legebokoff was also convicted of first-degree murder in the deaths of Loren Donn Leslie, Cynthia Frances Maas, and Natasha Lynn Montgomery. In September 2016 the BC Court of Appeal confirmed the original conviction. Legebokoff was 20 years old when he was arrested.	
Emmalee Rose McLean	16	Unknown	Prince Rupert	2010 (April)	McLean's body was found by a passerby on the afternoon of Saturday, 10 April 2010. Her body was found partially submerged in the Prince Rupert harbour between Northwest Fuels barge and Ocean Royal fish plant. It was reported that McLean was with people the night before, when she was last seen alive. It was also reported that "[t]he people she was with that night, ... were not people she could trust 100 per cent. Some she could trust, but not all of them.." An autopsy was performed, with preliminary findings indicating cause of death as drowning. Although the police have not called this a homicide, they have stated that they have not ruled out foul play.		
Natasha Lynn Montgomery	23	Homicide	Prince George	2010 (August)	Montgomery was last heard from 26 August 2010 when she called her parents to "touch base." She was known to be engaged in sex work. Montgomery's body was never found, but her DNA was discovered on serial killer Cody Legebokoff's shorts, hoodie, axe, and throughout his apartment.	Cody Legebokoff was arrested on 27 November 2010 and convicted of first-degree murder on 11 September 2014. Legebokoff was also convicted of first-degree murder in the deaths of Loren Donn Leslie, Jill Stacey Stuchenko, Cynthia Frances Maas and Natasha Lynn Montgomery. In September 2016 the BC Court of Appeal confirmed the original conviction. Legebokoff was age 20 when he was arrested.	
Cynthia Frances Maas	35	Homicide	Prince George	2010 (September)	The remains of Cynthia Frances Maas were found in LC Gunn Park, near Prince George, on 9 October 2010 at approximately 2 AM. She was last seen on 10 September in the area of Juniper Street and 19 Avenue in Prince George. She was reported missing by family members and friends on 23 September after she failed to check in with them. Maas was known to be engaged in sex work. She was discovered by RCMP Corporal Kent MacNeil. She died from blunt force trauma and penetrating wounds to the chest. Maas had defense wounds and her pants were rolled down to her ankles. Her head was almost completely skeletonized and detached from her neck at time of discovery.	Cody Legebokoff was arrested on 27 November 2010 by RCMP officer Aaron Kehler. Legebokoff was convicted of first-degree murder on 11 September 2014. Legebokoff was also convicted of first-degree murder in the deaths of Loren Donn Leslie, Jill Stacey Stuchenko, Cynthia Frances Maas and Natasha Lynn Montgomery. In September 2016 the BC Court of Appeal confirmed the original conviction. Legebokoff was age 20 when he was arrested.	
Loren Donn Leslie	15	Homicide	Vanderhoof	2010 (November)	Leslie was an acquaintance of serial killer Cody Legebokoff, whom she met online Her body was found in November 2010 on a remote logging road just off Highway 27 near Fort St. James. When Legebokoff was pulled over by police on 27 November 2010, he was in possession of Leslie's belongings and covered in Leslie's blood.	Cody Legebokoff was arrested on 27 November 2010 by RCMP officer Aaron Kehler. Legebokoff was convicted of first-degree murder on 11 September 2014. On 11 September 2014, Canadian serial killer Cody Legebokoff was convicted of first-degree murder in the deaths of Loren Donn Leslie, Jill Stacey Stuchenko, Cynthia Frances Maas and Natasha Lynn Montgomery. In September 2016 the BC Court of Appeal confirmed the original conviction. Legebokoff was age 20 when he was arrested.	
Madison "Maddy" Geraldine Scott	20	Homicide	Vanderhoof	2011 (May)	Madison Scott went missing during the early morning hours of 28 May 2011 at Hogsback Lake, 25 km (16 mi) southeast of Vanderhoof. Scott vanished after attending a party at Hogsback Lake with a friend, Jordi Bolduc. According to her own testimony, Bolduc left Scott there because Bolduc was drunk and injured, and Scott, already settled in for the night, didn't want to leave her sleeping bag. Scott last communicated with others at the party around 4 AM and was never heard from again. Her remains were discovered on a property east of Vanderhoof, nearly twelve years after her disappearance; the identification was announced on 29 May 2023.		
Destiny Rae Tom	21	Homicide	Fraser Lake	2013 (March)	Tom was found dead on 23 March 2013, outside a home on the Nadleh Whut'en First Nation in Northern BC. She had been severely beaten. Tom left behind one daughter.	In February 2015, Garrett Steven George was charged with second-degree murder. George had a criminal record that included convictions for assault, assault with a weapon, and assault causing bodily harm in Burns Lake and Prince George.	
Anita Florence Thorne	49	Missing	Prince George	2014 (November)	Thorne was reported missing on the evening of Wednesday, 19 November 2014, at 8:15 PM. She was last seen that morning at SuperSave Gas at 950 Victoria Street, then at a nearby Tim Horton's. RCMP found her car midday of the 20th at the turn off to Willow River, 30 km away from where she was last seen. Her purse was inside the unlocked vehicle and visible, with nothing apparently missing.		
Roberta (Robin) Marie Sims	55	Homicide	Prince George	2017 (May)	Sims, 55, was last seen by numerous witnesses on Saturday, 6 May 2017 near her home at 3015–3rd Ave., across from Central Fort George Traditional School. She may have also been seen at the BX Pub at Fifth and Carney and at the Spruceland CIBC bank around the time she went missing, RCMP said. Sims was reported missing on Sunday, 14 May 2017. RCMP stated that they believe Sims' vehicle was used in her murder.		
Jessica Patrick (Balczer)	18	Homicide	Smithers	2018 (September)	Patrick was last seen at the Smithers McDonald's or the Mountainview Motel, early 31 August 2018. Patrick was reported missing on 3 September and an RCMP news release was put out three days later on 6 September. News of her death was released on 16 September 2018, before police officially released identity of human remains found. RCMP officially released the identity of the remains found on 21 September 2018. According to RCMP, Patrick's body was found on Hudson Bay Mountain Road at a large pull-out, about 15 metres down a steep bank on Saturday, 15 September 2018.		
Cynthia Martin	50	Unknown	Hazelton	2018 (December)	Martin was last seen on 23 December 2018 at about 9:00 PM. Family and friends consider her disappearance to be out of character, though RCMP said there was nothing to indicate foul play. The vehicle she was last seen driving was found locked near the Hagwilget Bridge, near Hazelton. Members of Smither's-based Bulkley Valley Search and Rescue carried out an air search over the area on 25 December 2018 with helicopter assistance, but didn't find any trace of Martin. Martin's remains were found on 1 May 2022, and were identified on 9 August 2022.		
Lawrence Maitland	42	Homicide	Lax Kwalaams	2019 (July)	Lawrence Maitland, a First Nations man from Lax Kw'alaams, British Columbia, was reported missing in July 2019 after last being seen between 17 and 18 July 2019, on Victoria Street in Lax Kw'alaams at approximately 2 p.m.. His disappearance was considered suspicious at the time, prompting the RCMP North District Major Crime Unit to launch an investigation; on 27 November 2025, human remains discovered in the Indigenous community of Lax Kw'alaams were positively identified by the BC Coroners Service as Maitland's after a specialized search involving Prince Rupert Ground Search and Rescue, Terrace Search and Rescue, and logistical support from the Lax Kw'alaams Fire Department, and the RCMP stated that investigators continue to examine the circumstances surrounding his disappearance and death.		
Laureen Campbell Fabian	69	Missing	Houston	2019 (October)	Fabian left her home on foot for a walk around noon on 28 October 2019. She went missing from around the Buck Flats area, south of Houston. A search followed that involved SAR ground crews from Smithers and Terrace, RCMP canine units, a plane, and an RCMP helicopter. No trace of Fabian was found, and the search was called off on 2 November 2019.		
Cassandra Kale	28	Homicide	Vanderhoof	2020 (May)	On Sunday, 3 May 2020 at 8:30 PM, RCMP pulled over a vehicle on Highway 16, near Landaluza Road, west of Vanderhoof. Police noticed a dead woman in the back seat of the vehicle and arrested the other two occupants. RCMP believe that all three occupants, including the deceased, were known to each other. RCMP said the death is suspicious. Foul play was never publicly ruled out.		
Crystal Haynes Chambers	34	Homicide	Prince George	2020 (August)	Chambers' remains were found on the afternoon of Saturday, 1 August 2020, near Highway 16. An autopsy revealed that Chamber's death was the result of homicide.	Jason Troy Getty was arrested on 17 December 2021 in Surrey BC. He was charged with one count of second-degree murder and one count of indignity to human remains in relation to the death of Crystal Chambers.	
Chelsey Amanda Quaw (Heron)	29	Homicide	Vanderhoof	2023 (October)	Quaw was a member of the Saik'uz First Nation and was last seen at her residence on 11 October 2023. Her disappearance was preceded by the disappearance of another Saik'uz member, Jay Preston Raphael. Quaw's remains were found on 7 November 2023 in a wooded area on the community's territory.		

== Investigation and suspects ==
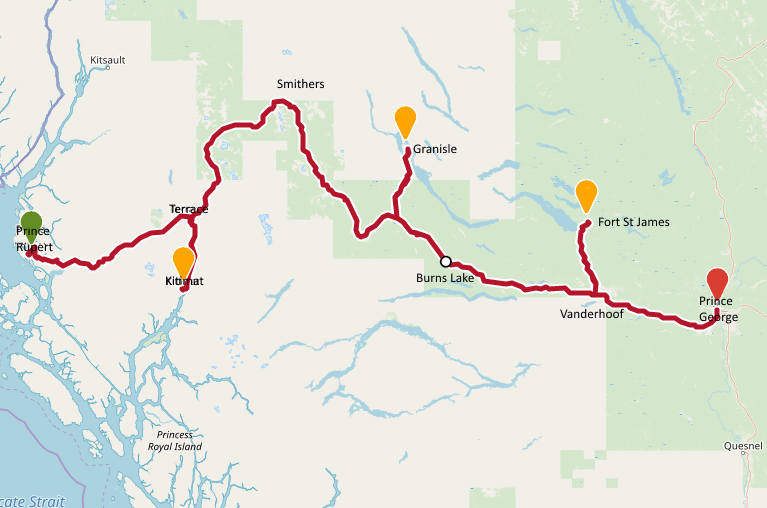
Highway of Tears corridor, including some paved egresses from outlying communities to Highway 16.

The first investigation by RCMP that tried to look at Highway of Tears as linked cases was opened in December 1998. However, the list of cases as it existed back then included three additional male victims – Larry Vu, Eric Charles Coss, and Phillip Innes Fraser. To date, a number of people have been convicted in cases related to the Highway of Tears. Three serial killers are among those charged: Brian Peter Arp, Edward Dennis Isaac, and Cody Legebokoff.

Although he was not publicly implicated in any Highway of Tears cases, Bobby Jack Fowler was implicated in numerous non-Highway-of-Tears E-Pana cases. Fowler died in prison and has never been charged in the deaths of any of the Highway of Tears victims. It is possible that Fowler was linked to the Highway of Tears cases because he worked for a now closed Prince George company called Happy's Roofing in 1974, which was the same year that Monica Ignas went missing in Terrace, BC. Former Vancouver police geographic profiler Kim Rossmo is on the record having said that in his opinion Fowler is not responsible for any of the crimes along Highway 16 between 1989 and 2006.

In 2009, police converged on a property in Isle Pierre, in rural Prince George, to search for the remains of Nicole Hoar, a young tree planter who went missing on Highway 16 on 21 June 2002. The property was once owned by Leland "Chuggy" Vincent Switzer, who served a prison sentence for the second-degree murder of his brother and is out on day parole as of late 2016. The RCMP also searched the property for the other missing women from the Highway of Tears; however, no further actions followed the investigation.

RCMP Sgt. Wayne Clary said they may never solve all of the cases and that it will be the "people in the communities that are going to solve these crimes." They do have persons of interest in several cases, but not enough evidence to lay charges.

== B.C. government email scandal ==
In an official government report, ministerial assistant George Gretes was accused of being irresponsible for "triple deleting" all emails relating to the Highway of Tears from the email account of Tim Duncan, former executive assistant to Transportation Minister Todd Stone.

On 22 October 2015, Elizabeth Denham, the Information and Privacy Commissioner of British Columbia, published a 65-page report outlining how B.C. government officials had "triple deleted" emails relating to the Highway of Tears.

In her report Access Denied, Denham describes the act of "triple deleting" as transferring an email to the "deleted" folder on a computer system, deleting the email from the folder and then overriding the backup that permits the system to retrieve deleted items. By deleting these files, Denham states the government had breached the Freedom of Information and Protection of Privacy Act. Denham became aware of the scandal in May 2015 after she received a letter from Tim Duncan, the former executive assistant to Transportation Minister Todd Stone. Duncan claimed that as he was responding to an FOI (Freedom of Information) application, ministerial assistant George Gretes ordered for Duncan to search his records for any files pertaining to the Highway of Tears and missing women.

Once the files were located, Duncan testified that Gretes ordered for them to be deleted. When Duncan hesitated, Gretes allegedly took the keyboard and "triple deleted" all of the emails relating to the Highway of Tears.

According to Denham, Gretes originally denied this claim but later admitted to the triple deletion during a second police interview. Denham states that Gretes—who resigned from his job in October 2015—would have then lied under oath. A year earlier, in the summer of 2014, a team from the Transportation Ministry toured Highway 16 and conducted numerous meetings with Aboriginal leaders and communities.

The significance of this project was to produce safer travel solutions for women living along Highway 16, many of whom had turned to hitchhiking as a way of transportation. In November 2014, the NDP made the FOI request seeking all government files pertaining to missing women, the Highway of Tears and meetings arranged by the ministry: the report Duncan would later respond to. Despite a two-month tour and multiple meetings, the B.C. government claimed the FOI request produced no files relating to the Highway of Tears.

According to Denham's report, these records did exist until government officials destroyed them in order to "skirt freedom of information laws". In Access Denied, Denham called upon the RCMP to further investigate the triple deletion of government files.

In November 2015, Vancouver lawyer Mark Jetté was appointed as special prosecutor within the RCMP investigation. Jetté will act as the RCMP's independent legal adviser as well as administer an independent assessment of the evidence. He will also pursue any criminal charges that may be found appropriate. Gretes was convicted of one count of lying to the British Columbia privacy commissioner and fined $2,500.

== Project E-Pana ==
=== History ===
In 2005, the RCMP launched a provincially funded project, E-Pana, which started with a focus on some of the unsolved murders and disappearances of female children and young women along Highway 16. E-Pana sought to discover if there was a single serial killer at work or a multitude of killers operating along the highway. The unit started with 3 cases in 2005, then the unit investigated 9 cases in 2006, but by 2007, its caseload had doubled to 18 and its geographical scope began spanning large parts of the province and not just the Highway of Tears.

The victims involved within the E-Pana investigation followed the criteria of being female, participating in a high-risk lifestyle, known to hitchhike, and were last seen or their bodies were discovered within a mile from Highway 16, Highway 97, and Highway 5. In the 2009/2010 year, E-Pana received over $5 million in annual funding but has since declined due to budget cutbacks; receiving only $806,109 for the 2013/2014 year.

In 2013, Craig Callens, the RCMP deputy commissioner, warned that further budget reductions from the provincial government would greatly affect the Highway of Tears investigations; however, he didn't say this would affect the E-Pana cases which aren't Highway of Tears.

A 2014 freedom-of-information request stated that the task force had dropped from 70 officers to 12 officers since 2010.

=== Specific cases ===
E-Pana is responsible for linking the homicide of 16-year-old Colleen MacMillen, who was killed in 1974, with the now-deceased American criminal Bobby Jack Fowler. E-Pana now considers Fowler a suspect in the murders of two other highway victims, Gale Weys and Pamela Darlington, both of whom were killed in the 1970s.

In 2014, investigations by E-Pana and the Provincial Unsolved Homicide Unit brought murder charges against Garry Taylor Handlen for the death of 12-year-old Monica Jack in 1978.

He was found guilty by jury and sentenced to life in prison in early 2019, thus Monica Jack's murder becomes the first file in Project E-Pana to officially be solved with full court proceedings and sentence. E-Pana is still investigating the remaining unsolved cases, although it is unlikely that all will be solved.

== Accusations of racism ==
Some critics argue that the lack of results arising from this investigation is the result of systemic racism. This was also reported to be an issue in the case of Vancouver's missing women and the Robert Pickton murders. Activists argue that media coverage of these cases has been limited, claiming that "media assign a lesser value to aboriginal women."

Furthermore, despite the fact that these disappearances date back as far as 1970, it was not until 2005 that an RCMP task force was launched to look into similarities between the cases. Nicole Hoar, a white woman who disappeared in 2002, received a disproportionate amount of media attention at the time of her disappearance.

Hers was the first of the Highway of Tears cases to be covered in The Globe and Mail, Vancouver Sun, and Edmonton Journal. Gladys Radek, a native activist and the aunt of victim Tamara Chipman, "believes that if it weren't for Hoar, the police would have invested less effort in investigating cases, and the media would have done little, if anything, to inform the public about the tragedies along the road."

== Recommendation reports ==
Numerous municipalities and 23 First Nations communities border the Highway of Tears. The rural region is plagued with poverty and lacks public transportation; many residents turn to hitchhiking as a form of transit or partake in high risk lifestyles to survive. Poverty and a lack of public transit has forced many disadvantaged Aboriginal women to turn to hitchhiking as a cheap means of transportation along Highway 16. Many of the Highway of Tears victims were last seen or reported to be hitchhiking before their disappearances.

In March 2006, various Aboriginal groups hosted a two-day Highway of Tears symposium at the CN Center in Prince George. In attendance to the event were the victim's families and over 500 Aboriginal leaders from across British Columbia. Shortly thereafter, the Highway of Tears Symposium Recommendation Report was issued with 33 recommendations to improve public transit, deter hitchhiking, and prevent violence towards Aboriginal women.

Some of the recommendations from the report include a shuttle bus operation along Highway 16, improved educational, health and social services for Aboriginal people as well counseling and mental health groups organized by Aboriginal workers. These propositions are part of a long-term recommendation to directly confront the issue of First Nations inter-generational poverty.

The Highway of Tears Symposium Recommendation Report was endorsed by B.C. inquiry commissioner Wally Oppal in his 2012 Missing Women Commission of Inquiry recommendations. Oppal's public inquiry report into the Robert Pickton case demanded urgent transportation improvement along Highway 16.

On 24 November 2015, the First Nations Health Authority and B.C. Ministry of Transportation and Infrastructure held the Northern Transportation Symposium in Smithers, British Columbia. The symposium included Aboriginal communities and municipalities along Highway 16 and focused on the issue of medical and non-medical transportation in those regions. Discussions included and expanded upon the 2006 Highway of Tears Symposium Recommendation Report and the 2012 Missing Women Commission of Inquiry recommendations.

In June 2016, Transportation Minister Todd Stone announced that as the result of collaboration across local communities, a bus service would become available along Highway 16. The project will be joint funded by the federal government and the government of British Columbia. In June 2017, a subsidized transit service began operations on alternating days along a 400 kilometres (250 mi) section between Prince George and Burns Lake.

The Highway of Tears Symposium Recommendation Report also suggested improving cellular coverage along the entire length of the highway to eliminate dead zones. On 30 December 2024, Rogers installed five 5G cell towers along the highway to close a gap in cell service along a 166 kilometre stretch between Prince Rupert and Prince George.

== Media and awareness efforts ==
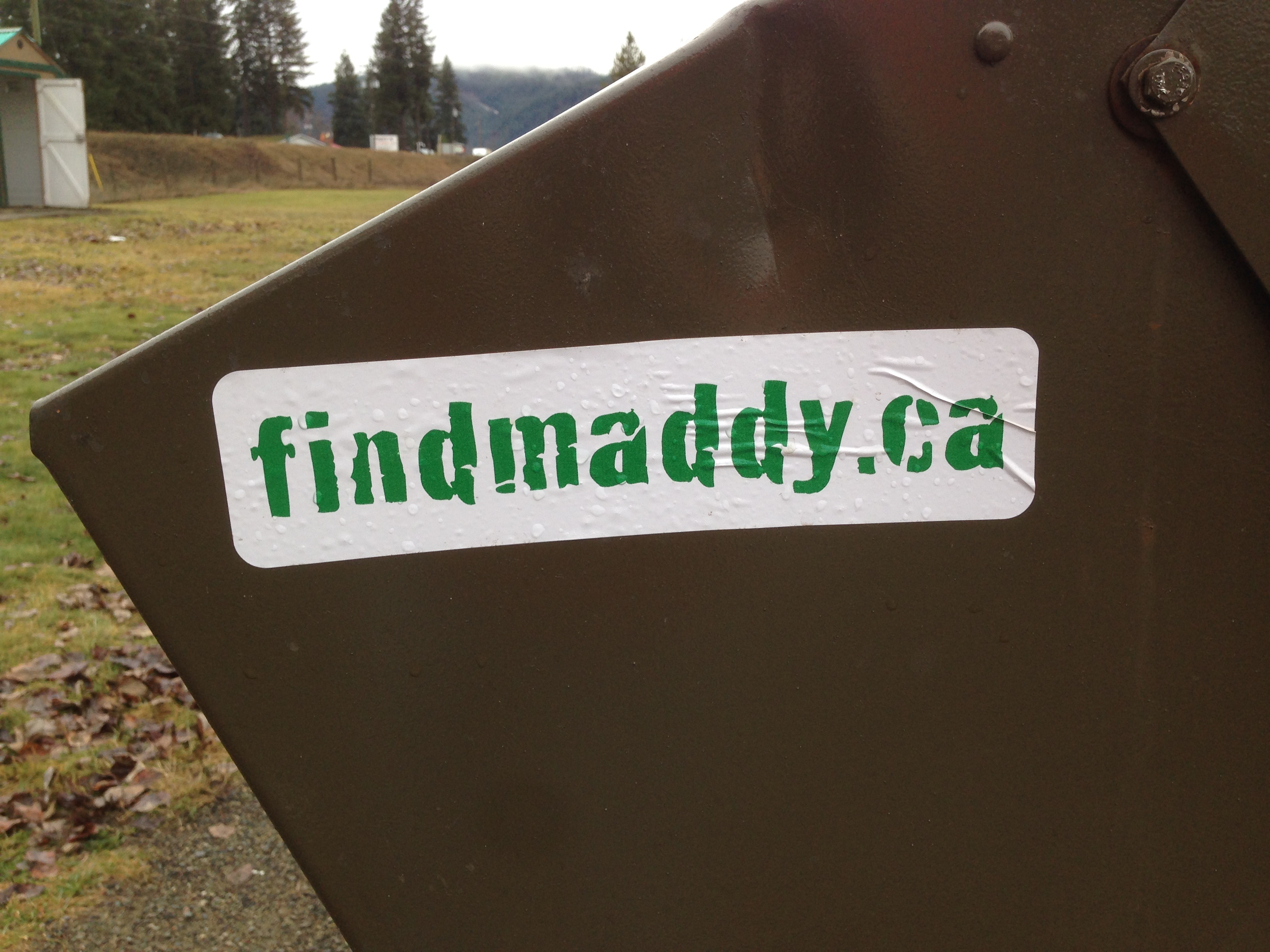
Awareness campaign for Madison Scott, missing in 2011 along the Highway of Tears.

- Highway of Tears totem pole raised by family of Tamara Chipman in Kitsumkalum, 4 September 2020.
- SERIAL KILLER: Highway of Tears is a Crime Junkie podcast episode that was broadcast 15 December 2019.
- Finding Dawn (2006) is a documentary film by Métis filmmaker Christine Welsh, about 16-year-old Ramona Wilson, one of the victims found alongside the highway. Welsh's documentary highlights the reality that Aboriginal women face today: in the past 30 years, an estimated 500 Aboriginal women have gone missing or have been murdered in Canada. Welsh uncovers the social, economic, and historical factors that contribute to this statistic. The film can be accessed online on the Nation Film Board web page.
- 48 Hours: "Highway of Tears" (season 25, episode 7), about the Highway of Tears murders, airdate 17 November 2012.
- Highway of Tears (March 2014), an 80-minute documentary by Canadian filmmakers Matthew Smiley and Carly Pope, narrated by Canadian actor Nathan Fillion. The documentary, which was featured in numerous film festivals, raises awareness about the stretch of highway and missing women. In a 2014 interview with CBC, Smiley said that during the editing of the film "over 400 [indigenous] women were estimated to be missing and or murdered across Canada. By the time we premiered the film, the number was over 600 in March of 2014, then the numbers increased to 900 and now over 1,200 missing and murdered indigenous women across Canada. We cannot turn a blind eye to this."
- Searchers: The Highway of Tears (2015), a mini-series produced by the online newscast VICE, highlights the story of various Aboriginal women who have disappeared along the Highway of Tears and brings attention to the family, friends, and detectives fighting for justice. VICE also offers online articles pertaining to the Highway of Tears murders and disappearances.
- Canada's Missing & Murdered Aboriginal Women is a series of 14 short episodes, aired on CBC's flagship news program The National. The series is accessible at The National's YouTube channel, under the playlist Canada's Missing & Murdered Aboriginal Women.
- That Lonely Section of Hell: The Botched Investigation of a Serial Killer Who Almost Got Away (13 October 2015), is a memoir for which its author, Lorimer Shenher, was nominated for the B.C. Book Prize. Shenher writes from the perspective of a former reporter and the first police detective to be assigned to the case of the missing women. They also cover the police culture in detail.
- The Stacey Dooley Investigates episode entitled "Canada’s Lost Girls", first broadcast on 7 March 2017, where Dooley met the family of Amber Tuccaro, who went missing in 2010 aged 20.

== See also ==
- 2022 Winnipeg serial killings
- Canadian Indian residential school system
- Ghosts of Highway 20
- Ministry of Children and Family Development (British Columbia)
- Missing and Murdered Indigenous Women
- Saskatoon freezing deaths
- Sixties Scoop
- Prostitution on Native American Reservations in North America, United States
- Truth and Reconciliation Commission of Canada
- Texas Killing Fields
