= Pana (mythology) =

Inuit underworld god

In Inuit mythology, Panna (or Pavna), also called the "woman up there", was the goddess who cared for souls in the underworld (Qudlivun) before they were reincarnated. Pana resides in the starry sky and is associated with the Northern Lights.

== Functions ==
The Inuit believe in a three-tiered world: the Underworld (Adlivun), where evil spirits reside (and alternately where the newly dead must spend a year being purified before being able to enter the Upper World); the Earth, where mortal souls face the harsh elements; and the Upper World (Qudlivun), where the soul resides while awaiting reincarnation.

Pana is often considered a deity residing in the starry skies. Her task is to watch over souls transported from the Middle World (Earth) to the Upper Realms (Heaven). See here the Greenlandic Inuit word for up there. There, Pana cares for the souls until they are ready for reincarnation and are once again sent back to Earth for rebirth.

When a soul is ready to reincarnate, Pana is assisted by the Moon God, Anningan, who cannot shine during this time, which is why the moon falls into a dark stage.
