= Bobby Jack Fowler =

American criminal (1939–2006)

- Fowler's booking photo in Lincoln County, Oregon, 1995
- Born: Robert Jack Fowler; June 12, 1939; Merkel, Texas, U.S.
- Died: May 20, 2006 (aged 66); Oregon State Penitentiary, Salem, Oregon, U.S.
- Occupation: Construction worker
- Spouse: Theresa Louise Patton (1959–1971)
- Children: 5
- Convictions: Rape; Attempted kidnapping Arson; Attempted rape Attempted murder Discharging a firearm within city limits
- Penalty: 16 years and 3 months imprisonment

Details
- Victims: 1–20+
- Span of crimes: 1973 – 1995 (confirmed); 1969 – 1995 (possible)
- Country: United States and Canada
- States: Oregon and British Columbia, possible active in other states in the United States and Canada
- Date apprehended: June 28, 1995

Bobby Jack Fowler (June 12, 1939 – May 20, 2006) was an American rapist, murderer, and suspected serial killer who was active in the United States and Canada from 1973 to 1995. He died in prison of lung cancer during a 16-year sentence following a conviction for rape, kidnapping and attempted rape in Newport, Oregon, in 1996 (for an attack that took place in 1995).

== Biography and early life ==
=== Childhood ===
Bobby Jack Fowler was born June 12, 1939, to Selva “Mutt” Fowler and Oma Lee (Hathaway) Fowler. His older brother, Walter was born in 1934, and his younger sister, Susan was born in 1950; both died in 2004, two years before his death. His parents allegedly physically abused him and his siblings during their childhood.

=== Marriage ===
On March 6, 1959, Fowler married Theresa Patton and had five children: Johnny, Janey, Pam, Loretta and Randell. He and Theresa divorced on May 17, 1971.

== Known crimes and modus operandi ==
Fowler was a transient construction worker who is known to have traveled extensively across North America. He spent time "rabbiting around" North America to such places as British Columbia, Florida, Iowa, Louisiana, Texas, Oregon, South Carolina, Arizona, Tennessee and Washington state. During his travels he developed an extensive criminal record and is known to have committed several violent crimes. As an alcohol, amphetamine, and methamphetamine abuser, Fowler had a criminal record that included attempted murder, sexual assault, and firearms offenses.

In 1969, he was charged with murdering a man and woman in Texas, but was only convicted of discharging a firearm within city limits.

In 1972, Fowler also spent time in a Tennessee prison for sexual assault and attempted murder because, in the words of an investigator, "he tied [a woman] up, beat the hell out of her with her own belt, covered her with brush and left her to die."

He liked to travel far and wide in beat-up old cars, frequently picked up hitchhikers, and spent time in bars and motels. Fowler believed that women he came into contact with who were hitchhiking and hanging out in bars wanted to be sexually assaulted.

== Suspected crimes ==
Fowler is a suspect or person of interest in at least 16 murders in British Columbia and Oregon dating as far back as 1969.

=== Project E-Pana ===
Fowler was a suspect under the focus of RCMP project E-Pana. His supposed DNA was found on the body of Colleen MacMillen. Fowler is also strongly suspected to have killed both Gale Weys and Pamela Darlington in 1973. The Royal Canadian Mounted Police believe that he may have also killed as many as ten of the other victims, and possibly as many as 20.

Potential Canadian victims include those murdered and missing along the Highway of Tears. However, many of these murders occurred after Fowler's imprisonment in 1996 and geographic profiler Kim Rossmo is on the record, pointing out that Fowler was not responsible for any of the deaths along Highway 16 between 1989 and 2006. It is possible that the only thing linking Fowler to Highway 16 is that he worked for a now closed Prince George roofing company, Happy's Roofing, in 1974.

=== Other murders ===
On May 3, 1992, around 1:00 a.m., Sheila Swanson, 19, and Melissa Sanders, 17, were last seen making a call from a payphone near the Beverly Beach State Park where they had been camping. Their bodies were later discovered on October 10, 1992, by hunters in a wooded area near Eddyville, Oregon.

== Arrest and investigation ==
On June 28, 1995, Fowler was arrested following an incident in Newport, Oregon, which involved a woman jumping out of a second floor window at the Tides Inn Motel with a rope still tied to her ankle. She survived the attack and reported the incident to the local police.

On January 8, 1996, Fowler was convicted of kidnapping in the first degree, attempted rape in the first degree, sexual abuse in the first degree, coercion, assault in the fourth degree, and menacing. He was sentenced to 195 months (16 years, 3 months) with the possibility of parole.

On September 25, 2012, the Royal Canadian Mounted Police and Lincoln County District Attorney Rob Bovett named Bobby Jack Fowler as a suspect in three of the E-Pana murders. His supposed DNA was found on the body of Colleen MacMillen, one of the presumed victims.

== Death ==
In May 2006, Fowler died at the age of 66 in Oregon State Penitentiary from lung cancer. His body was cremated.

== See also ==
- List of serial killers in the United States
