= Cody Legebokoff =

Canadian serial killer (born 1990)

Cody Alan Legebokoff
- Born: Cody Alan Legebokoff; 21 January 1990 (age 36); Fort St. James, British Columbia, Canada
- Other names: Highway of Tears Killer, Country Boy
- Conviction: First-degree murder (4 counts)
- Penalty: Four life sentences with possibility of parole after 25 years

Details
- Victims: 4
- Span of crimes: 2009–2010
- Country: Canada
- Location: Prince George
- Date apprehended: November 27, 2010
- Imprisoned at: Warkworth Institution

Cody Alan Legebokoff (born 21 January 1990) is a Canadian serial killer convicted in 2014 by the Supreme Court of British Columbia of murdering three women and one teenage girl, between 2009 and 2010, in or near the city of Prince George, British Columbia. He is one of Canada's youngest convicted serial killers, and his trial drew national attention. One of his victims, the 23-year-old Natasha Lynn Montgomery, has been included in the list of missing women and girls suspected as victims in the Highway of Tears murders.

== Background ==
Cody Legebokoff is a Canadian citizen who was born on 21 January 1990 and raised in Fort St. James, a district municipality in rural British Columbia. He has been described by friends and family members as a popular young man who competed in ice hockey and showed no propensity for violence. Though Legebokoff had a minor criminal record, he was not "on the radar" of local police.

After graduating Fort St. James Secondary School, Legebokoff lived briefly in Lethbridge, Alberta, before moving to Prince George, British Columbia. There, he shared an apartment with three close female friends and worked at a Ford dealership. In his spare time, Legebokoff frequented the Canadian social-networking site Nexopia, using the handle "1CountryBoy."

== 2010 arrest ==
On November 27, 2010, at approximately 9:45 p.m., rookie Royal Canadian Mounted Police (RCMP) officer, Constable Aaron Kehler, observed Legebokoff pull his truck onto British Columbia Highway 27 from a remote logging road. According to a case report written by Kehler, Legebokoff's 2004 GMC pickup truck was speeding erratically and, on a hunch, the officer decided to pull over the vehicle for a routine traffic stop. He believed that it was odd and even suspicious that someone would be on that road, that late, in frigid November. Kehler suspected the driver of poaching in the backwoods and signaled for him to pull over.

Kehler was joined by a second RCMP officer. Both officers said that upon searching Legebokoff's pickup truck, they discovered a multi-tool and wrench covered in blood, as well as a monkey backpack and a wallet containing a children's hospital card bearing the name Loren Leslie. When questioned about the blood on him, Legebokoff purportedly said that he was poaching and had clubbed a deer to death because: "I'm a redneck, that's what we do for fun." The truck did not contain a deer carcass.

The officers arrested Legebokoff under the Canada Wildlife Act and called for a conservation officer with animal tracking skills. The warden traced the tire tracks of Legebokoff's vehicle up the road and in the freshly fallen snow, found footprints leading to the remains of Loren Dawn Leslie. After Legebokoff's arrest in connection with Leslie's death, he was linked by DNA analysis to the deaths of Jill Stacey Stuchenko, Cynthia Frances Maas, and Natasha Lynn Montgomery.

== Victims ==
- Jill Stacey Stuchenko, 35-year-old mother of six, last seen on October 9, 2009. She was found dead four days later in a gravel pit on the outskirts of Prince George.
- Natasha Lynn Montgomery, 23-year-old mother of two, last seen August 31 or early September 1, 2010. Her body has never been found, but her DNA was later found in samples taken in Legebokoff's apartment.
- Cynthia Frances Maas, 35, last seen September 10, 2010. Her body was found in a Prince George park the following month. Maas died of blunt-force trauma to the head and penetrating wounds. She had a hole in her shoulder blade, a broken jaw and cheekbone, and injuries to her neck consistent with someone's stomping on it.

The Crown has said Stuchenko, Montgomery and Maas had worked in the sex trade. Legebokoff was addicted to cocaine and used sex workers to get him the drug.

- Loren Donn Leslie, 15, murdered on November 27, 2010. Leslie was far younger than the other victims and allegedly met Legebokoff online at the website Nexopia. She was legally blind, having one completely blind eye and 50% vision in the other. Leslie is included in the list of murder victims found along the "Highway of Tears" in northern British Columbia.

== Trial proceedings ==
R. v. Legebokoff
- Court: Supreme Court of British Columbia
- Full case name: Regina v. Cody Alan Legebokoff
- Decided: 16 September 2014
- Citations: R. v. Legebokoff, 2014 BCSC 1746

Court membership
- Judge sitting: W. G. Parrett

Legebokoff's trial on four counts of first-degree murder was originally scheduled to begin in September 2013, but was delayed a month until October, and then again until June 2014. He pleaded not guilty to all four counts. The judge and twelve jurors heard testimony from 93 Crown witnesses and the defendant.

Legebokoff testified during the trial that he was "involved" in three of the deaths but claimed that he did not commit the killings. He alleged that a drug dealer and two accomplices, whom he would only name as "X, Y and Z", were the actual murderers. Prosecutors did not accept this attempt to plead guilty to the lesser charge of second-degree murder.

== Aftermath ==
Legebokoff was convicted on four counts of first-degree murder on September 11, 2014. On September 16, Legebokoff was sentenced to life in prison with no possibility of parole for 25 years. Additionally, British Columbia Supreme Court Justice Glen Parrett added him to the national sex offender registry, given the sexual assaults committed as part of the murders and Legebokoff's apparent degradation of the victims' bodies. "He lacks any shred of empathy or remorse," Parrett said of the killer. "He should never be allowed to walk among us again."

In February 2015, Legebokoff filed an appeal due to decisions against change of venue and defendant's legal representation. In September 2016, all three judges in the BC Court of Appeal case endorsed the original judge's decision.

Legebokoff was originally imprisoned at the Kent Institution but was transferred in March 2019 to the Warkworth Institution.

== In popular culture ==
The Legebokoff case is covered in the 2015 documentary Highway of Tears. Florida writer J.T. Hunter profiled Legebokoff in the book The Country Boy Killer: The True Story of Cody Legebokoff, Canada's Teenage Serial Killer, published in 2015. The case was the subject of the episode “Virtual Hitchhiking” in season 7 (ep. 3) of the Investigation Discovery series Web of Lies, which first aired March 8th, 2021.

Cody Legebokoff is one of the convicted murderers discussed in season 26, episode 7 ("Highway of tears") of the CBS News show 48 Hours, first aired November 17, 2012.

== See also ==
- List of serial killers by country
