= Cluculz Lake =

Settlement in British Columbia, Canada

Coordinates: 53.893°N 123.594°W

Location of Cluculz Lake in British Columbia

Cluculz Lake is a settlement in British Columbia, located 40 km west of Prince George alongside the Yellowhead Highway. The word "Cluculz" is translated Big Whitefish and is based on a story told by local Carrier people of a group who paddled across the lake in their canoe and were tipped over by a giant Whitefish.

Cluculz Lake is part of Electoral Area F (Vanderhoof Rural). According to the 2011 census, Electoral Area F had a total population of 3,702 people.

In 2013 a controversy arose between a group of residents and land owners at Cluculz Lake and the Regional District of Bulkley-Nechako over the outcome of a referendum which would see them pay for a planned pool in the community of Vanderhoof, British Columbia - which many claimed they would not use. A lawsuit was filed, but later dropped.

== Geography ==
The surface area of the lake is 6223 acres, with a volume of 578,739 acre-feet. Its mean depth is 97 ft, with a maximum depth of 200 ft. It sits at an elevation of 2,500 ft.

The surrounding terrain is dominated by gently rolling hills, pine and spruce forests and fertile agricultural lands. Although mostly flat, the area also has some interesting topography including steep rocky bluffs, waterfalls, and mountains.

== Ecology ==
The lake is home to a variety of fish species, including Rainbow Trout, Sockeye Salmon (Kokanee), Lake Trout (Char), Ptychocheilus (Pikeminnows), Freshwater Whitefish (Whitefish), and Burbot.

== History and archaeology ==
In 1986 Michael William Cranny published a thesis titled "Carrier Settlement and Subsistence in The Chinlac/Cluculz Lake area of Central British Columbia. In it he chronicles some history of the area and findings of archeological surveys he conducted and those done earlier by Charles Borden in 1950 and 1952.
