= Nechako Region =

Region in British Columbia, Canada

The Nechako Region is the second-largest economic development region in British Columbia and covers an area of 200,023 km^{2}, from the Nechako plateau, in central British Columbia, northward to the border with Yukon Territory.

"Nechako" is an anglicization of netʃa koh, a Carrier word that means "big river." The region contains thousands of long lakes, deriving its name. Although it contains the second-largest land area, it has the smallest population of the regions in British Columbia that accounts for only about 1% of British Columbia's entire population.

The region consists of several towns and cities such as Atlin, Burns Lake, Dease Lake, Fort St. James, Houston, Smithers, Telkwa, and Vanderhoof. Its economy is mainly based on forestry, mining, agriculture, and tourism.

== Geography ==
The Nechako region is a large geographic and economic development region in the British Columbia Interior, generally associated with the basin of the Nechako River and the Nechako Plateau. It is centered near Prince George and characterized by extensive forests, wetlands, and numerous lakes within a sub-boreal landscape. To the south of Nechako is the Chilcotin Plateau, and to the north is the Nation River.

The region lies within the traditional territories of several First Nations, including the Sekani and Kaska Dene in the northern portions and the Dakelh (Carrier) and Wetʼsuwetʼen in the central and southern areas. The landscape is generally mountainous and dissected by major river systems and lakes, which have supported Indigenous travel networks, trade, and subsistence economies for millennia.

== Climate ==
Nechako experiences a four-season climate. The Nechako region has cool winters and long warm summers. The temperatures during the seasons may vary from as low as -13 °C to the warm temperatures of 19 °C or even 23 °C in the Southern more populated areas. In addition, because the Nechako region is also the largest region and expands throughout into the interior of British Columbia, the temperatures can somewhat change depending on your location. The weather in this area is fairly steady and has light precipitation. During the winter, there may be moderate levels of snow while summers are warm and moist. The precipitation and weather remains steady and usually provides enough rainfall to irrigate crops. However, there have been several cases in the past where the precipitation was insufficient for the crops. Regardless, the climate in Nechako remains constant without much variation.

== Tourism ==
The Nechako region, and especially Vanderhoof, has a growing tourism industry. Vanderhoof is found at the geographical centre of the province about the same latitude as Edmonton, and on the same longitude as Nanaimo. It is located 100 km (62 mi) west of Prince George and 35 km (22 mi) east of Fort Fraser on the Yellow head Hwy 16. It sits on a plateau above the Nechako River Valley. No other B.C. community, except in the Peace River Country, is so distant from mountains, enabling the people of Vanderhoof to enjoy a wide expanse of sky. Such natural features are of significant influence on Vanderhoof's economic development, particularly in tourism. Vanderhoof is surrounded by fertile farmlands and miles of forests. It also quickly became a centre for logging and ranching. Vanderhoof is the gateway to outdoor pursuits that include hiking, mountain biking, and camping. Also, those interested in the area's history have a chance to explore the Vanderhoof Heritage Museum, which features 11 historical buildings and gives visitors a taste of what life was like in the area in the 1920s. An hour's drive away is Cheslatta Falls at the mouth of the Cheslatta River, and the Kenney Dam.

== Rural versus urban development ==
The Nechako region is the lowest-populated region in British Columbia. Nechako is filled with outdoor wilderness-like areas and has a growing industry in tourism. The region is mostly used for its resources. Forestry is one of the most common. Nechako has far more trees than other parts of British Columbia. Other resources high in popularity are mining which occurs in the North, and agriculture occurring in the Southern parts of Nechako. Because of all this rural development, urban development has not flourished within this region. Slight signs of urban development can only be found in the few cities and towns located along the same highway. Notable cities include Vanderhoof, Smithers, and Houston. These cities all revolve around resources. In conclusion, rural development has been more dominant than urbanization in Nechako.

== Market supply and demand ==
The law of market supply and demand has caused many severe problems. Temporary layoffs, loss of jobs, and even shut downs all had to be executed because of supply and demand. The key industries, being mining and forestry are the most affected by market supply and demand. With such a large forestry base, this region specializes in the lumber industry. The lumber industry is what has been affected the most by the laws of supply and demand. This includes the plywood, paper and pulp, and many more lumber products. Because of excessive supply, the paper and pulp industry took a massive fall in profits. The price of its products fell drastically and caused its business to be stolen by other competitors. The price on softwood lumber was also decreased. Supply and demand caused it to drop by 12.4% in 2005. In 2008, a majority of forestry operations had to be halted because of a significant drop in demand of forest products. The mining industries on the other hand, have been minimally affected.

== NAFTA ==
The North America Free Trade Agreement (NAFTA) is a free trade agreement that became effective as of January 1, 1994. It has had a major impact on the region. With the tariffs between Mexico, the United States, and Canada eradicated, countless dollars have been saved from imports and exports. As one of the largest forestry industries in British Columbia, Nechako has been known to transport large amounts of forestry goods. In fact, in 2002, Nechako produced over 15% of British Columbia's entire lumber production.

NAFTA allows British Columbia to transport its lumber products at lower prices. In addition to transporting lumber, Nechako also has its part in fishing and mining, both of which are affected by NAFTA. However, competition between manufacturers has been stirred up by NAFTA.

== Population ==
The Nechako region is the largest among the other regions in British Columbia, but it has the smallest population. In 1986, the total population was 39,495. During the years counting up to 1991 the population has increased by 1,001 to 40,496. As the years go by, the population continues to increase. By 1996, it has increased to 43,033. At the beginning of the new millennium, 2001, the population unfortunately decreased to 42,172. In 2006, the population continued to decline to 39,352, which is less than the original population in 1986. The makeup of the population is as follows: Ages from 45 to 64 are about 45% of the entire population. Children, teenagers and young adults from 0 to 24 years old are approximately 10% of the population. People from 25 to 44, 65 to 74, and 75+ average about 18% each.

== Resource base/agricultural base ==
Cities and towns that are in the Nechako region such as, Atlin, Burns Lake, Dease Lake, Fort St.James, Houston, Smithers, Telkwa, and Vanderhoof are all resource based. Atlin is the located most Northern and most Western town in British Columbia. The surroundings of Atlin is vast wilderness, containing lakes, mountains, glaciers, plateaus and valleys. Mining and tourism supports the economy of Atlin. Burns Lake offers fishing during the summer and winter. Some people may come to Burns Lake to hunt for agate and opal rocks at the Eagle Creek Deposits. The main industry that is located here is logging. The Fraser Lake is the Swan Capital of the world. An establishment of a fur-trading post was created by an explorer Simon Fraser in 1914. In the beginning of the 1900s, the Fraser Lake Sawmill was owned by West Fraser Timber Company Ltd. It has now gradually evolved into one of the world's most modern sawmills. In this area, there were the Endako Molybdenum Mines; at one point it became the world's second largest Molybdenum Mine. Vanderhoof is surrounded by fertile farm land and miles of forests. The natural resource based economy mostly relied on forestry, agriculture and tourism. Manufacturing industries are attracted to the available land and natural gas supplies.

== Branch plants ==
The Nechako Region has many industries and companies, which are located all over the region. The Nechako Construction Ltd. Has a branch plant located in Alberta and Nechako. The Nechako Construction Ltd. has several ongoing projects. For example, under the Lumber Manufacturing category, they are currently constructing a turnkey sawmill and planer complex for Slocan, Quesnel, British Columbia and Yakima Forest Products. The Nechako Construction Ltd. also works on Thermal oil, Canfor, Houston and Tolko Slave Lake are both getting a reciprocating grate thermal oil system.

Another large company is called the Nechako Mechanical Vanderhoof Ltd. They have industrial projects in British Columbia, Alberta, Saskatchewan, and the Yukon. Nechako Mechanical Ltd. has their equipment used by other regions such as Russia, Washington, Oregon, Idaho and California. This company has 6 facilities: Fabrication Plant, Paint Shop, Machine Shop, Millwrighting Shop, their main Office, and 5 fenced acres (20,000 m^{2}) of land.

== Geographical landscape ==
Upper Nechako lies within the expansive Nechako Plateau, part of the larger North Central Interior Plateau. The topography of the Nechako Plateau is dominated by gently rolling hills. There were ancient volcanic actions and the cone-shaped Cutoff Butte north of Knewstubb Lake is a significant landmark indicating an aboriginal trail. Three major rivers are the Nechako, in the centre, the Blackwater, to the south, and the Entiako, to the west. All three have carved wide fertile valleys into the Nechako Plateau. There are close to 1000 lakes, big and small, and the waters of several streams and creeks fall down in beautiful waterfalls. In addition to the lakes and rivers, numerous mountains and valleys are also part of the geographical landscape of Nechako.

== Demographics ==
In 1996 the Nechako agricultural sector covered 295,554 acres (1,196.06 km^{2}), rented or under lease. Prince George serves as a main service and supply center to the Nechako region. It also provides many regional government health care services and post secondary education. Prince Rupert is also an important city in the Nechako. It is located to the West of Nechako Region and has a population of more than 24,000. It is a major shipping center for timber, coal, and grain. The major cities of the Nechako region are Prince Rupert, Terrace, and Kitimat. It is estimated that 50,260 people of the population are employed.

== Globalization ==
Farming was always a major activity in Nechako. As the number of farms was increasing, the acreage of the farms became smaller. The farms were used for pure-bred production, green house, produce commercial beef, and gray/hay production. A total of 18,925 acres (76.59 km^{2}) were filled with field crops such as hay, wheat, and barley.

Farm classification	# of farms
Dairy	20
Beef	227
Hog	0
Poultry	6
Grain	6
Field crop	64
Miscellaneous	54
Live stock	12
Vegetable	2
Other	11

== Industrial activity ==
As with many other parts of British Columbia, the Nechako region consists of numerous kinds of industrial activity. Primary, secondary and tertiary activities all show glimpses of existence within Nechako even though they may not have an equal part in the economy. The primary activities consists of the mining and forestry, while the secondary activity is the production of various products utilising the resources gathered by the two resources. Tertiary activities include the sales and repair sectors in the region which are not as large as the primary and secondary industrial activities.

== Natural resources ==
The two dominant resources in the Nechako region are mining and forestry. Nechako is flooded with trees throughout making it one of British Columbia's largest industries. Mining on the other hand, is very popular as well. Extending throughout towards the Yukon Border, this area contains many valuable mines.

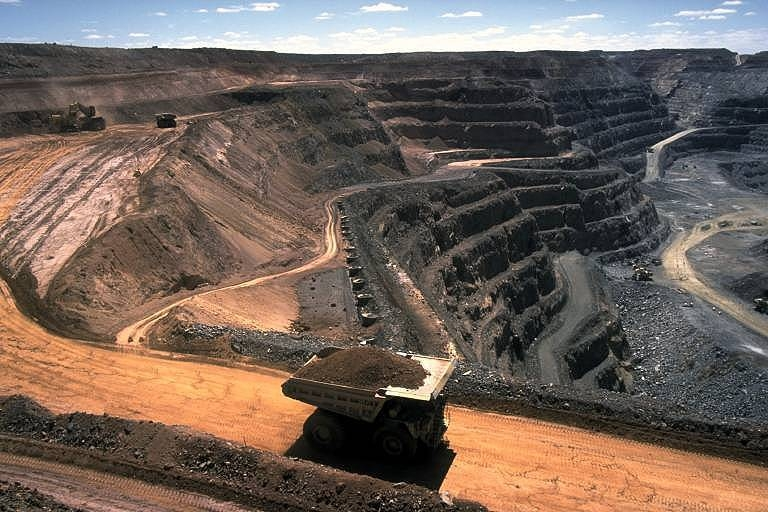
Coal Mine

=== Mining ===
Mining is a big part of B.C's resources, because of the gold rushes. This drew people from other parts of the world which stayed after the rush, helping the development of B.C. 9700 workers were hired in 1995, and were the highest paid group of workers. British Columbia's most valuable mining products are Coal, Copper, Petroleum, and natural gas.

=== Forestry ===
The Forestry industry is also important, cutting trees and using the timber. Paper, plywood and lumber are made by timber that is pulped. Today, forestry in B.C provides 292 500 jobs and 62% of B.C's exports are forest products. The communities located in the Nechako region are along the east-west Yellowhead highway. Also known as Highway 16, this Highway connects the four western provinces of Canada. It stretches East to West from Prince George to Prince Rupert.
