= Kʼëgit pole =

Totem pole in Paris, France

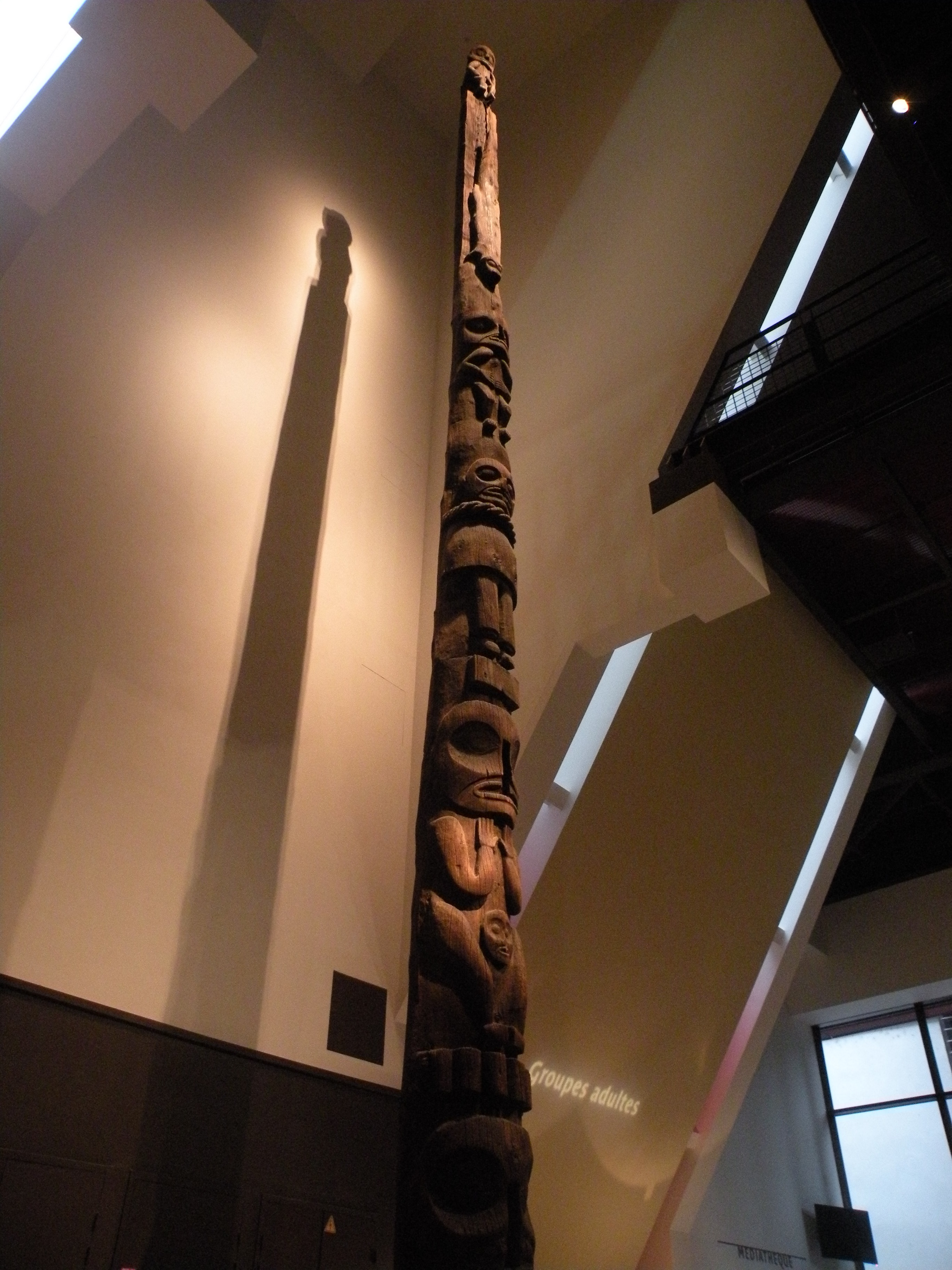
- in 2015
- Year: c. 1860
- Medium: totem pole
- Location: Musée du Quai Branly – Jacques Chirac, Paris, France

The Kʼëgit pole, also called the Kaiget pole or the Mat Totem, is a Wetʼsuwetʼen totem pole in the collection of the Musée du Quai Branly in Paris, France. It was made around the 1860s, for a Likhsilyu clan chief, C’idimsggin’ïs. It was a landmark in the Wetʼsuwetʼen village of Hagwilget. In 1938, it caught the attention of Swiss surrealist painter Kurt Seligmann. Seligmann had been sent to Canada by the Musée de l'Homme to acquire objects for their Americas collection. He spent several months negotiating the sale of the pole. With the support of a local Indian agent and ethnographer Marius Barbeau, he acquired the pole for $100 after symbolically marrying a dead woman from the clan. The symbolic marriage facilitated his adoption into the clan, which allowed him to take possession of the Kʼëgit pole.

The pole was taken to France and put on display at the Musée de l'Homme in January 1939. Seligmann loaned the pole to the museum, and after his death, his wife left the pole to the museum on her death in 1992. It was transferred to the collection of the Musée du Quai Branly after its construction.

The Likhsilyu clan have stated that the totem pole is theirs due to Wet’suwet’en law, and that the original sale was made under pressure from the Canadian government.

== Description and location ==
The pole is made from cedar; and it is 14.51 metres tall.

A Wetʼsuwetʼen totem pole, the Kʼëgit pole depicts the supernatural healer (or shaman) Kʼëgit. He is an important figure in the Likhsilyu (Note: Also spelt Laksilyu) clan's House of Many Eyes' history and features on the Likhsilyu clan crest. Alongside Kʼëgit, the pole shows an otter and various other creatures or crests, including a human representing C’idimsggin’ïs with a cedar bark neck ring.

The pole had badly deteriorated by the late 1930s and the base rotted. Damage had also been caused by a recent flood. Fixed and repainted before its removal to Europe, the pole was eventually treated with preservatives and filled with epoxy. In the collection of the Musée du Quai Branly in Paris, France, the pole stands opposite the museum's collection of musical instruments in the 2000s.

== History ==
=== Creation ===
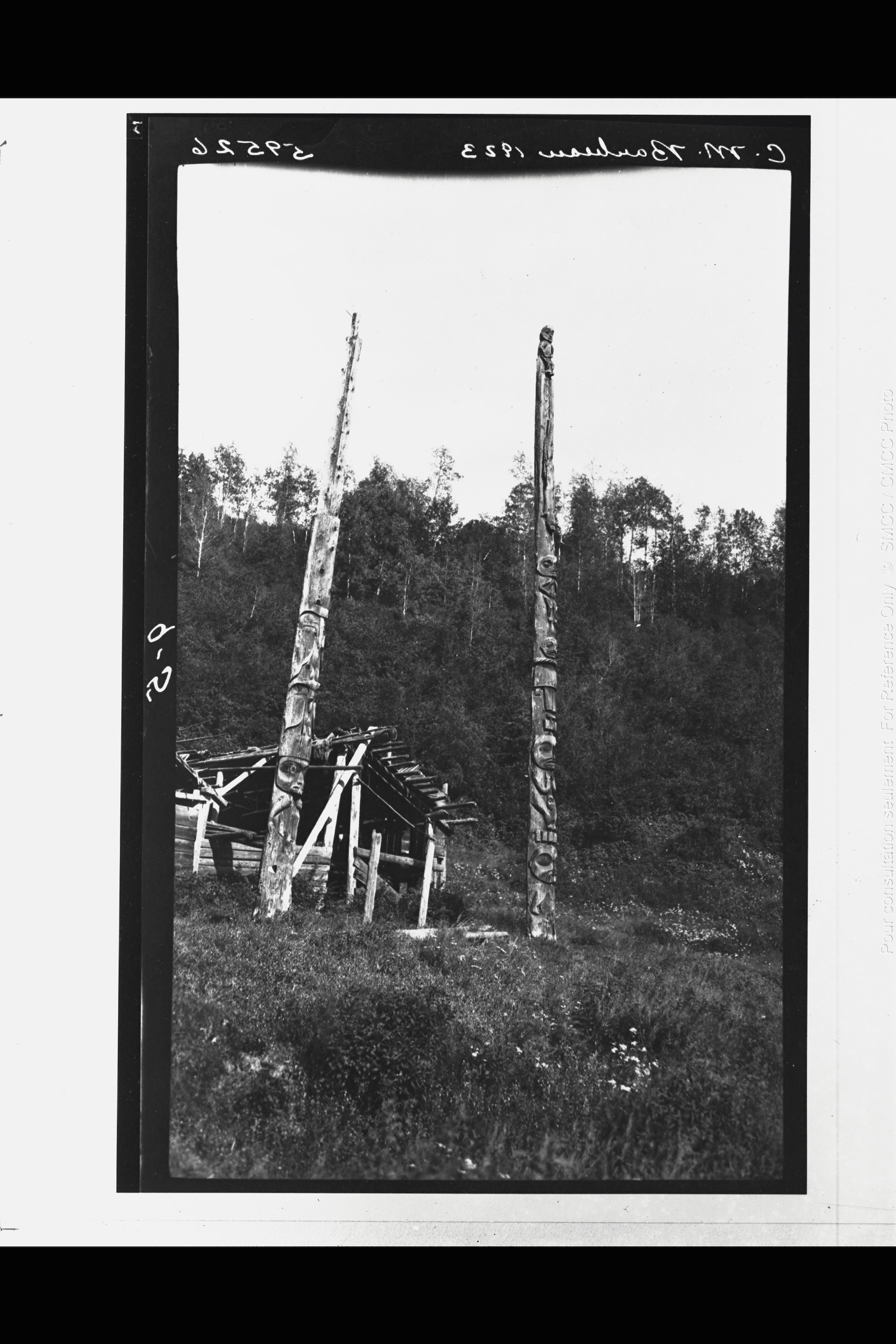
Photograph taken by Marius Barbeau of the Kʼëgit pole in Hagwilget

The Kʼëgit pole was carved around the 1860s for C’idimsggin’ïs, (Note: Also spelt Gitdumskanees) the chief of the House of Many Eyes and the highest ranking chief of Likhsilyu Clan. Installed in front of his home in Hagwilget, it was carved Samali from Hagwilget) and Tsibasa from Gitsegukla. Overlooking the Bulkley Canyon, it was a landmark in its community.

=== Sale to Kurt Seligmann ===
During the surrealist movement, Northwest Coast art and totem poles piqued the interest of the European surrealist movement; the Kʼëgit pole was no exception. the Swiss painter Kurt Seligmann was interested in Native North American art . In June 1938, he and his wife, Arlette, went to British Columbia to collect American artefacts for the French Musée de l'Homme. They stayed at a trading post in Hazelton, a Gitxsan community in Upper Skeena region near the border of Wetʼsuwetʼen village of Hagwilget. They lived there for four months, recording stories and drawing totem poles.

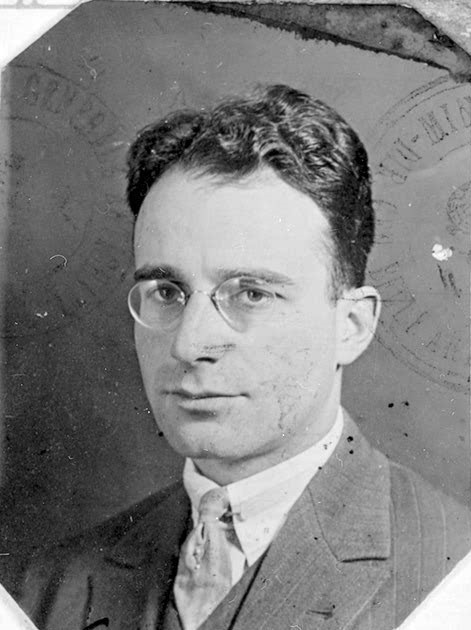
Kurt Seligmann, who purchased the pole in 1938 for $100.

Seligmann chose the older and better preserved Kʼëgit pole although there were just a few poles left standing in Hagwilget. The pole had a "beautiful silver grey to copper patina" that caught Seligmann's eye. With the support of Canadian ethnographer Marius Barbeau and the Indian agent at Hazelton, G C Mortimer, he talked to 70 clan members to negotiate a sale.

People in the Gitxsans communities were reluctant to let go of their poles. Potlatches and native dancing had been banned by the government, although they sought to preserve totem poles. Gitxsan people resisted these preservation attempts, favouring the re-installation of these older poles. Nonetheless, a meeting between the descendants of C’idimsggin’ïs and Seligmann went ahead, and a purchase was arranged in September of that year. He paid $100 dollars, split between six people for the pole. However in order to take possession, he also had to symbolically marry a dead woman so that he could be adopted into the clan. French law required that the federal government give permission before the totem pole left Canadian territory; the Indian agent, Mortimer, arranged for the Department of Indian Affairs to grant an export certificate in just five days. Seligmann expressed his gratitude at the quick turnaround, saying:

I can't thank the Canadian Government or the provincial body enough for allowing me to purchase the totem. Ordinarily permits are practically impossible to get, but when I applied to the Indian agent at Hazelton, B.C., he quickly referred me in turn to the commissioner of Indian affairs in Vancouver and later to the department at Ottawa. Within four days I was advised I could ship the tribal monument to Paris

A local paper welcomed the sale of the pole; it said the pole was "useless where it was and now", while in France it "would be a continuous advertisement of British Columbia". The Kʼëgit pole was repainted by First Nations carvers and rot repaired; some figures were recarved based on other poles. The totem pole was cut in half and taken by train to Vancouver, then France. It was then cut again, this time to fit it into the museum.

Seligmann owned the Kʼëgit pole and it was put on display in the portico of the newly built Musée de l'Homme on January 20, 1939. Surrealist Benjamin Péret labeled it "Krikiett, the Tallest Totem Pole in Europe".

Seligmann wrote about his time in British Columbia and his acquisition of the totem pole in the Journal de la Société des américanistes and the surrealist magazine Minotaure. His article in Minotaure, published as "Entretien avec un Tsimshian", was illustrated with photographs Segilmann had taken in Alert Bay and other places. It was presented as a conversation between Seligmann and Chief Donald Grey as they discuss European legends, Wetʼsuwetʼen totem poles and the role of women in myths of both cultures. Grey discussed Christianity from his perspective and mourns what he perceives to be a lack of interest in younger generations in these legends and the way they “show no respect for the elders, who jealously keep to themselves their ancient secrets”. Seligmann's writings credited the people who told him stories and, like other surrealist writings, condemned colonialism and its impacts on people.

Kurt Seligmann died in 1962. When his wife, Arlette Paraf, died in 1992, she donated the pole to the museum.

=== 21st century ===
The totem pole is housed in the Musée du Quai Branly.

After the construction of the Musée du Quai Branly, the totem pole was transferred to its collection and put on display in the entrance.

In October, 2024, a delegation from the Likhsilyu clan of the Wetʼsuwetʼen nation visited the totem pole in Paris. They were allowed to view the pole after the museum had closed, perform a ceremony, and sing songs.

== Ownership ==
The totem pole was sold to Kurt Seligmann in 1938; some descendants of the original sellers and representatives of the Likhsilyu clan stated, in 2024, that this sale was made under pressure from the Canadian government. Birdy Markert, a descendent of one of the original sellers, Arthur Michell (Hagwilnekhlh), stated that her ancestor was "taken advantage of" due to his advanced age and felt that the "transaction was made under duress". Further, under Wet’suwet’en law, the totem pole would have reverted back to them upon Seligmann's death; the Likhsilyu clan view the pole as their property.

As of 2026, the Likhsilyu clan had not requested repatriation of the Kʼëgit pole; the preservation it has undergone prevents returning the totem pole to the ground, so an expensive and specialized facility would need to be constructed for the pole to reside in Wet’suwet’en lands. Instead, the clan has considered building a replica pole in Canada. According to the curator of the Americas exhibit at the Musée du Quai Branly, while they would hear requests to repatriate the totem pole, "even if it were the museum’s wish, we wouldn’t have the right to do it". French law prohibits the sale or gifting of objects in museums.

== See also ==
- List of totem poles

== Sources ==
=== Bibliography ===
- Mauzé, Marie (2008). "Totemic Landscapes and Vanishing Cultures". Journal of Surrealism and the Americas. 1 (2) – via HAL.
- Sawin, Martica (1995). Surrealism in Exile and the Beginning of the New York School. MIT Press. ISBN 0262692015.
- Tythacott, Louise (2003). Surrealism and the Exotic. Routledge. ISBN 0-415-27637-3.
