= Hagwilget =

First Nations in Canada community

Coordinates: 55°15′00″N 127°36′00″W

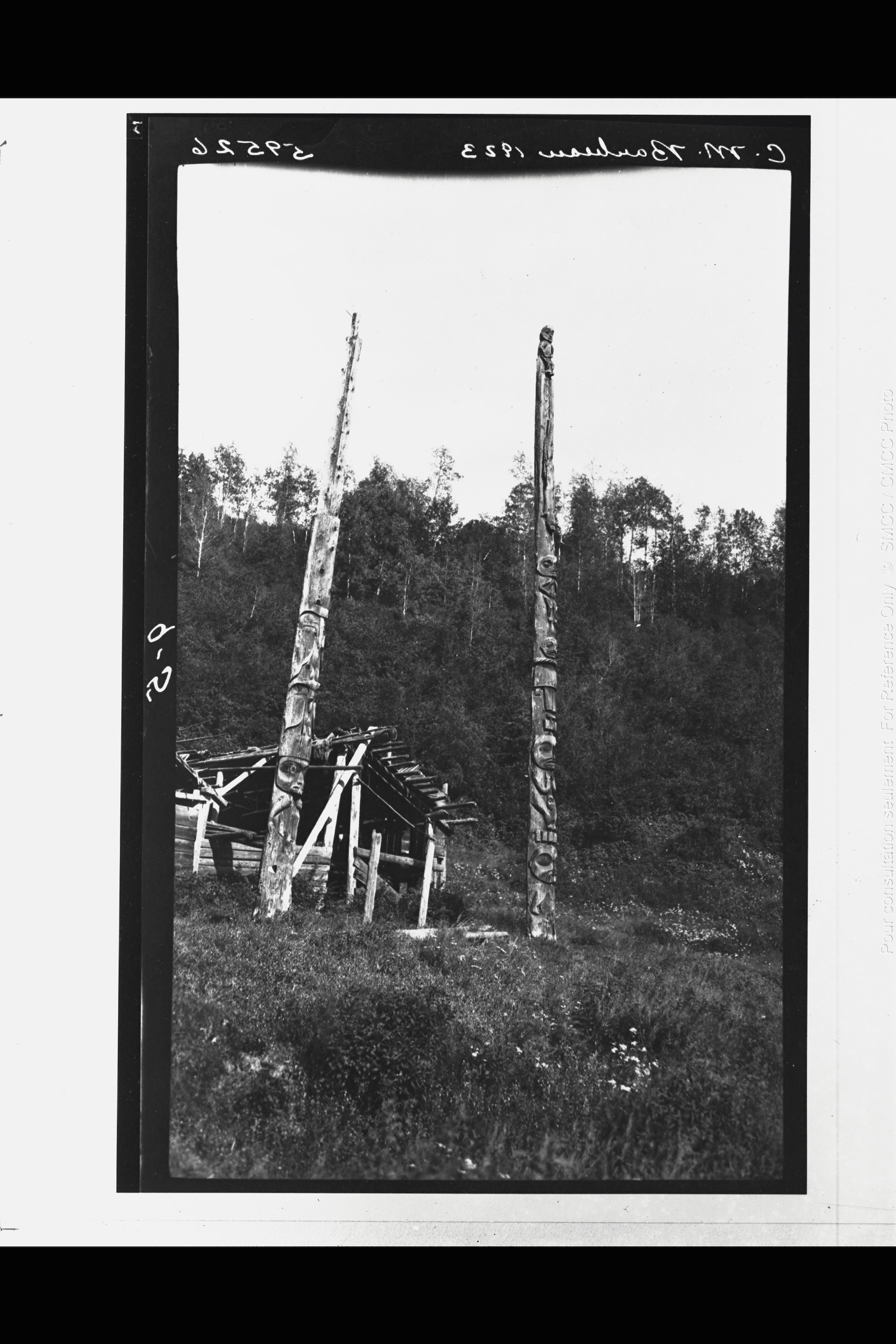
Photograph taken by Marius Barbeau of the Kʼëgit pole when it was still in Hagwilget

Hagwilget or Hagwilgyet is a First Nations reserve community of the Gitxsan people located on the lower Bulkley River just east of Hazelton in northwestern British Columbia, Canada. The community's name means "well-dressed" as in "ostentatious," though another meaning is "the quiet people". It has also been spelled Awillgate and Ackwilgate and it has also been named Rocher Déboulé - "falling rock" - a reference to a landslide in this area from Rocher Déboulé Mountain, which blocked salmon runs on the Bulkley River at this location.

The Kʼëgit pole in the collection of the Musée du Quai Branly in Paris, France, was originally in Hagwilget.

- Hagwilget Canyon
- Hagwilget Canyon Bridge
