= Hagwilget Canyon Bridge =

Bridge in Hagwilget, British Columbia, Canada

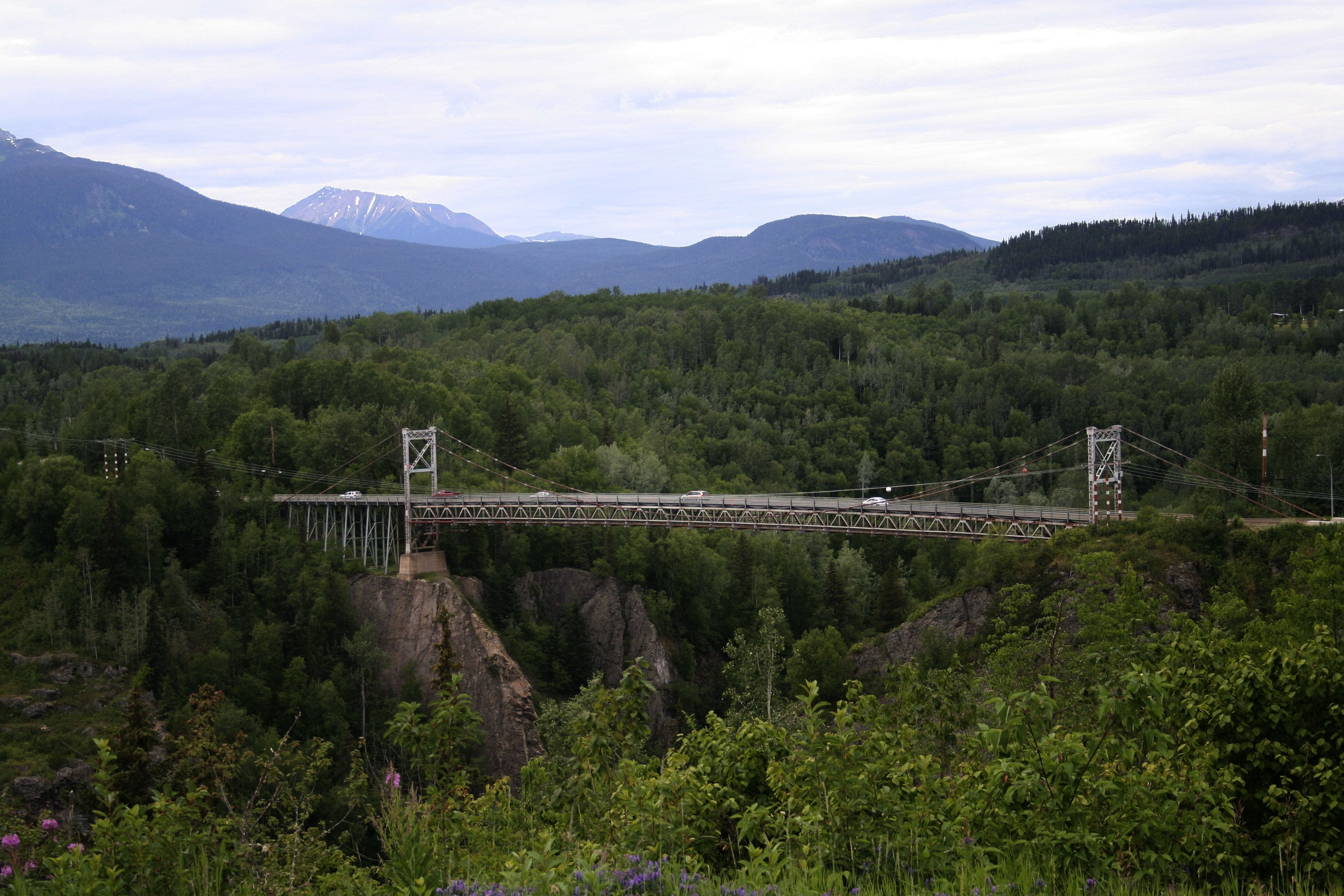
- Coordinates: 55°15′27″N 127°36′14″W
- Carries: Vehicular traffic, pedestrians
- Crosses: Bulkley River (Hagwilget Canyon)
- Locale: Hagwilget, BC

Characteristics
- Design: Suspension Bridge
- Total length: 140.2 metres (460 ft)
- Width: 4.9 metres (16 ft)
- Height: 80 metres (262 ft)

History
- Construction end: 1931 (reinforced in 1990)

Hagwilget Canyon Bridge is a suspension bridge over the Hagwilget Canyon on the Bulkley River, at the Wet'suwet'en village of Hagwilget, British Columbia. The current bridge was constructed in 1931, and later reinforced in 1990.

Three previous bridges spanned the same location, the first constructed by Wet'suwet'en people, generations before white settlement. The Wet'suwet'en later reinforced their wooden-pole bridge using cable abandoned after the disbandment of the Russian–American Telegraph expedition.

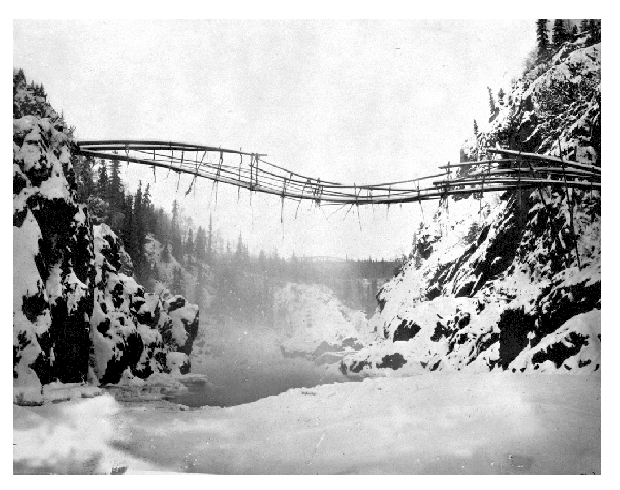
Hagwilget First Bridge

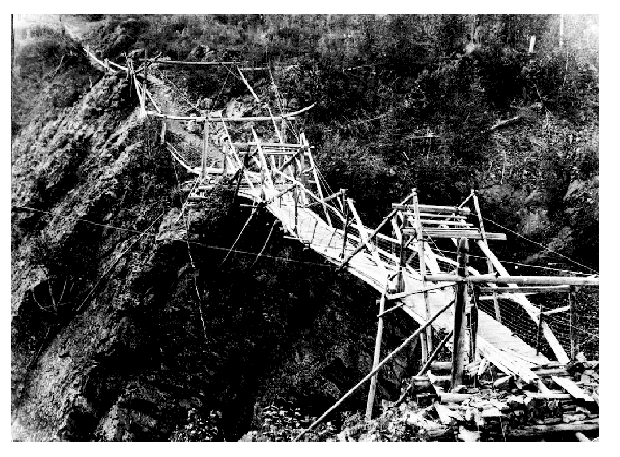
Hagwilget Second Bridge

== See also ==
- List of bridges in Canada
