= Musée du Quai Branly – Jacques Chirac =

Museum for indigenous art in Paris

- Musée du Quai Branly – Jacques Chirac
- Interactive fullscreen map
- Established: 2006
- Location: 37 Quai Branly, 75007 Paris, France
- Coordinates: 48°51′39″N 2°17′51″E
- Type: Museum for the traditional art of Africa, Asia, Oceania, and the Americas in Paris, France
- Visitors: 1,150,000 (2016): Ranked 4th nationally
- Website: www.quaibranly.fr

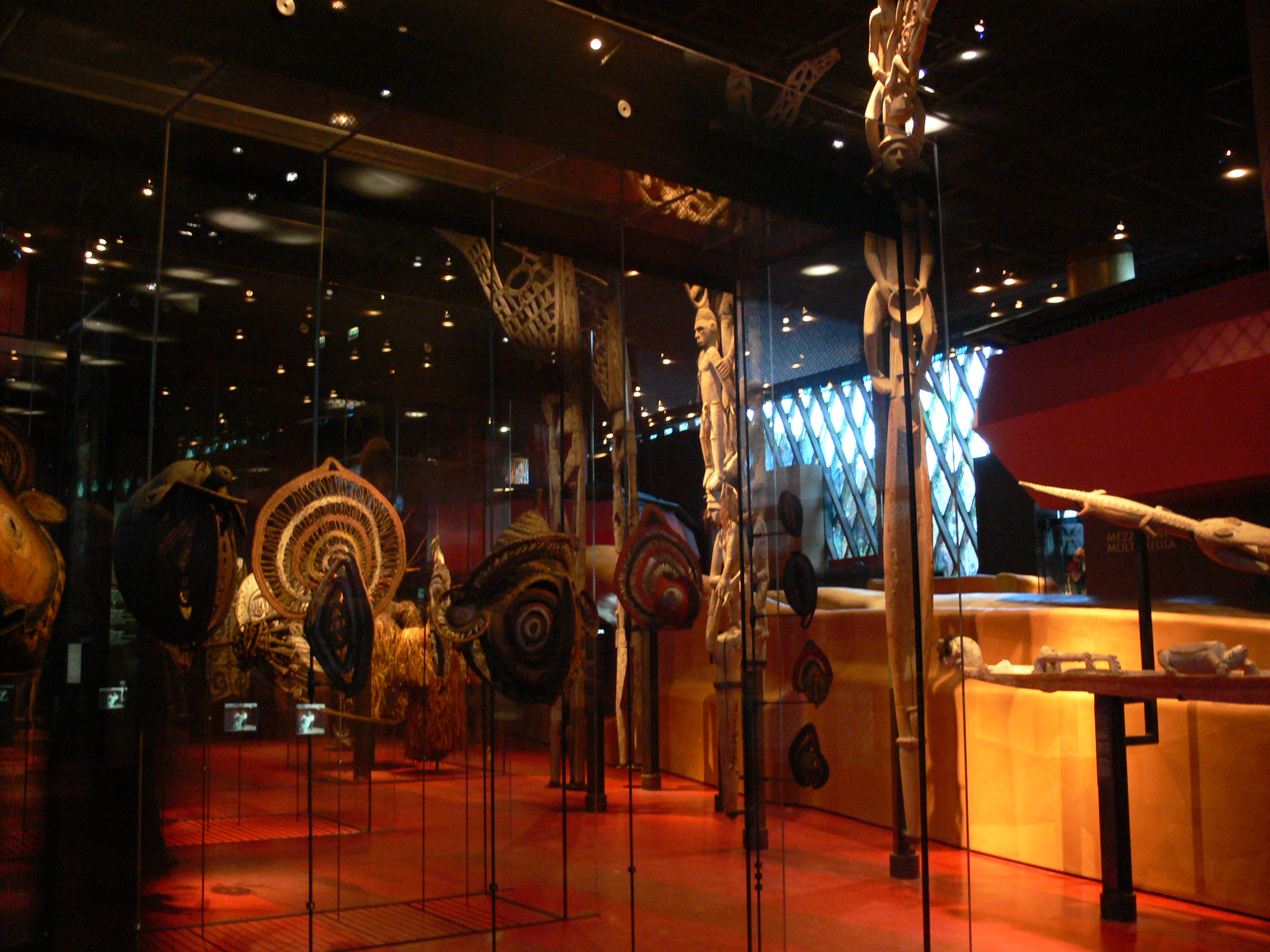
View of the African exhibit hall

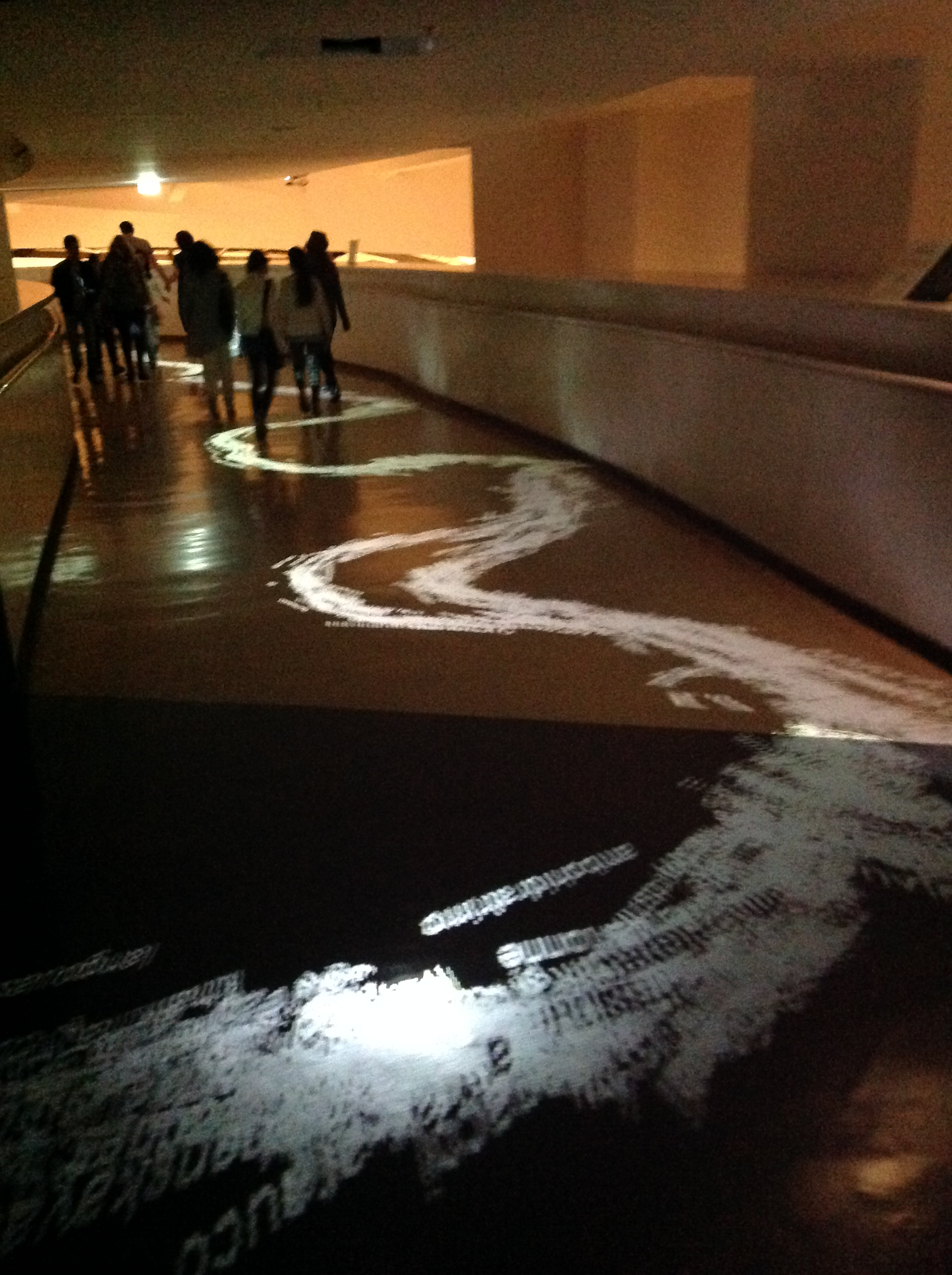
A moving stream of words, called "The River", a site specific art work by Charles Sandison, flows down the winding ramp that leads from the entrance of the museum to the main galleries

The Musée du Quai Branly – Jacques Chirac (French pronunciation: [myze dy ke bʁɑ̃li ʒak ʃiʁak]; English: Jacques Chirac Museum of Quay Branly, MQB) is an art museum located in Paris, France. The museum, designed by French architect Jean Nouvel, features the indigenous art and cultures of Africa, Asia, Oceania, and the Americas. The museum collection comprises more than a million objects (ethnographic objects, photographs, documents, etc.), of which 3,500 are on display at any given time in both permanent and temporary thematic exhibits. A selection of objects from the museum is also displayed in the Gallery of the Five Continents of the Louvre.

The Museum Quai Branly opened in 2006; it is the newest of the major museums in Paris and received 1.15 million visitors in 2016. It is jointly administered by the French Ministry of Culture and the Ministry of Higher Education and Research, and serves as both a museum and as a center for research.

The museum is located in the 7th arrondissement of Paris, on the left bank of the Seine, close to the Eiffel Tower and the Alma Bridge. Since its conception, the museum has been the subject of praise as well as controversy, with some journalists, scholars, and governments calling for the repatriation of parts of its collections that were acquired through colonial conquest.

== History ==
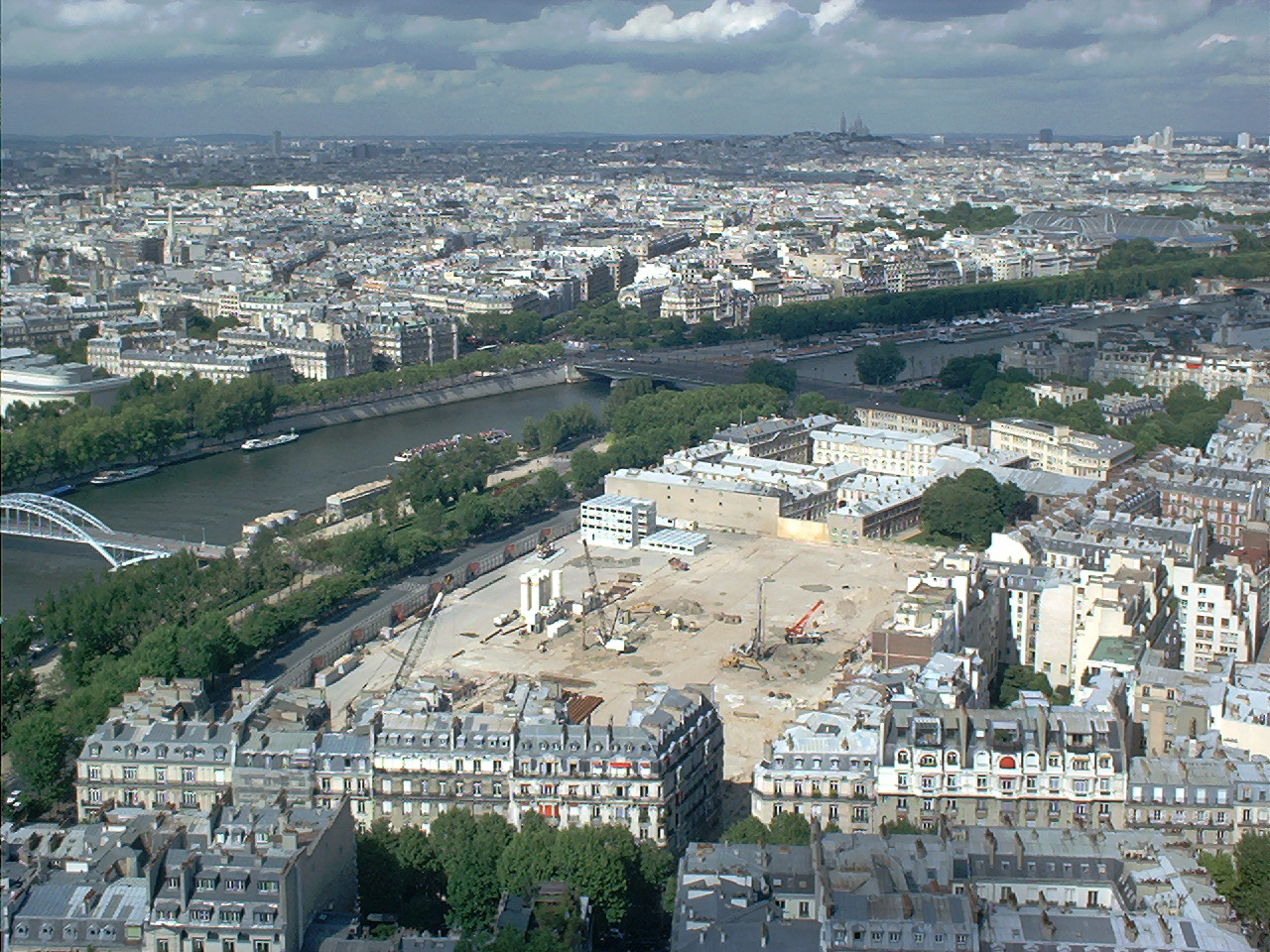
Musée du Quai Branly under construction, May 2000

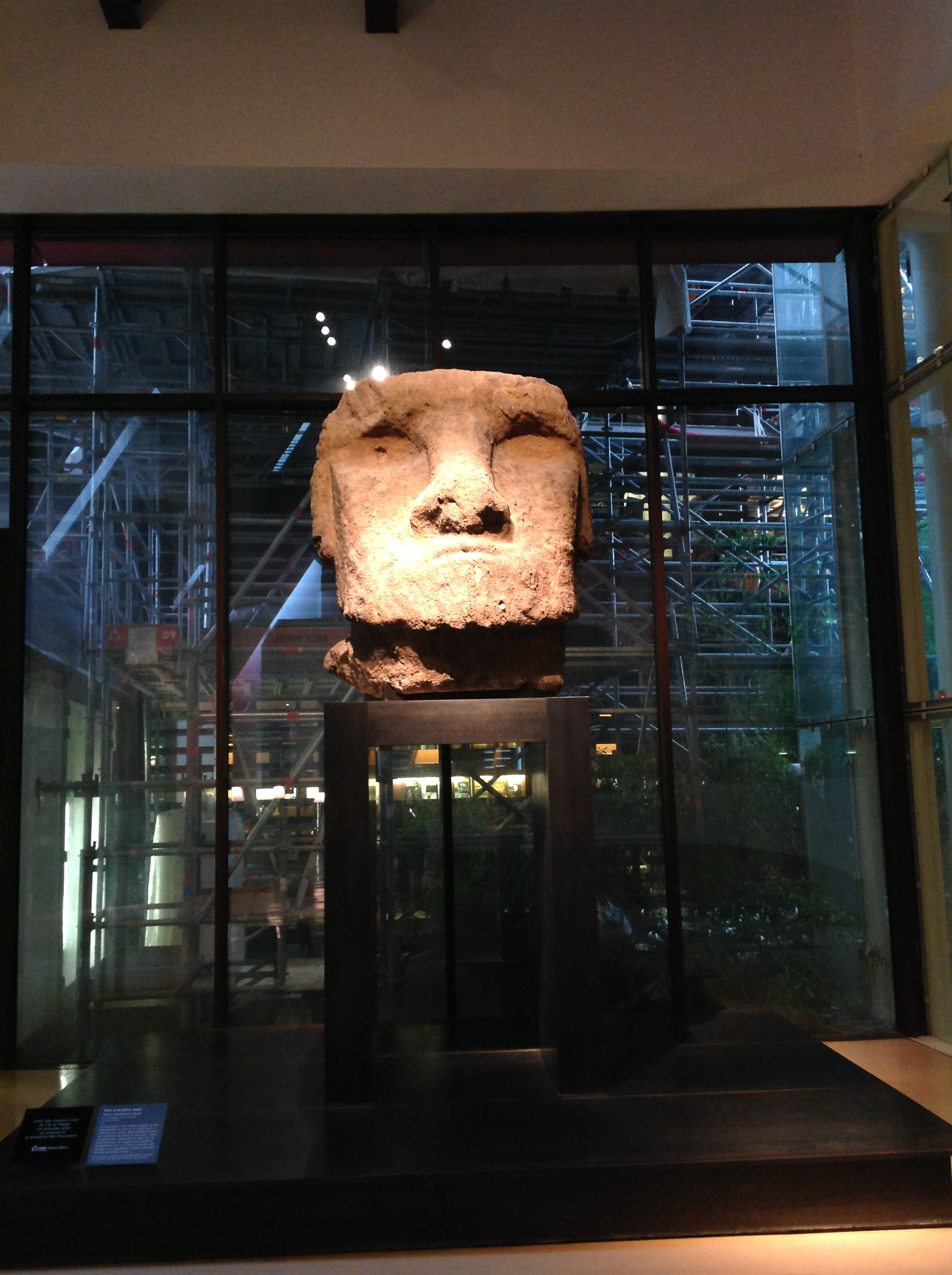
A Moai ancestor's head from Easter Island (11th–15th century), carried to France in 1872 by the French Rear-Admiral Lapelin, now in the entrance hall of the museum

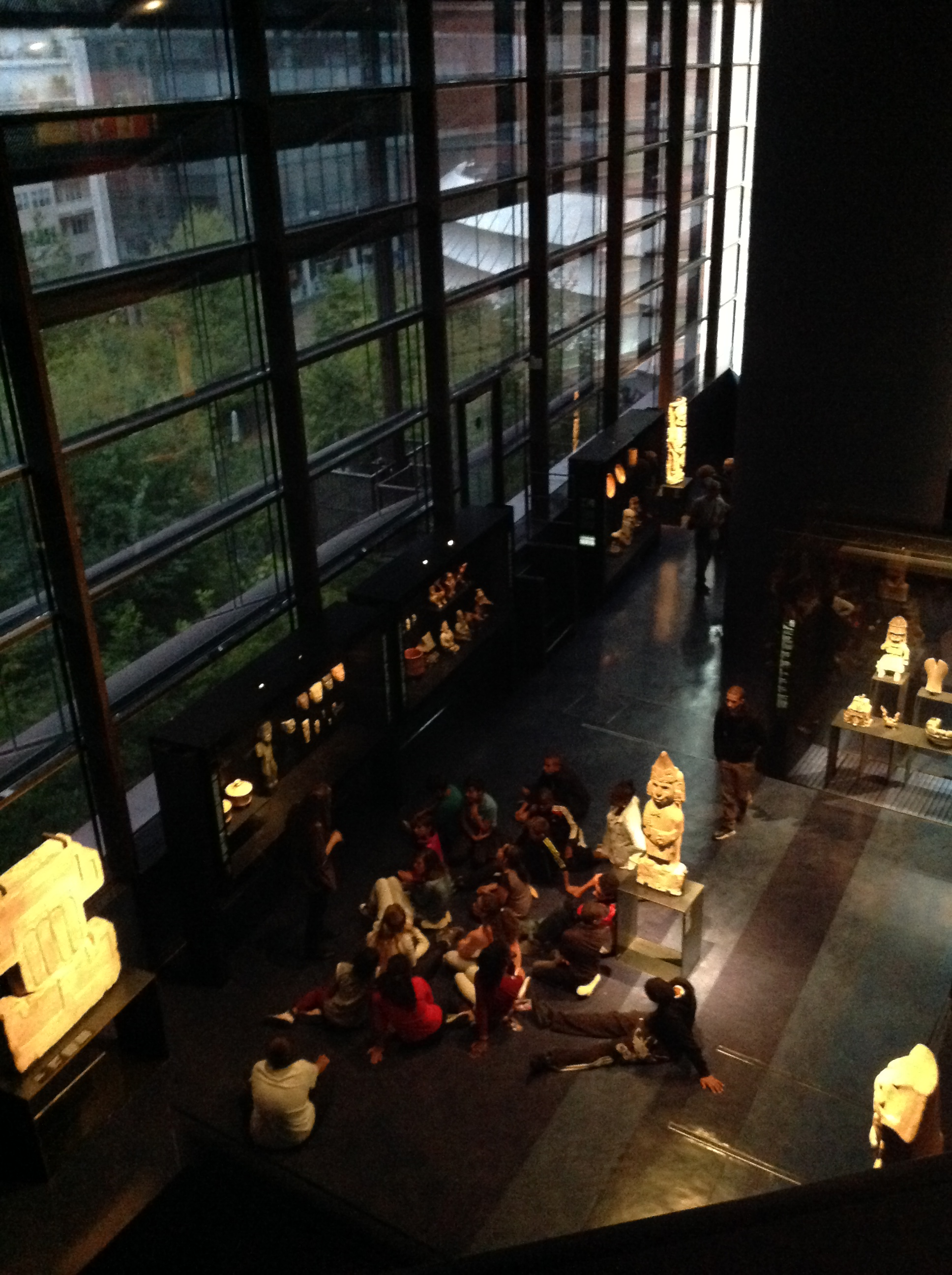
Schoolchildren visiting the Americas gallery, seen from the mezzanine

Following the tradition of French presidents building museums as monuments to their time in office, as exemplified by Presidents Georges Pompidou (Centre Georges Pompidou); Valéry Giscard d'Estaing (Musée d'Orsay) and François Mitterrand (Grand Louvre), the project for a new museum celebrating the arts of the Americas, Africa, Asia and Oceania was brought to completion by President Jacques Chirac.

Since the first half of the 20th century, a number of French intellectuals and scientists, including André Malraux, André Breton, and Claude Lévi-Strauss, had called for a single and important museum in Paris dedicated to the arts and cultures of the indigenous people of the colonized territories. These had been considered by the science of that time as "primitive" peoples without a culture of their own. Non-European cultural objects were considered as mere ethnographic items or at best as "exotic" art, as exemplified by the large collections gathered by French explorers, missionaries, scientists and ethnologists.

A proposal for such a museum had been made by the ethnologist and art collector Jacques Kerchache in a 1990 manifesto in the newspaper Libération, called "The masterpieces of the entire world are born free and equal." The manifesto was signed by three hundred artists, writers, philosophers, anthropologists and art historians. Kerchache brought the idea to the attention of Jacques Chirac, then Mayor of Paris, and became his advisor. Chirac was elected president of France in 1995, and in the following year announced the creation of a new museum combining the collections of two different museums:

- the 25,000 objects of the Musée national des Arts d'Afrique et d'Océanie (The MAAO or National Museum of the Arts of Africa and Oceania), which had originally been created for the Colonial Exposition of 1931, and then repurposed in 1961 by André Malraux, the Minister of Culture under president Charles DeGaulle, into a museum dedicated to the cultures of the overseas possessions of France.
- the collections of the laboratory of ethnology of Musée de l'Homme ("Museum of Man"), which was created for the Paris Exposition of 1937 and contained 250,000 objects.

The two museums and collections were very different in their purposes and approaches; the MAAO was first and foremost an art collection, run by art historians and conservators, while the Museum of Man was run by ethnologists and anthropologists and thus was interested in the social-cultural context and uses of the objects. As a result of this division, the new museum was put under two different ministries; the Ministry of Education, which oversaw the ethnological teaching and research; and the Ministry of Culture and Communication, which oversaw the artworks.

In addition to these existing collections, gathered by French explorers and ethnologists from around the world, the directors of the new museum acquired ten thousand further objects.

The first venture of the new museum was the opening of a new gallery within the Louvre Museum, in the Pavillon des Sessions, dedicated to what were called the arts premiers, the "first arts". This new section met immediate resistance; traditionalists felt that this kind of art did not belong in the Louvre, while many ethnologists felt that it risked splitting the collections into two parts, with the best objects going to the Louvre. The issue was resolved by a decree by President Chirac and the government of Prime Minister Lionel Jospin on 29 July 1998, to construct an entirely new museum at 29–55 Quai Branly on the banks of the Seine not far from the Eiffel Tower in the 7th arrondissement of Paris. In December 1998, the museum was officially established, and Stéphane Martin was named its president.

The site selected for the new museum, covering an area of 25,000 square meters, was occupied by a collection of buildings belonging to the Ministry of Reconstruction and Urbanism. President François Mitterrand had originally intended it for one of his grand projects, an international conference center, but that project had been abandoned because of intense opposition from the residents of the neighborhood. At the beginning of 1999 a jury was formed and an international competition was held to select an architect. The competition was won by French architect Jean Nouvel, whose other major works include the Institute of the Arab World (1970), and the Fondation Cartier (1991–94) in Paris, the renovation of the Lyon Opera (1986–93), the Palais de Justice in Nantes, and the Parc Poble Nou in Barcelona (2001).

In his design, Nouvel took into account the criticisms of the neighbors who had blocked the Mitterrand project. The new museum was designed to correspond to the adjacent buildings as much as possible; the main building appears lower than the buildings around it and is partially screened from view by its gardens. The shape of the main building follows the curve of the Seine, and the three administrative buildings are constructed to harmonize with the Haussmann-period buildings next to them.

In an attempt to create "a venue that would do justice to the infinite diversity of cultures", the museum is designed in a way that that is supposed to feel open and inclusive. Nouvel designed the interior of the museum in such a way as to liberate artifacts from the traditional design of museums by not including walls, barriers and railings in the gallery spaces. There are no physical or spatial barriers separating the four main geographical areas, so that visitors can go on a simulated "journey" by traveling from one continent to the other. Labels are discreet, and plaques with ethnological context are brief, emphasizing the aesthetic qualities of the displays rather than their cultural history.

Construction of the new museum began at the beginning of 2001 and was completed in 2005. The Musée du Quai Branly was inaugurated on 20 June 2006 and opened to the public on 23 June.

== Name ==
The museum opened under the name Musée du Quai Branly, after the street alongside which it is built, a quay of the Seine named for the scientist Édouard Branly. Earlier suggestions were Musée du Trocadéro, after the home of the Musée de l'homme where it was initially to be located, Musée des arts premiers ('first arts', corresponding to the politically incorrect "primitive art"), or Musée [de l'homme,] des arts et des civilisations' ("museum of [man,] the arts and civilizations"). The location-based name was chosen to avoid controversy over terminology, although cynics felt it was a temporary name that would make it easier to rename it later after Jacques Chirac, the president who instigated the project. In June 2016 Jacques Chirac was appended to the museum's name.

== Collections ==
The museum contains the collections of the now-closed Musée national des Arts d'Afrique et d'Océanie and the ethnographic department of the Musée de l'Homme, plus recently acquired objects. The permanent collection has 300,000 works, 700,000 photographs, 320,000 documents, 10,000 musical instruments, and 25,000 pieces of textile or clothing. The main collections area displays about 3500 objects, rotating 500 each year. The museum presents both permanent exhibitions and large temporary exhibits that change every six months. It also offers thematic exhibits featuring masks and tapa cloth from Oceania, costumes from Asia, and musical instruments and textiles from Africa.

Temporary exhibits at the Museum touch upon a wide variety of subjects and themes. Themes of the exhibits in the summer of 2014 included the history and culture of tattoos, propaganda posters from Vietnam, and an exhibit about the influence of the culture of Oceania on American popular culture in the 20th century. This last exhibit, called "Tiki Pop", featured films, posters, music, clothing, and a recreation of a Polynesia-themed "tiki bar" from the 1960s.

Among its collections of ethnographic objects from Africa, Asia, America and Oceania, the museum has notable collections of objects, gathered during the French colonization of North America, from Quebec to Louisiana, in the 17th and 18th centuries. Another group of items presents the role of women voyagers in the 18th and 19th centuries. It also has a collection of paintings by Aboriginal Australians, in particular paintings made on eucalyptus tree bark. A small selection of the museum's objects was first displayed in 2000 in the Pavillon des Sessions of the Louvre Museum. In December 2025, 77 artworks of this selection were included in the newly designed Gallery of the Five Continents. Juxtaposing artworks from all continents, this new gallery presents non-European artistic traditions alongside Western art in a global narrative of world cultures.

== Selected objects from the collections ==
=== African collection ===
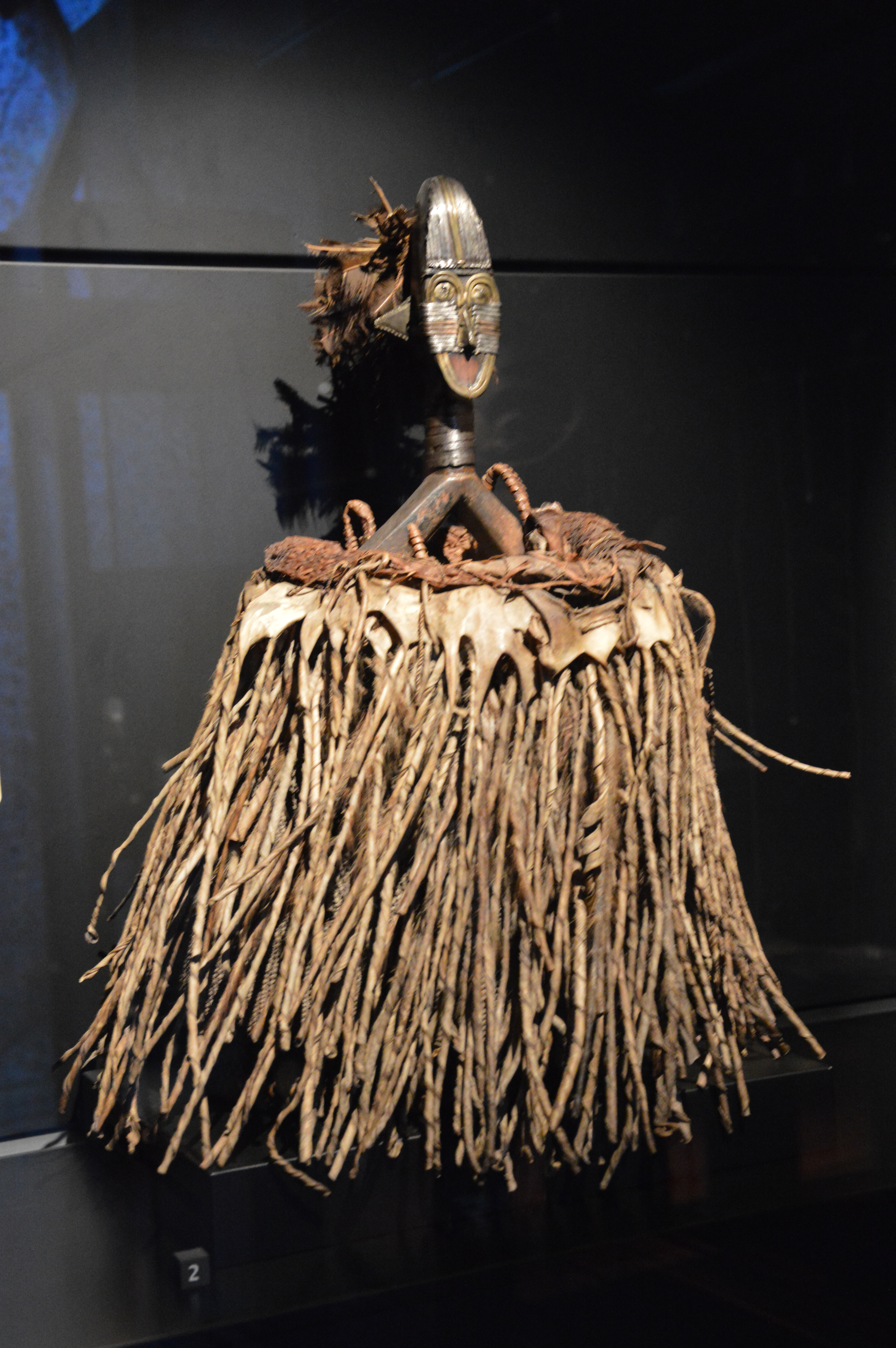
A reliquary from the Sango people of Gabon (19th century)

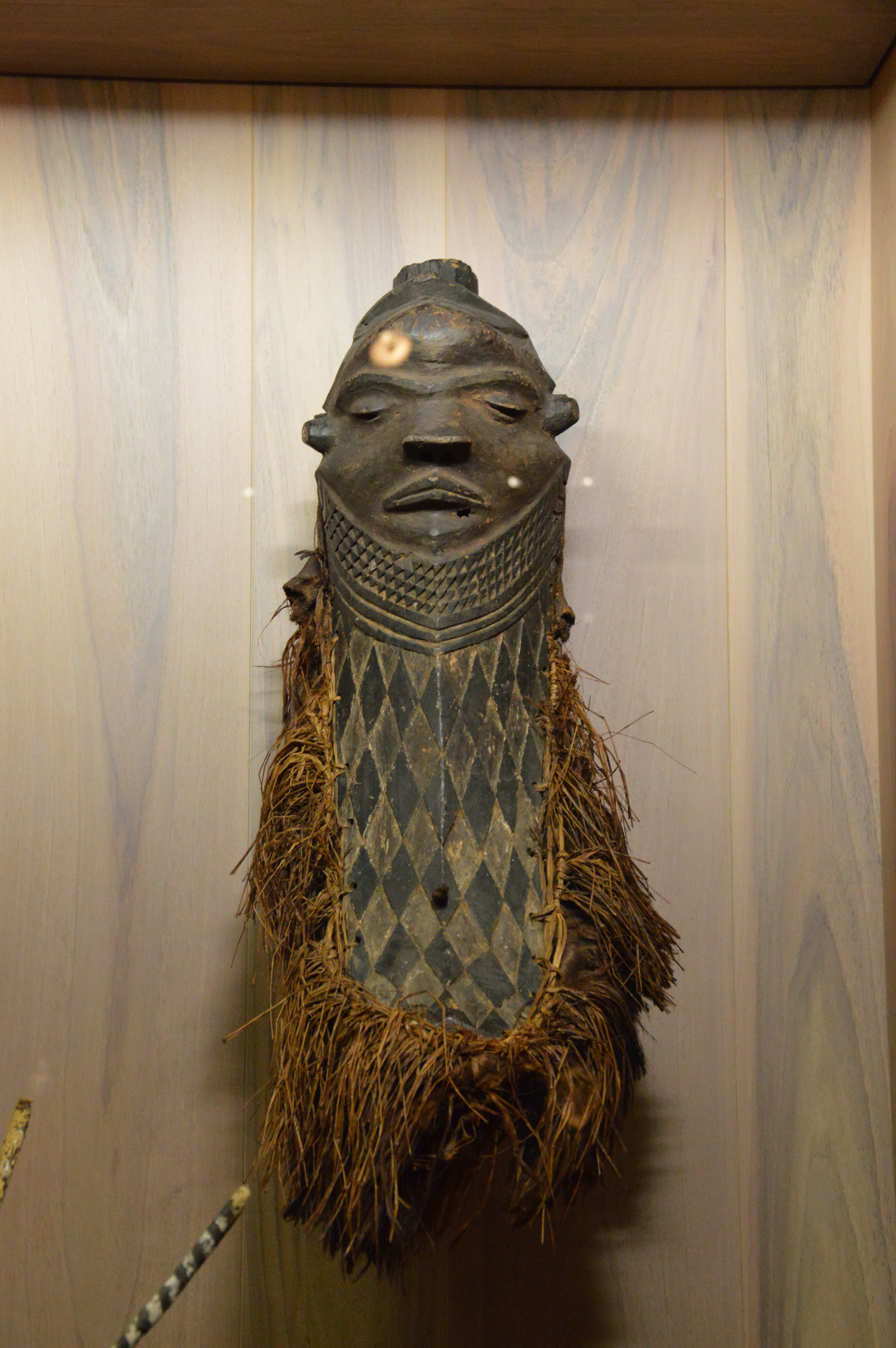
Mask from the Pende people of Congo (20th century)

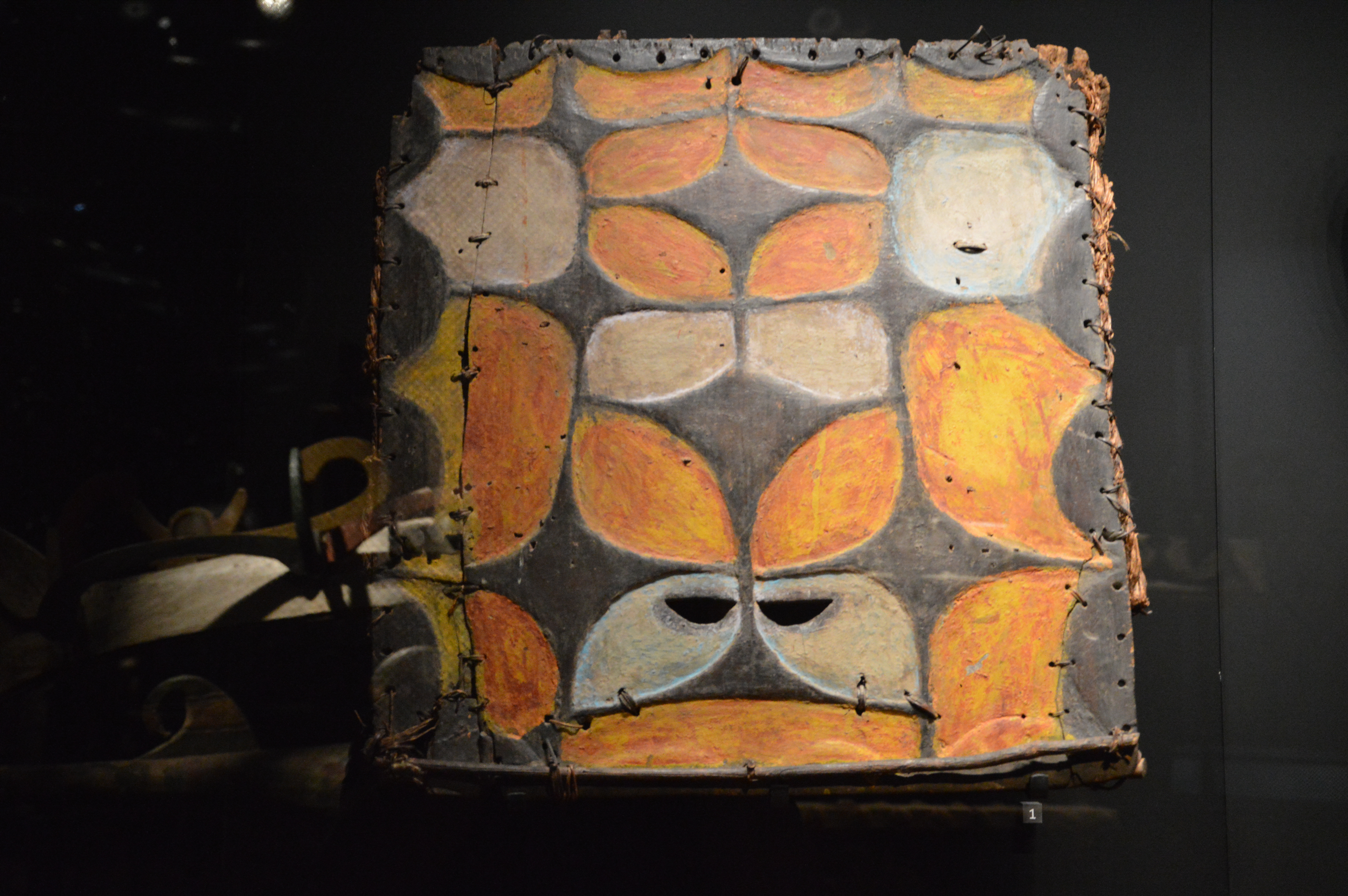
Mask from Eket people, Nigeria (20th century)

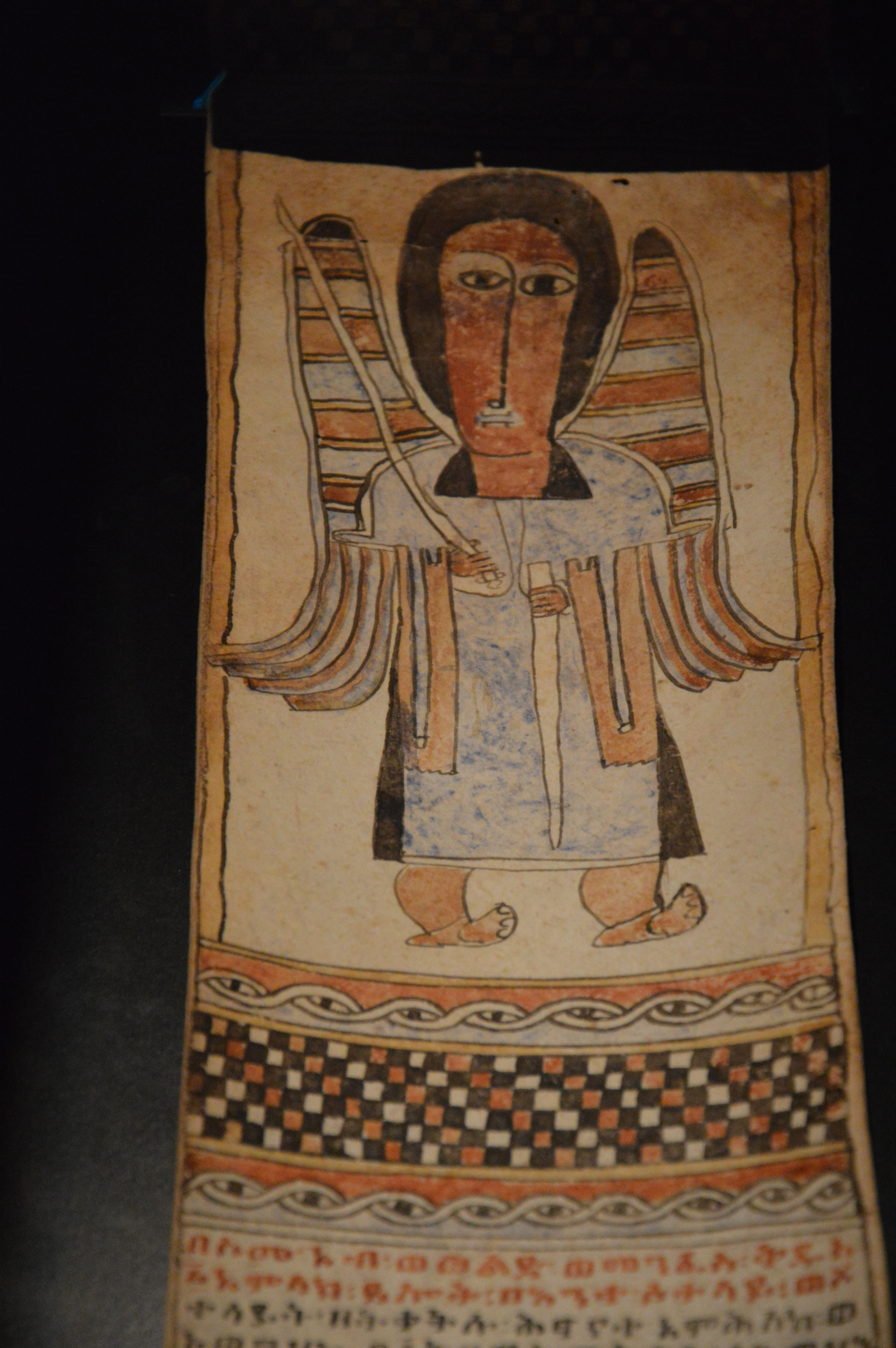
Guardian angel, Ethiopia (19th century)

=== Asian collection ===
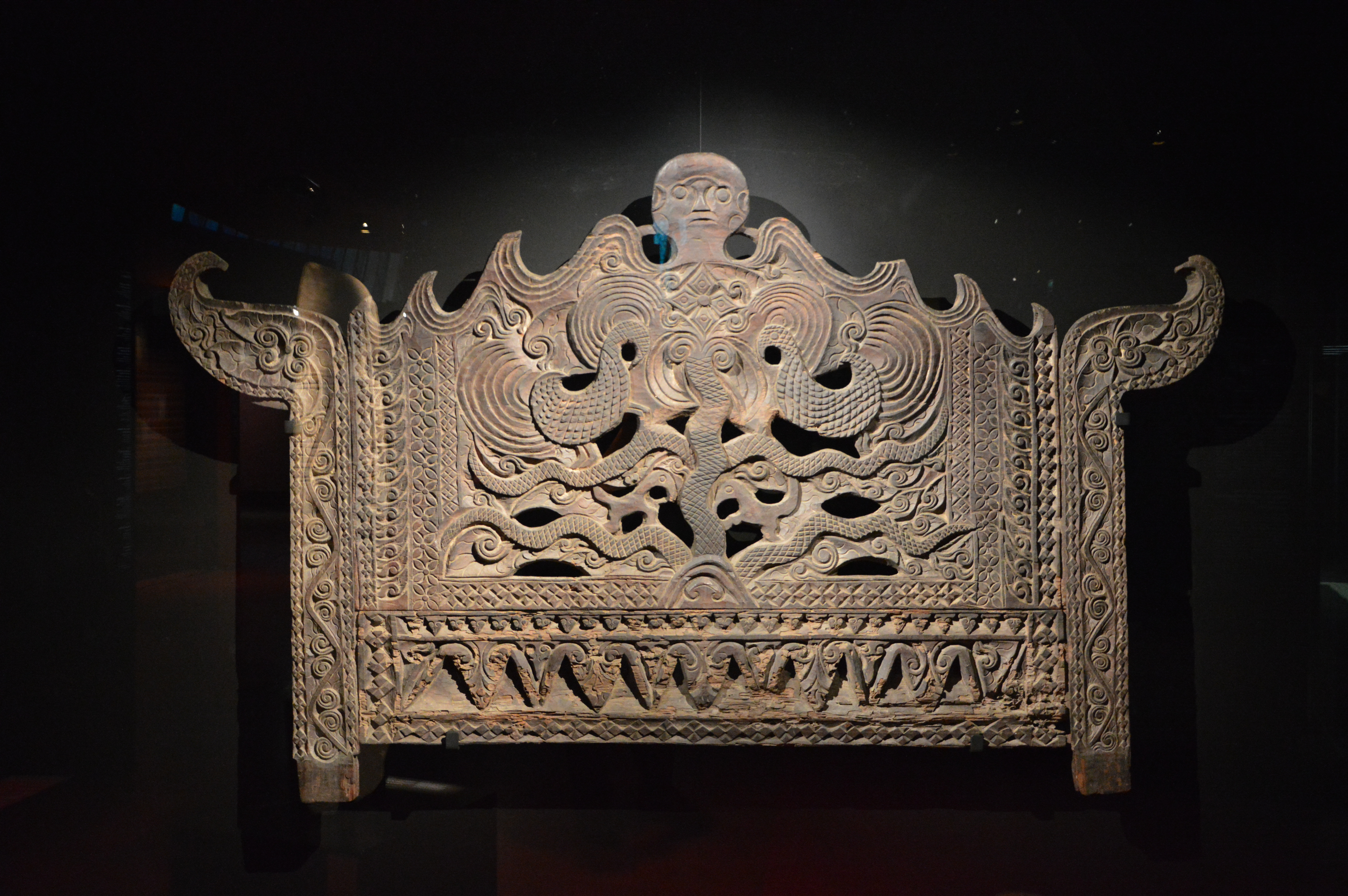
Back of a seat of honor, from the Abung people of the island of Sumatra in Indonesia (19th century)

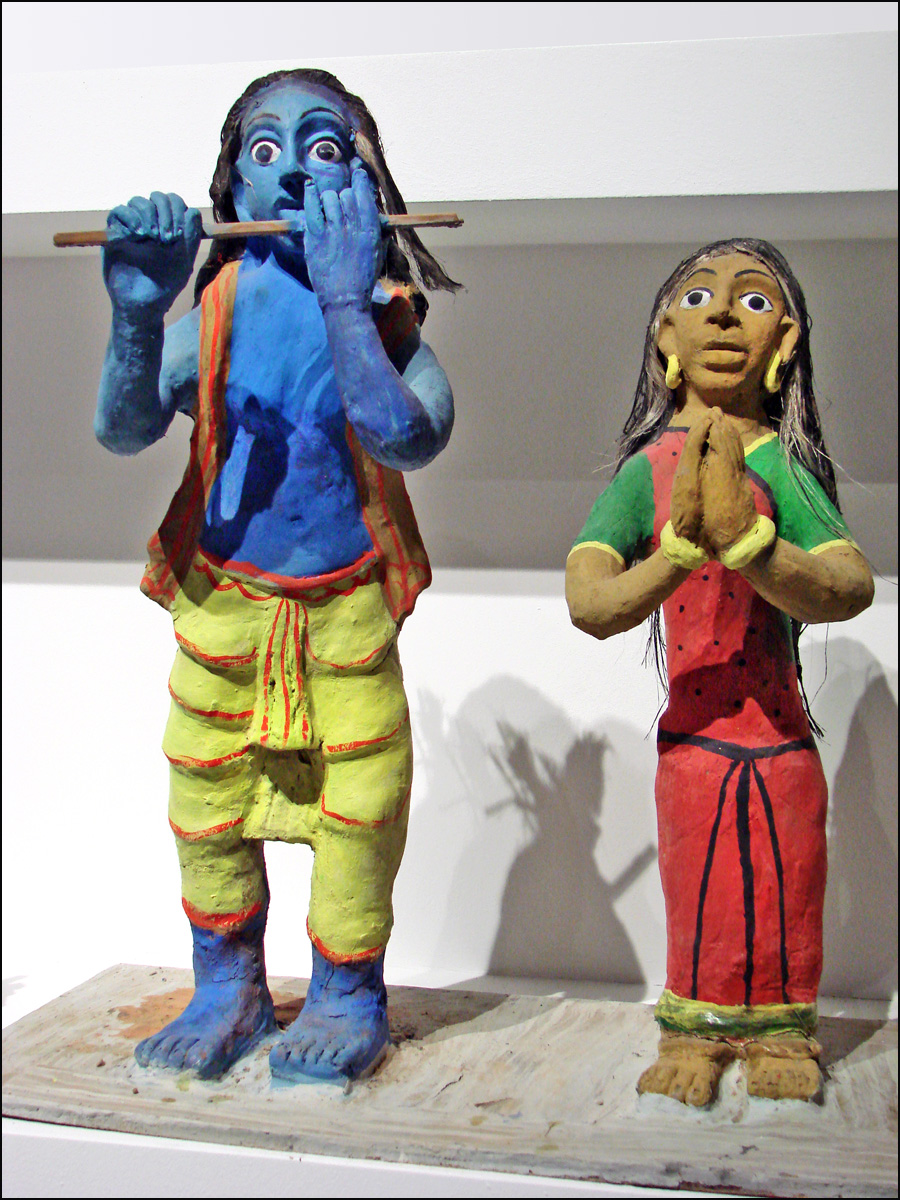
Figurines by Sundaribai from Surguja district in Chhattisgarh, India (20th century)

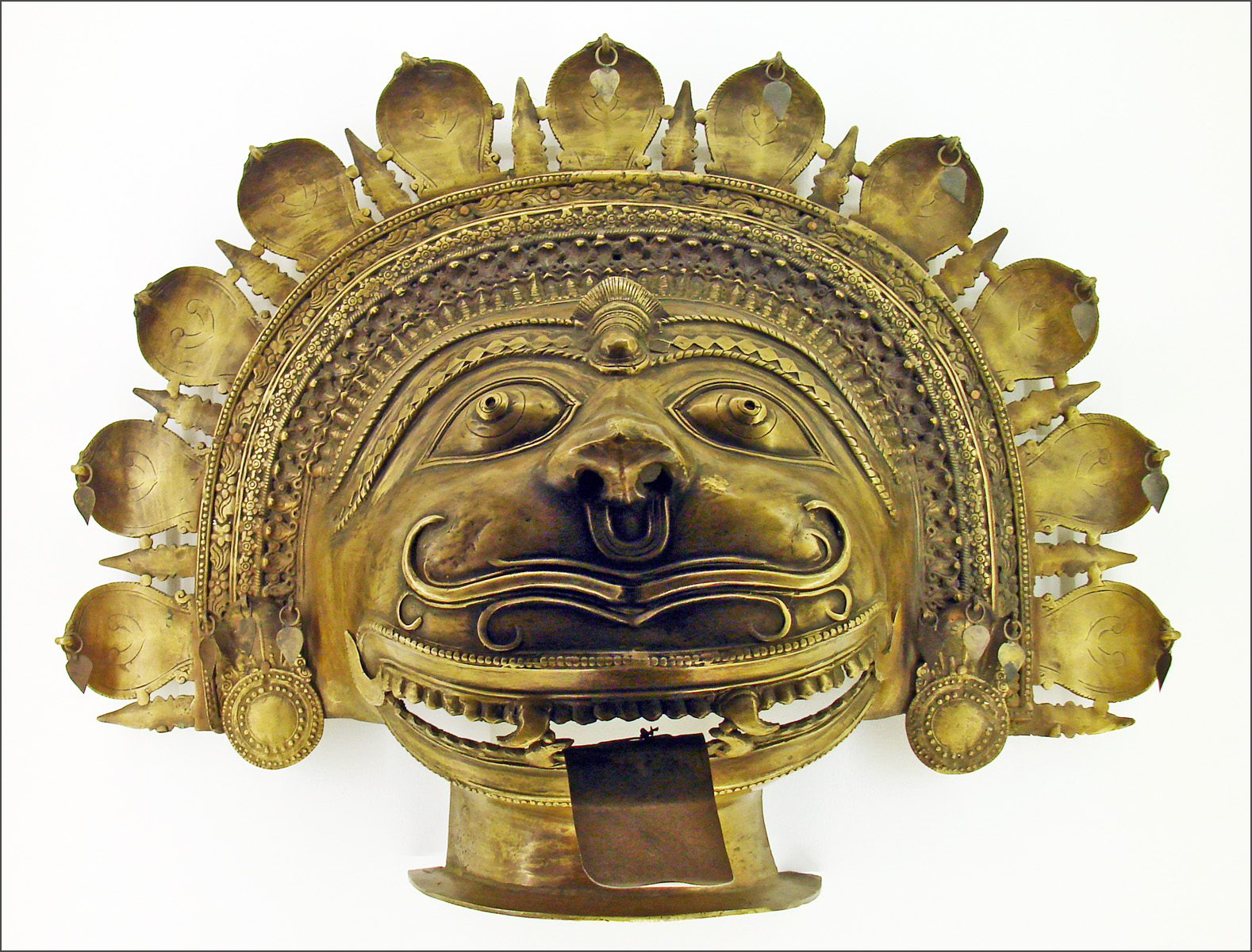
Ritual mask from India (20th century)

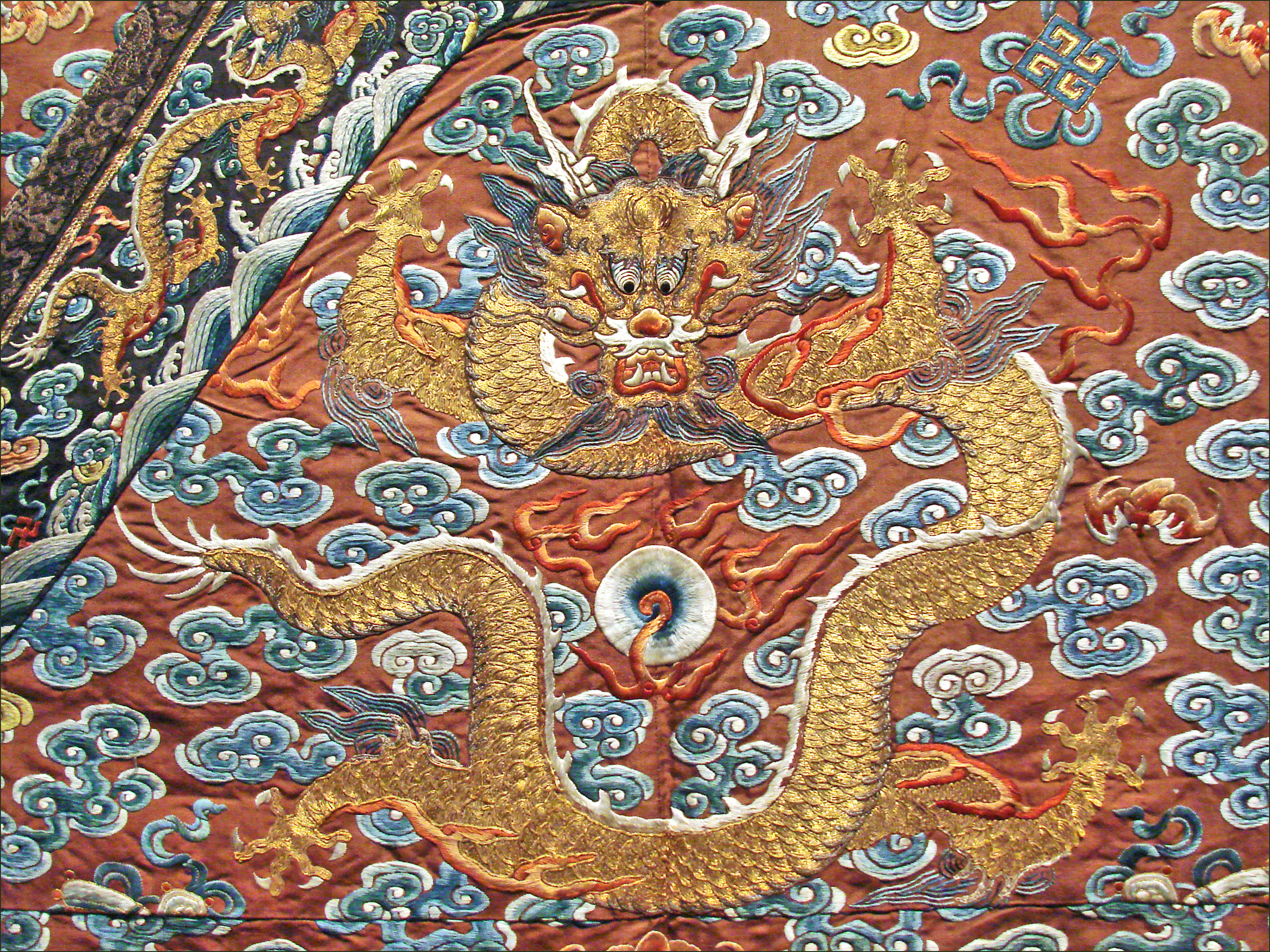
Robe of a dignitary, China (19th century)

=== Americas collection ===
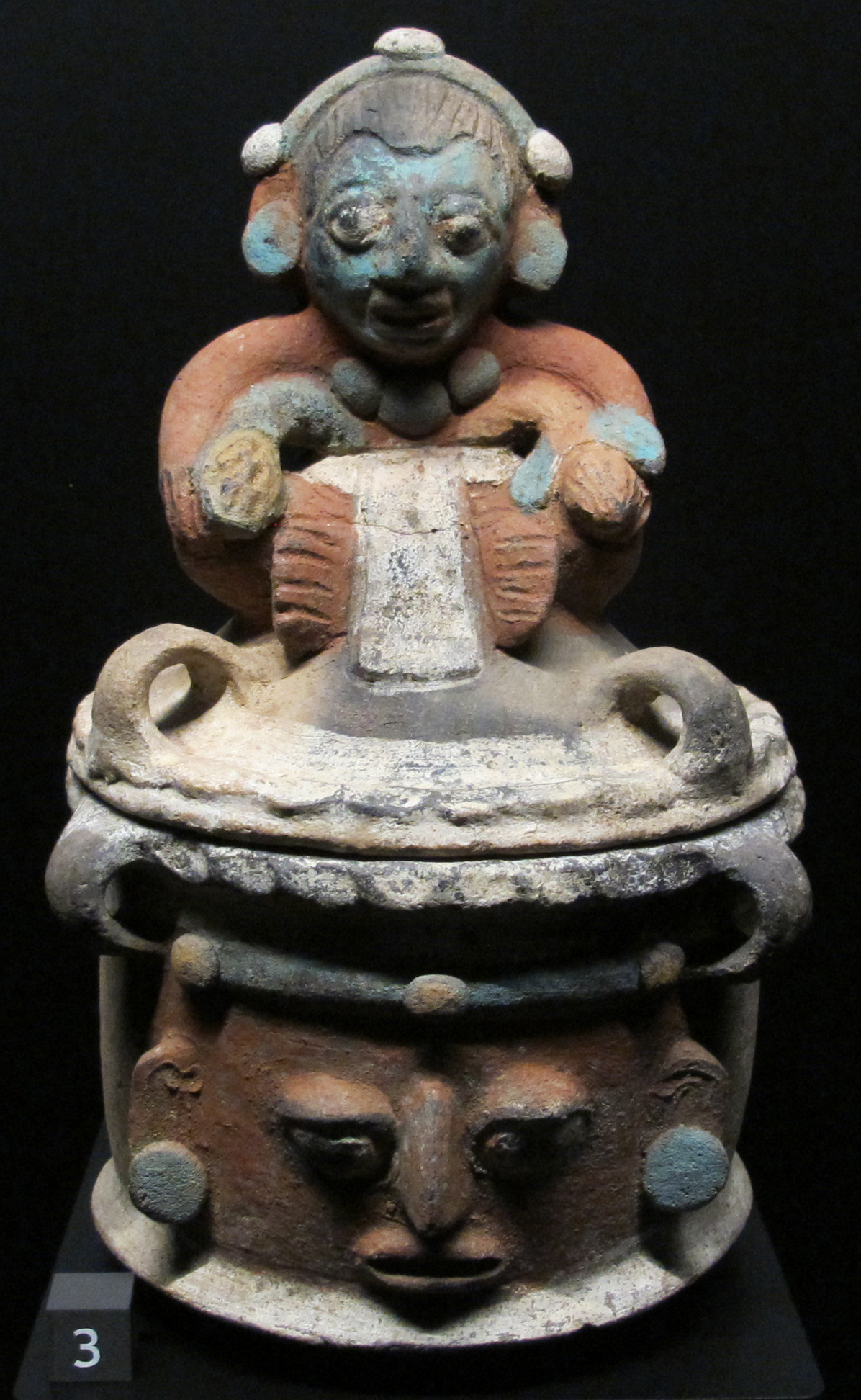
Mayan container from Guatemala, AD 600–800

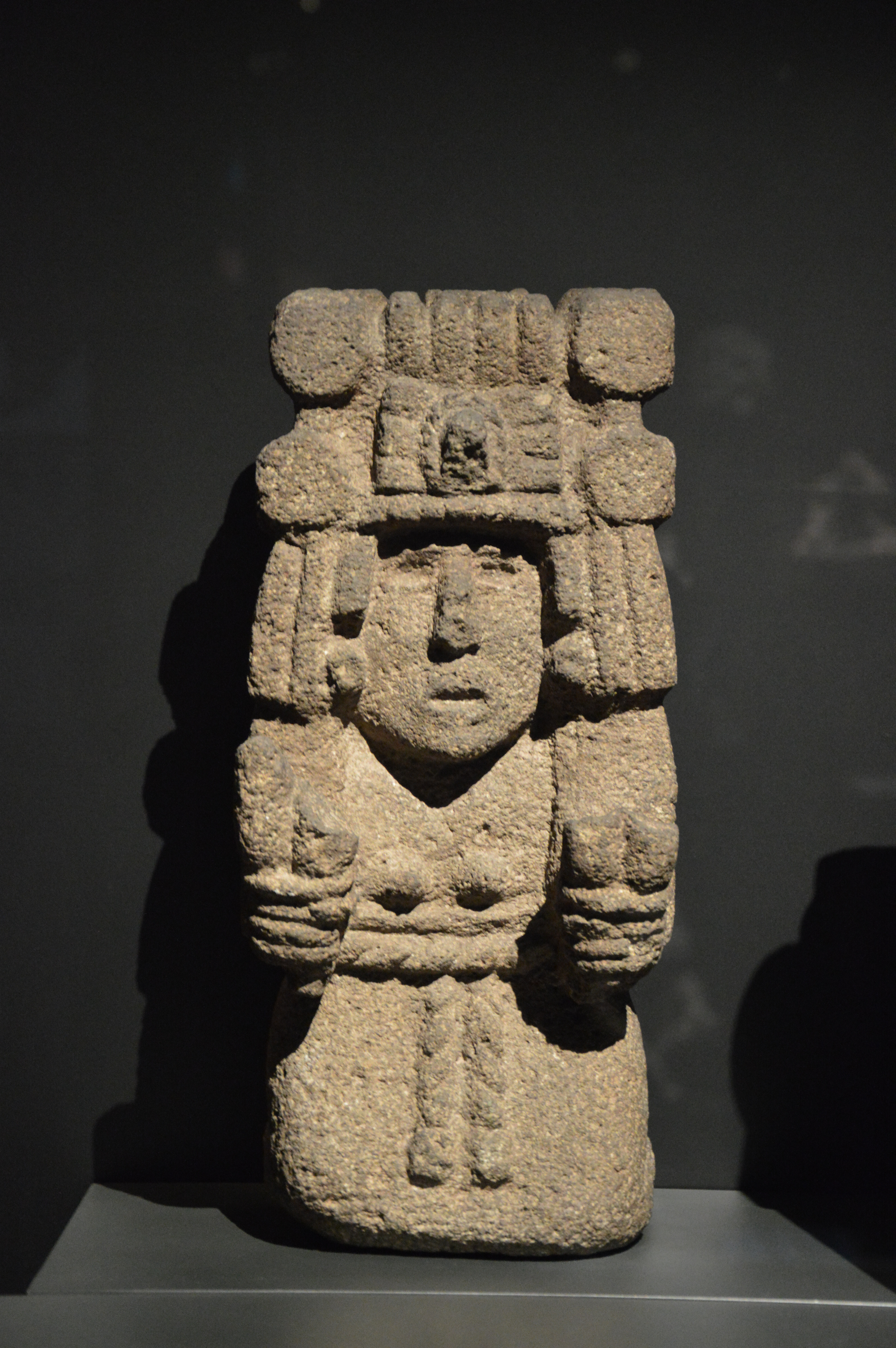
Aztec image of Chicomecōātl, goddess of corn

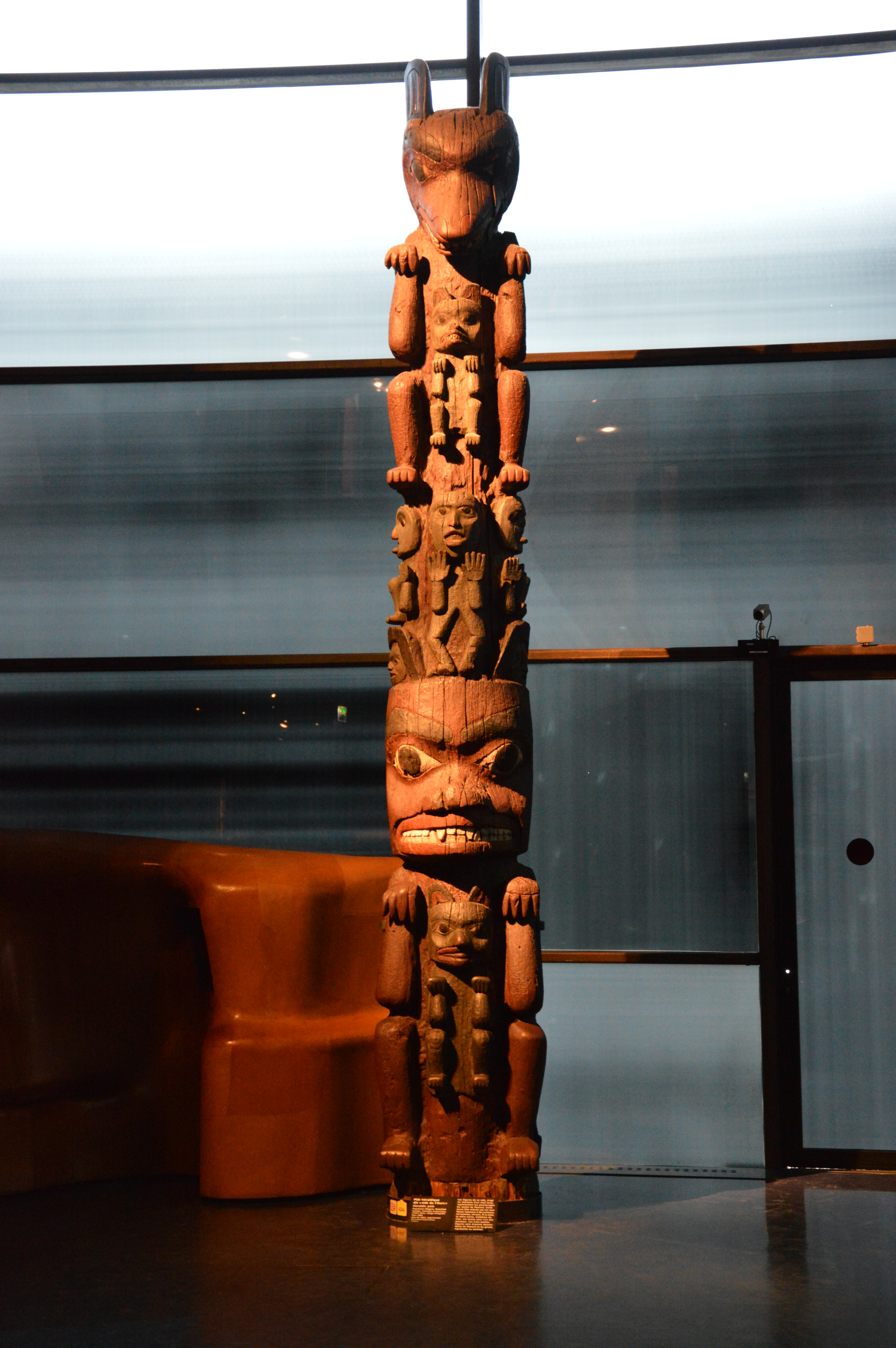
A heraldic mast, or totem pole, from the Nisgaʼa people in British Columbia, Canada (1890)

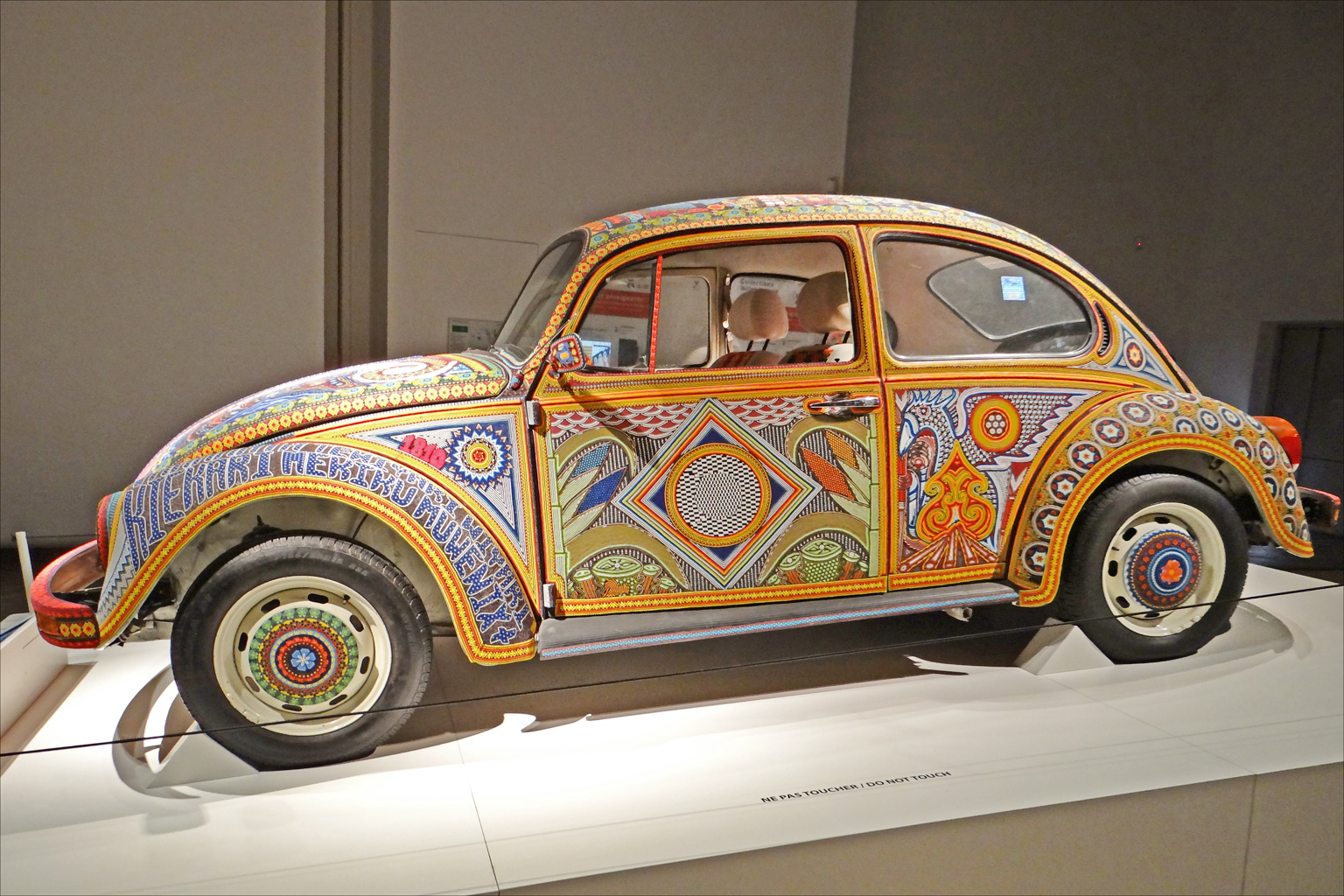
Decorated car from Mexico (20th century)

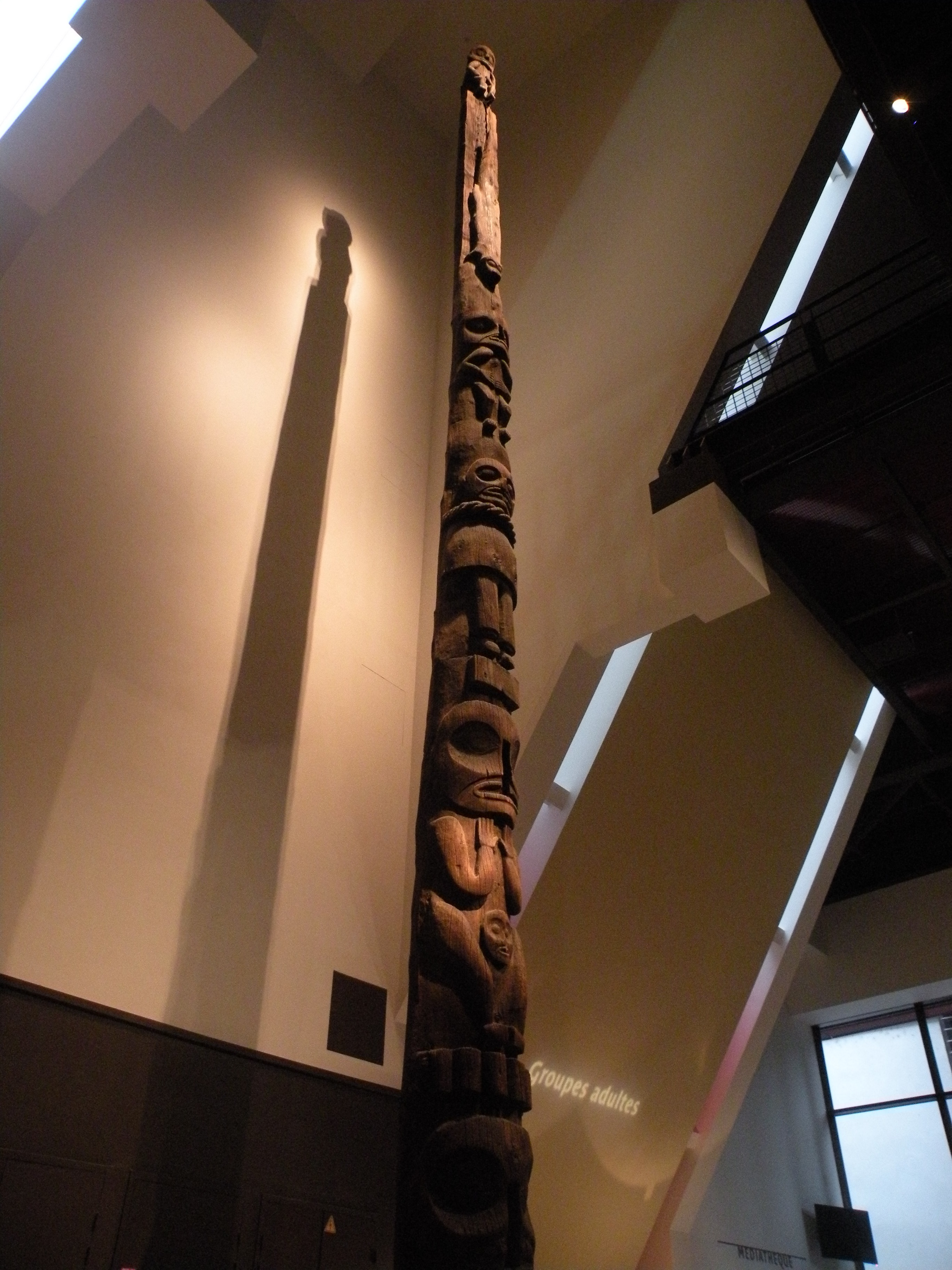
The Kʼëgit pole, a Wetʼsuwetʼen totem pole from the 1860s

=== Oceania collection ===
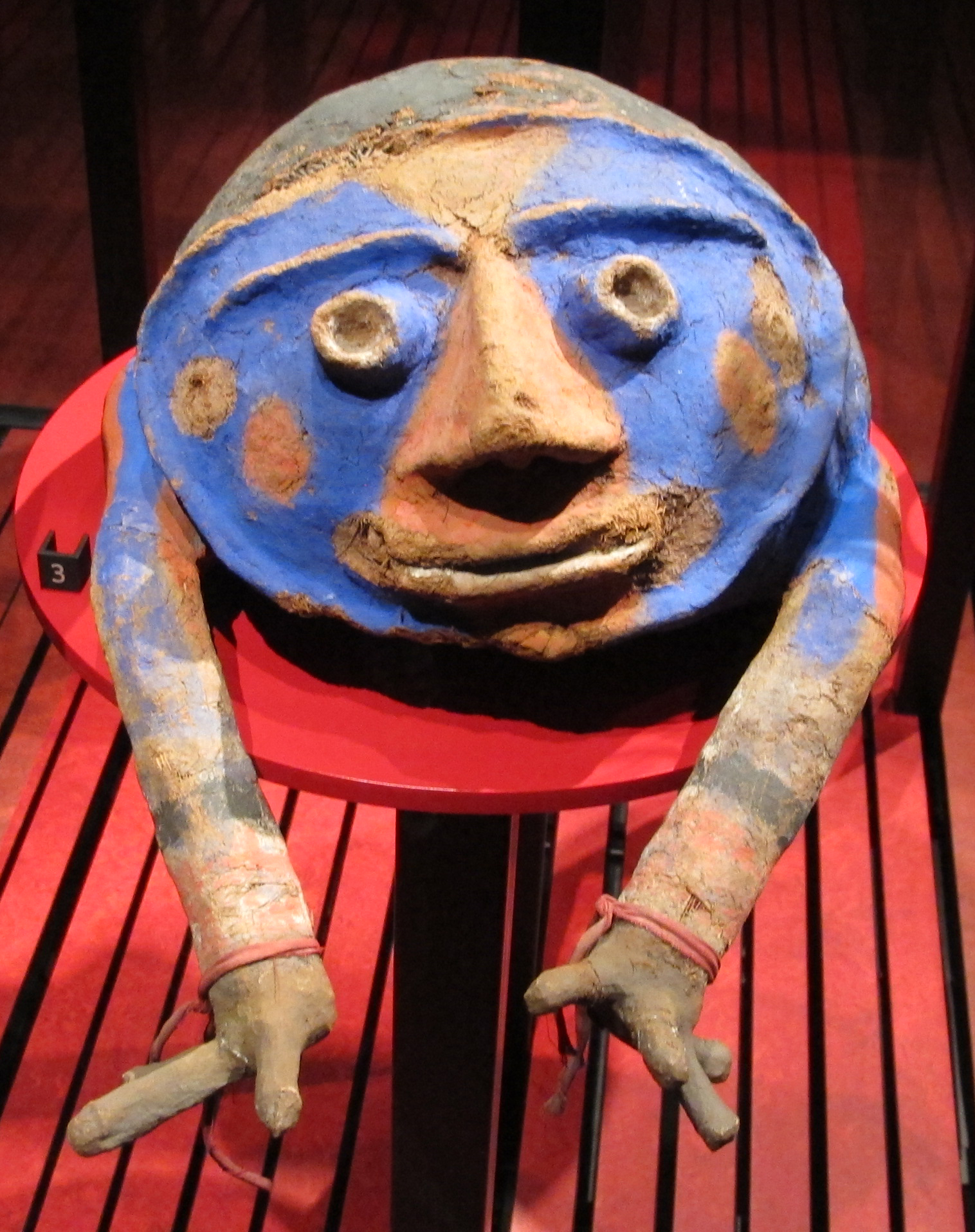
A mask from Vanuatu, from the south of the island of Malekula. (20th century)

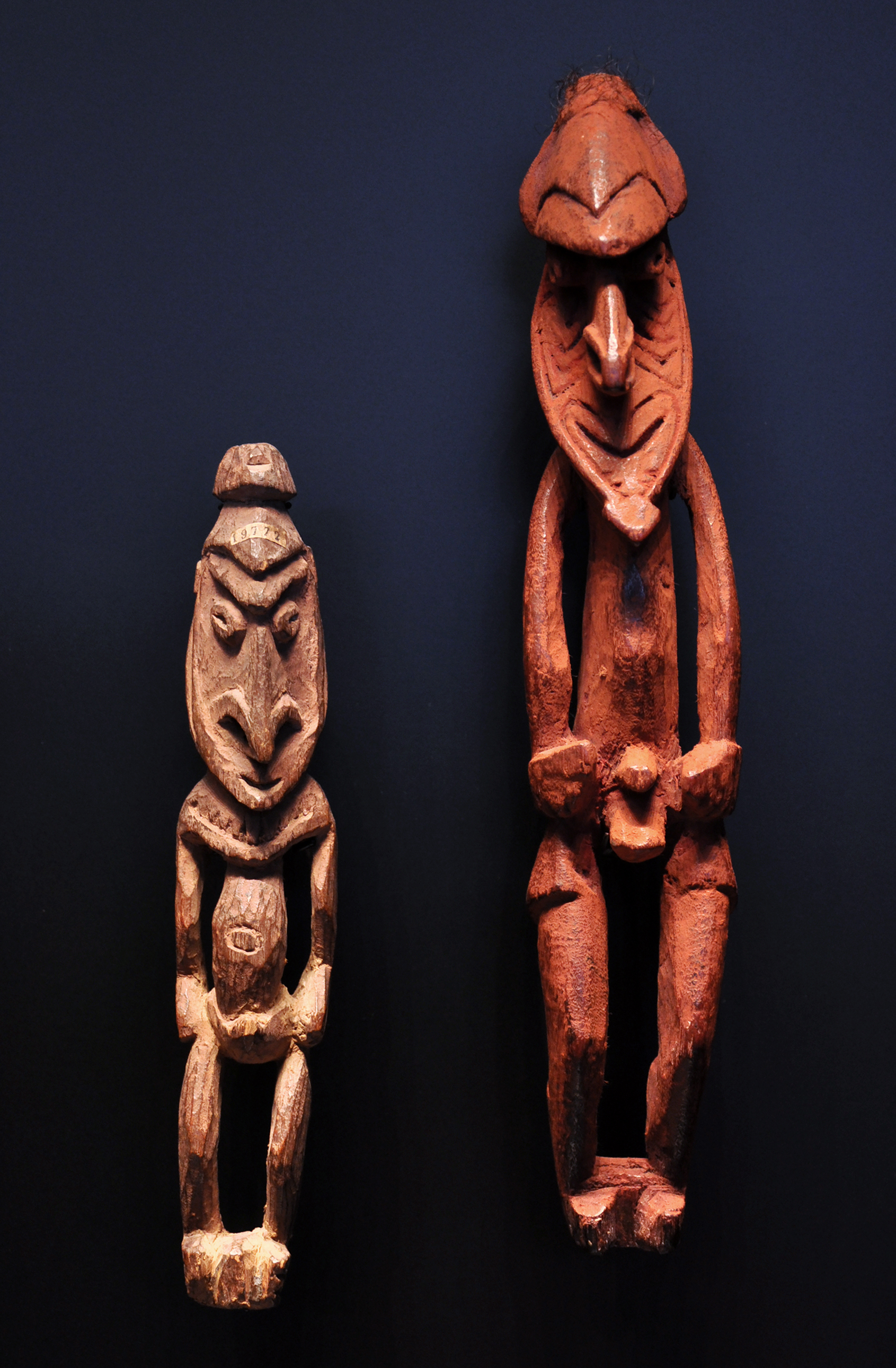
Carved wooden figurines from Papua New Guinea (20th century)

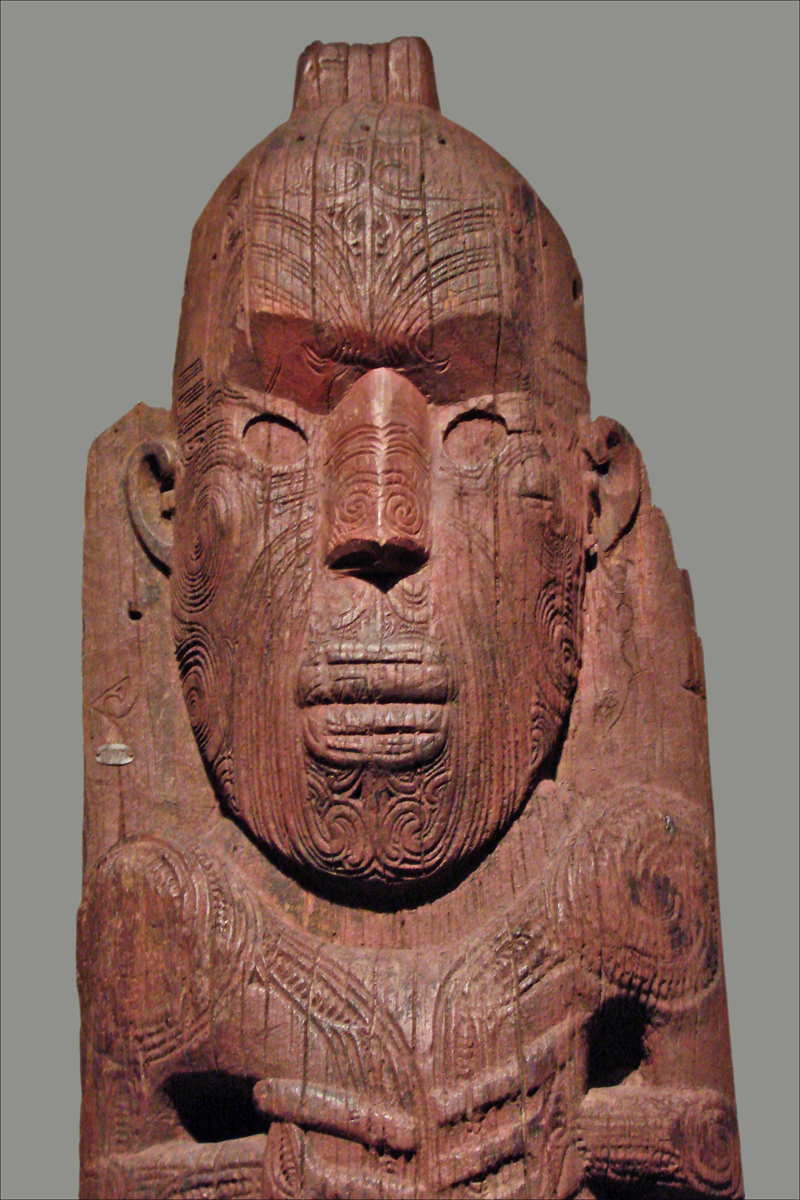
Māori sculpture from New Zealand (1850)

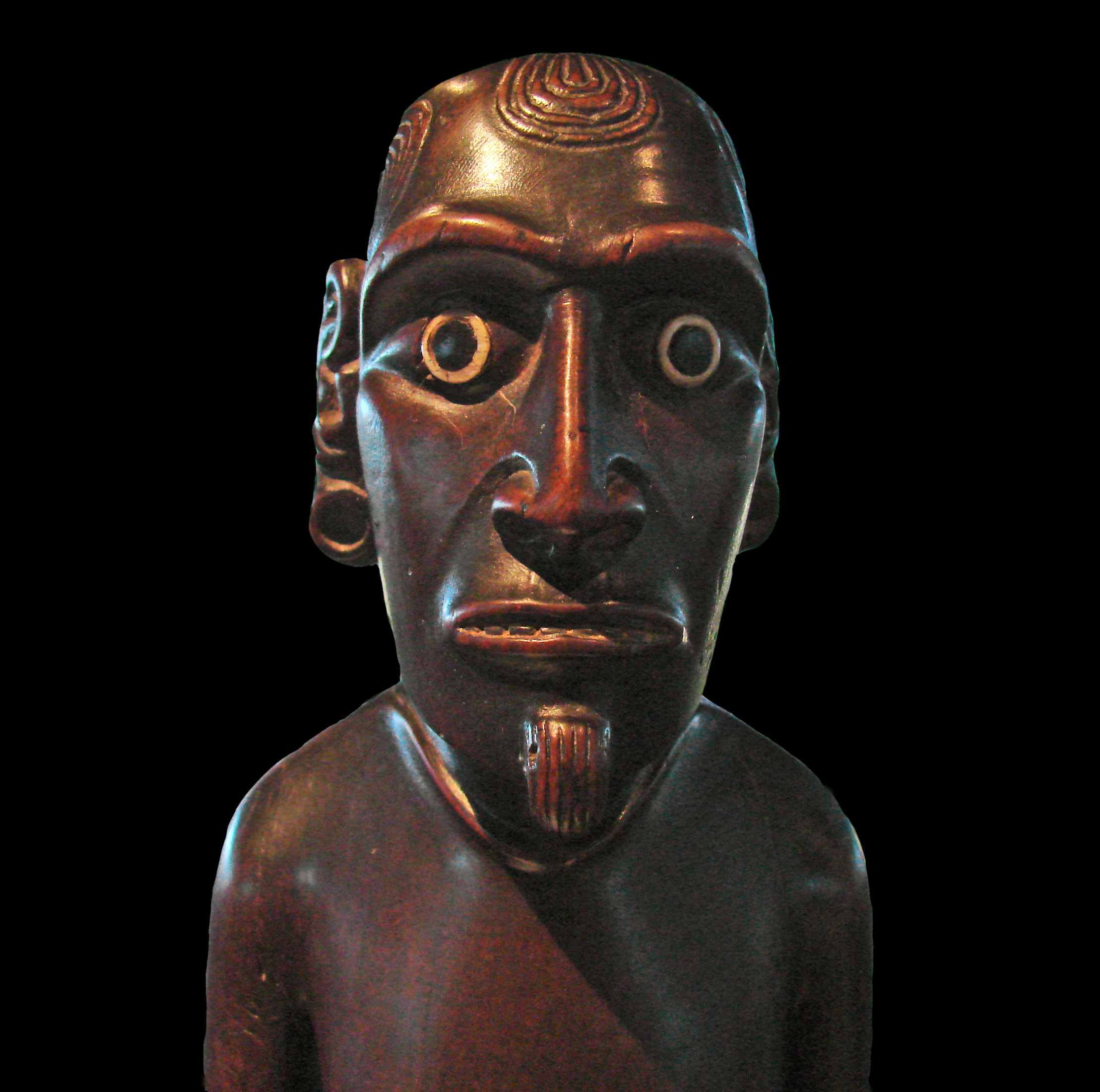
Statue from Polynesia (1760–1860).

== Buildings ==
Musée du Quai Branly

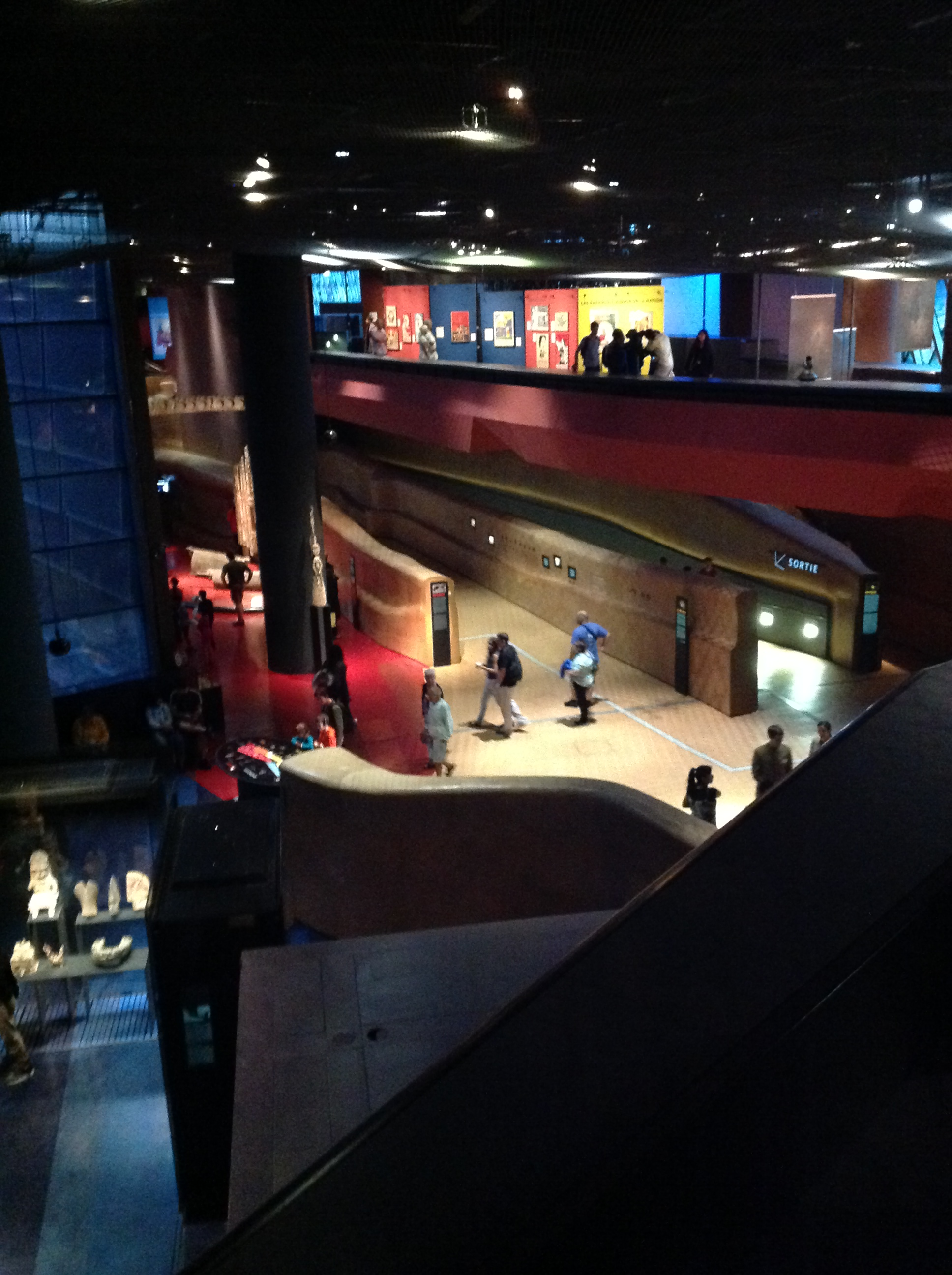
The main galleries and the mezzanine of the museum, connected by a winding ramp

The museum complex has four buildings, occupying 30,000 square metres (320,000 sq ft), which, along with the garden, cost 233 million euros to construct.

- The main building containing the galleries of the museum is 210 metres (690 ft) long and covers 4,750 square metres (51,100 sq ft), and has a 3,000-square-metre (32,000 sq ft) terrace on the roof, the largest roof terrace in Paris. It is constructed like a huge bridge, 10 meters over the garden, supported by two large concrete silos at the east and west ends and by 26 steel columns. As the trees of the garden around the building grow, the columns will be completely hidden and the building will appear to be resting on the treetops.

Visitors enter the main building through a small entrance, and then follow a winding ramp up a gentle slope to the main gallery, two hundred meters long. The main gallery is relatively dark inside, with a small amount of sunlight entering from outside, and with direct lighting only on the exhibited objects from the permanent collection. Thirty different galleries are placed on the north side, which are visible on the outside of the structure as boxes of different colours. Three mezzanines look down on the main gallery; the center mezzanine is the multimedia center, and the other two mezzanines are used for temporary exhibits. The west mezzanine has a new exhibition every 18 months, while the exhibition on the east mezzanine changes each year. The garden side of the building contains an auditorium, classrooms, lecture hall, multimedia library and a bookshop.

- The separate Branly building contains administrative offices, and has 140 work spaces on five floors. Its most unusual feature is the green wall, or wall of vegetation, composed of living plants, on the north side of the building, facing the Seine.
- The Auvent building, connected by footbridges with the Branly building, has 60 work spaces, and houses the Jacques Kerchache lecture hall and an archive of 700,000 photographs and sound recordings.
- The building on the rue de l'Université contains the museum's workshops and library. The ceilings and façade of the building are decorated with the works of eight Indigenous Australian contemporary artists, four men and four women: Ningura Napurrula, Lena Nyadbi, Judy Watson, Gulumbu Yunupingu, John Mawurndjul, Paddy Nyunkuny Bedford, Michael Riley and Yannima Tommy Watson.

== Théâtre Claude Lévi-Strauss ==
The auditorium, named after notable French cultural anthropologist Lévi-Strauss, is situated under the main hall and is also accessible from the garden. It was designed by Jean Nouvel with the cooperation of Ducks Scéno for the scenography and Jean-Paul Lamoureux for its acoustics. This auditorium is used for concerts, film shows or public conferences. It allows several configurations thanks to acoustic curtains conceived by Issey Miyake.

== Gardens ==
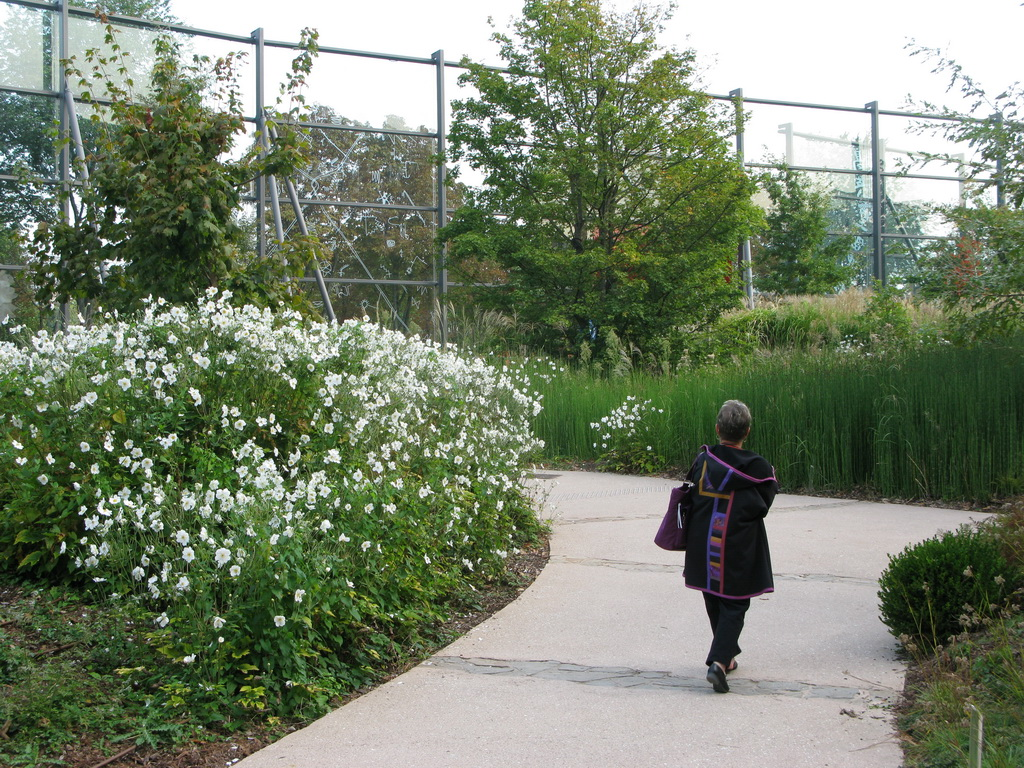
A winding path in the north garden of the Quai Branly museum. The glass wall blocks the noise of traffic on the Quai.

In the original project for the museum, 7,500 square meters of the 25,000-square-meter site were set aside for gardens. The winning architect, Jean Nouvel, increased the size of the gardens to 17,500 m^{2}. They were designed by landscape architect Gilles Clément, and present the exact opposite of a traditional French formal garden: There are no fences, no lawn, no gates, no monumental stairway; instead, Clément composed a tapestry of small gardens, with streams, hills, pools, and groves, using the native French plants and imported plants accustomed to the Paris climate. Originally, 169 trees and 72,000 plants were planted.

On the north side, facing the street along the Seine, the garden is protected by a high double wall of plate glass, which blocks most of the sound from the street. The gardens on the north side practically hide the museum building. Instead of straight paths and a long axis to the entrance, the paths wind through the gardens, with no apparent destination.

Another notable feature of the Museum garden is the green wall, or wall of vegetation, created by botanist Patrick Blanc. This living wall of greenery covers 800 m^{2} of the façades of the museum, and 150 m^{2} of the interior walls. It includes 15,000 plants of 150 different varieties, coming from Japan, China, the Americas and Central Europe.

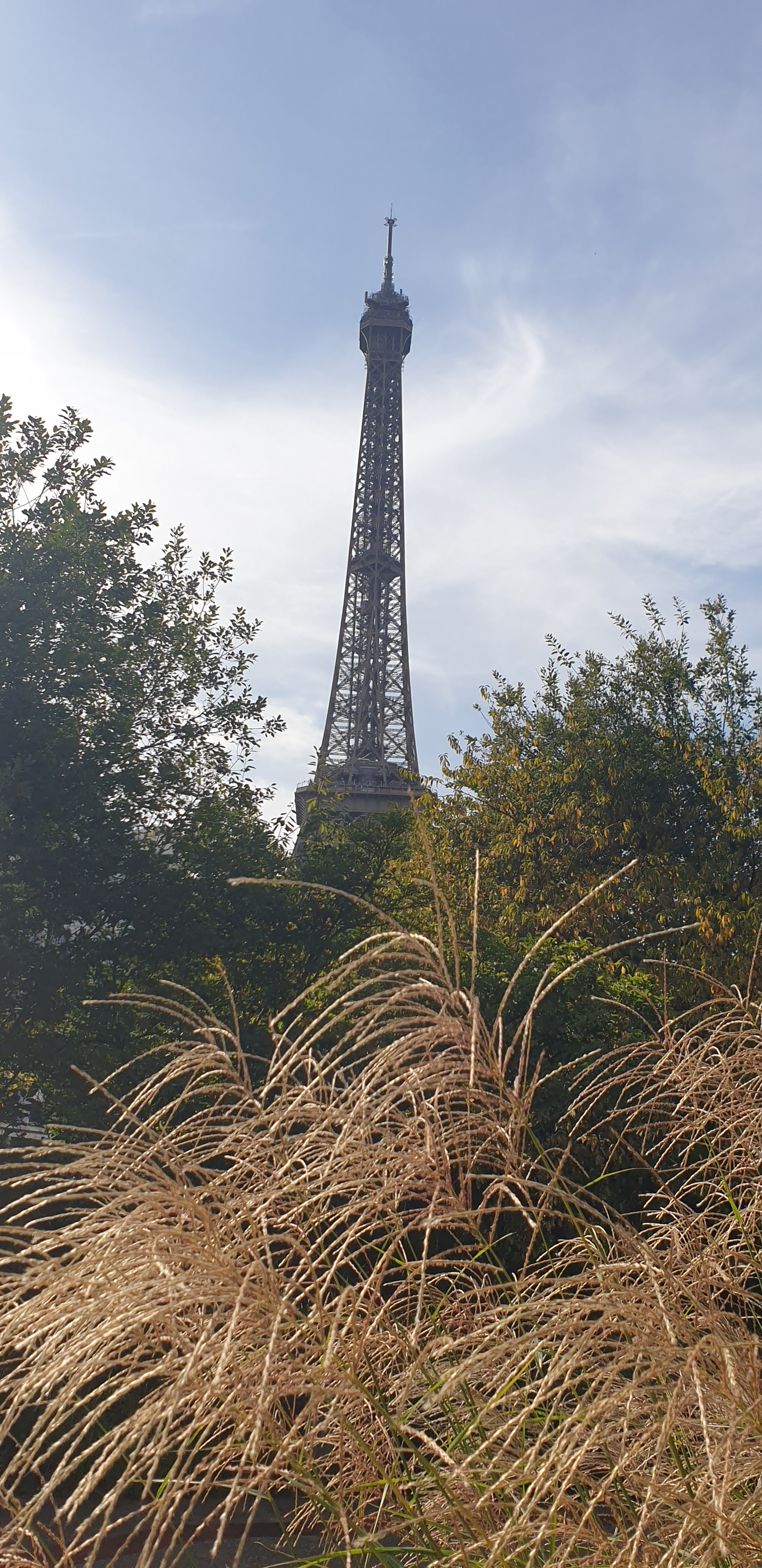
Eiffel Tower seen from the Musée du Quai Branly garden

== Media library ==
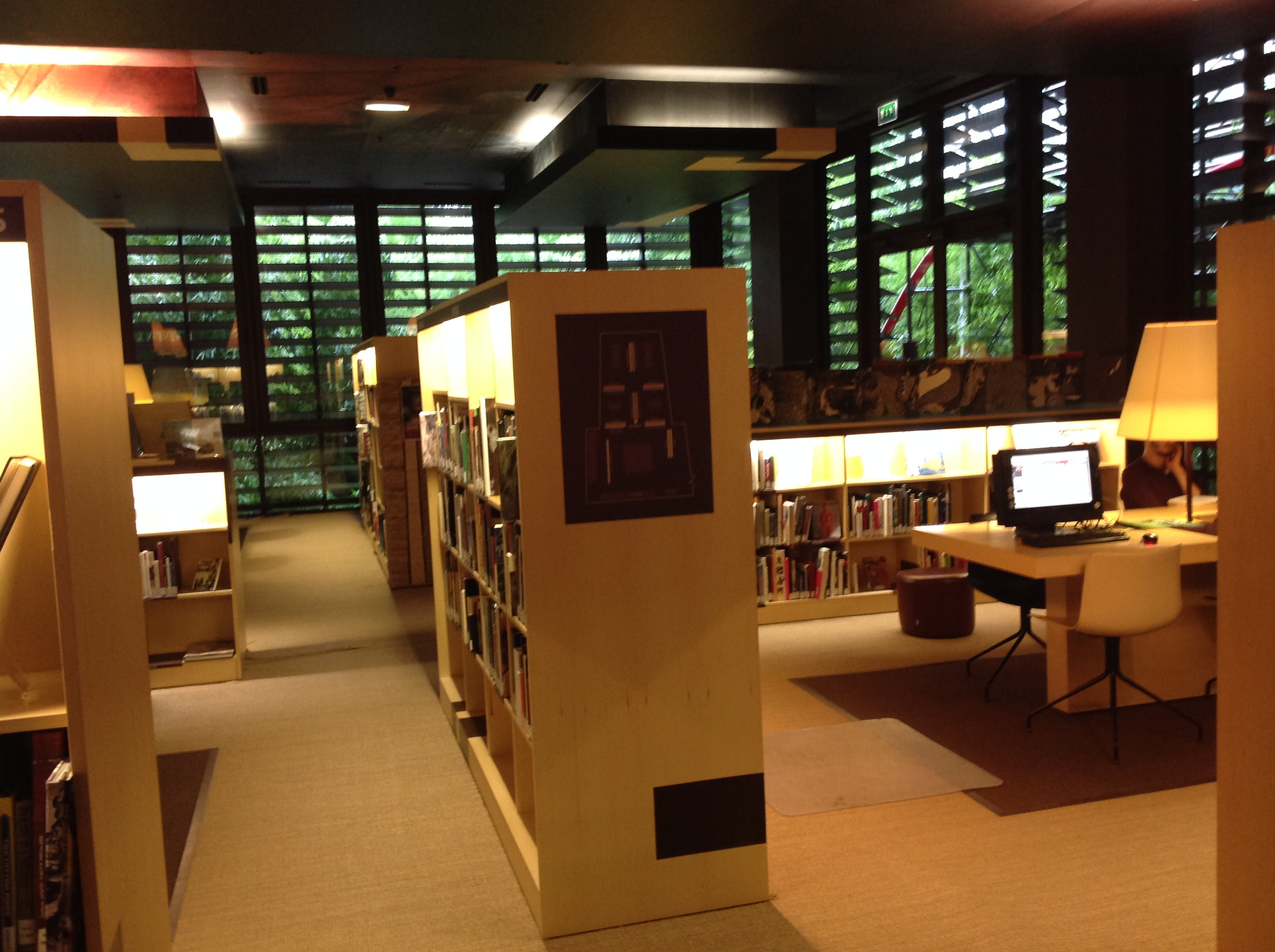
The Jacques Kerchache reading room of the Musée du Quai Branly

The museum has a media library with 3 main departments:

- the collection for books and other print media, with two reading rooms—a research reading room on the top floor and a public access reading room on the ground floor
- the image collection with photographs, posters and drawings
- the archive collection

Many of the specialized scientific journals, data bases, documents, visual or audiovisual objects can be accessed online. Moreover, the library also holds collections from important ethnologists, including Claude Lévi-Strauss, Georges Condominas, Françoise Girard, and Nesterenko, as well as that of art collector Jacques Kerchache.

== Publications ==
The museum has published catalogues and various other publications, among them:

- Aztèques. La collection de sculptures du musée du Quai Branly, by Leonardo López Luján and Marie-France Fauvet-Berthelot (2005).

It has also co-published several ethnomusicology audio sets, including booklets in both French and English, among which:

- Les Indiens d'Amérique 1960–1961, American First Nations Authentic Recordings 1960–1961
- The Color Line, Les Artistes Africains-Américains et la Ségrégation – 1916–1962
- Haiti Vodou, Folk Trance Possession, Ritual Music From the First Black Republic 1937–1962
- Jamaica – Roots of Rastafari, Mystic Music From Jamaica – Folk, Trance, Possession 1939–1961
- Madagascar, Traditional Music From the South West

== Reception and controversy ==
=== General appreciation vs. criticism of the museum ===
Discussions about the museum's name prior and after its opening reflected criticism about its scope and political viewpoints. In a summary review of 2006 The Guardian reported that the Financial Times appreciated the museum's architectural and curatorial design, praising features such as the layered galleries that create "an animated, occasionally jarring dreamscape". This review characterized the museum as a "real gift" for Paris. The Washington Post called it "visually stunning, inside and out".

Other reviews in public media were more critical: The International Herald Tribune commented on the architecture: "Defiant, mysterious and wildly eccentric, it is not an easy building to love." Newsweek wrote that "the jungle metaphor is so overdone that it starts to seem silly, or condescending". Michael Kimmelman, architecture critic of The New York Times, published a review on 2 July 2006 entitled "Heart of Darkness in the City of Light". He called the museum "a missed opportunity and an inexplicable exercise" and said it was "devised as a spooky jungle, red and black and murky, the objects in it chosen and arranged with hardly any discernible logic. The place is briefly thrilling, as spectacle, but brow-slappingly wrongheaded. [...] The place simply makes no sense. Old, new, good, bad are jumbled all together without much reason or explanation, save for visual theatrics."

In 2007 Bernice Murphy, co-founder of the Sydney Museum of Contemporary Art and later National Director of Museums Australia and Chair of the Ethics Committee of the International Council of Museums was quoted that she found the whole of Quai Branly to be a "regressive museology" and the presentation of Aboriginal art "in a vegetal environment" to be "an exotic mise en scène" in the worst taste.

On the museum's tenth anniversary in 2016, The Art Newspaper highlighted its ambitious role in bringing together vast collections of non-Western art and acknowledged its importance as a cultural institution. The article noted that the museum's founder, Jacques Chirac, was committed to increasing public appreciation of ethnographic collections and the museum's rich permanent holdings. The article noted the 97 temporary exhibitions during the first decade and quoted Steven Engelsman, the director of Vienna's Weltmuseum, who said that the Quai Branly has "worked miracles to increase the public appreciation of ethnographic collections and museums".

Another discussion has focused on what political role the museum has played for the interior and exterior politics of France. At the time the museum opened in 2007, France was attempting to reconcile increasing ethnic diversity among the nation's population within its republican model of assimilation. From this perspective, the museum has been seen as a symbolic effort to reach out to people from non-Western background, while at the same time proclaiming the country's open attitude to the world. Given this supposed motivation behind the museum, there has been some controversy among intellectuals as to what the museum's ultimate purpose is, and whether or not the presentation of the galleries actually achieves this purpose.

=== Debate about the relationship between anthropology and aesthetics ===
Shortly after the museum's opening in June 2006, art historian James Clifford published his impressions concerning the mission and possible future development of the institution. Among other aspects, he commented on the "proper balance between aesthetics and anthropology" and wrote: "In the Musée du Quai Branly, 'illusion' and the 'work of art' coexist uneasily with the realism of ethnography and history." After years of debate on these two approaches to presenting cultural objects in museums, the aesthetic approach has been favored in the museum's design and its presentation of the permanent collection. Stéphane Martin, the founding president of Quai Branly, envisaged a new kind of institution that aims to be more than a traditional art or ethnographic museum. Rather, Martin saw the museum as a cultural centre with multiple functions, serving diverse audiences with different needs and backgrounds. Further, Clifford wrote: "In practice, museums like Quai Branly do not answer to stable constituencies of art connoisseurs or social scientists."

In his 2006 article for The New York Times, Michael Kimmelman said: "The dichotomy between ethnology and aesthetics is too simple. It's not possible to draw a line between form and function, which are inseparably mixed in ways that constantly shift." Further, he asked: "Will religious, ceremonial and practical objects, never intended as art in the modern, Western sense, be showcased like baubles, with no context?"

The anthropologist Nélia Dias referred to these questions with caution by examining the relationship between museum anthropology and general museum practices. In her 2008 article "Double erasures: rewriting the past at the Musée du quai Branly", she wrote: "If the dichotomy of formal presentation versus contextual presentation is no longer relevant to museum anthropology practice, Branly does not seem to solve, in its permanent gallery, the dilemma between anthropology and aesthetics. By contrast, its temporary exhibits attempt to overcome such a dilemma and to open new venues through the display of objects in an historical and cross-cultural perspective. Whether this will lead to a new path remains to be seen."

A 2017 article in the scientific journal Museum Anthropology reported about interviews and observations of museum staff and visitors. This study aimed to provide further insight into the relationship between the museum's approach to presenting its collection either as artworks or as cultural objects in ethnographic ways. According to the study, the museum's design creates an "immersive experience" and visitors have experienced a "disorienting journey through colonial context collections". At the same time, visitors had perceived a lack of historical context as well as reflections on colonialism and cultural disappearance. Further, this had raised questions about the representation and ownership of cultural artifacts.

=== Report on the restitution of African cultural heritage ===
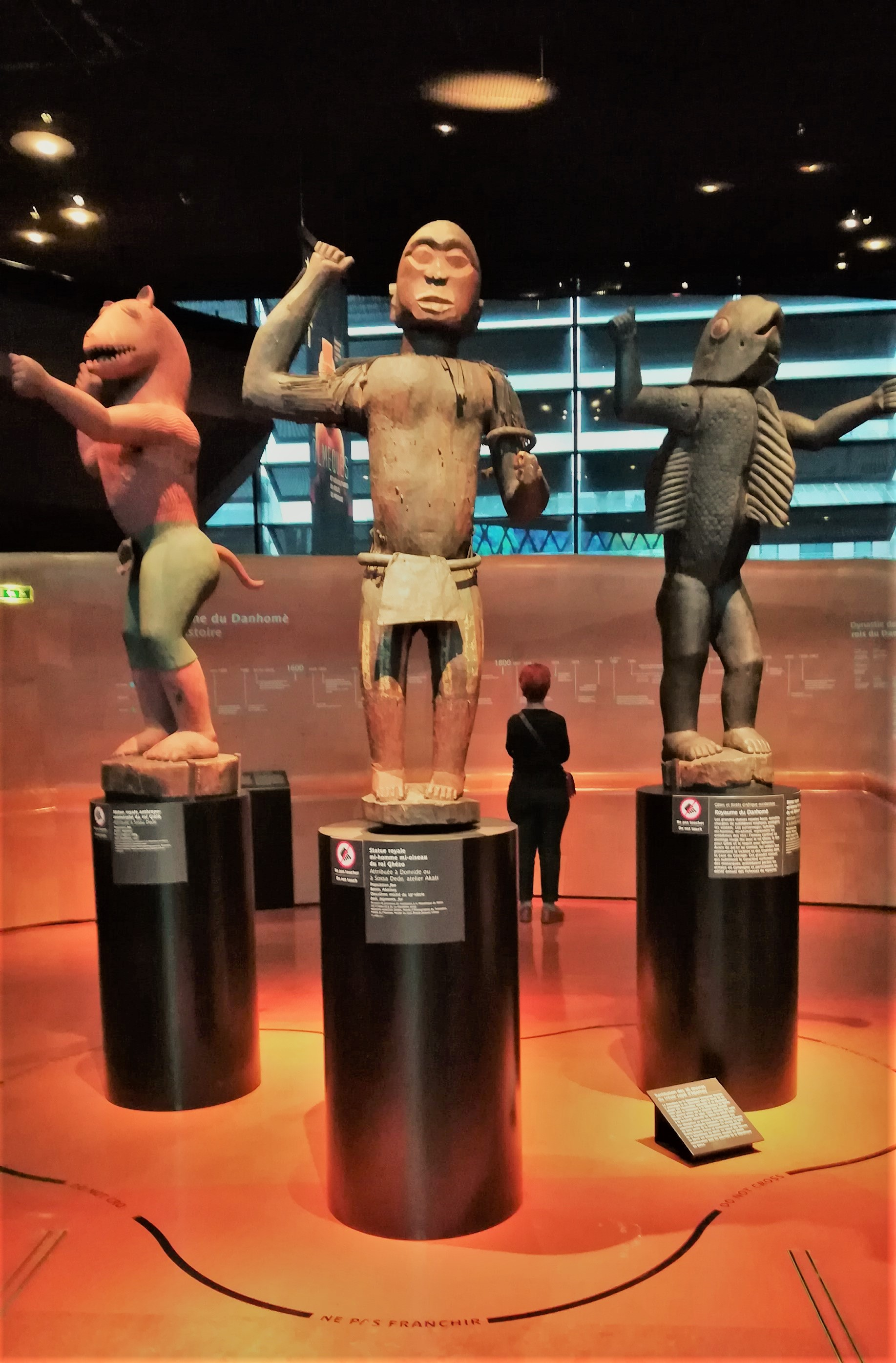
Group of statues from the royal palaces in Abomey, Benin, as exhibited in 2021 before their restitution

In 2018, the museum was at the center of a debate about the repatriation of objects that were removed from former French colonies during the period of colonialism. This was following the release of a report commissioned by President Emmanuel Macron and prepared by two academics, Bénédicte Savoy of France and Felwine Sarr of Senegal, who were asked to draw up a report on the restitution of African cultural heritage. This report argued that artifacts that were taken unlawfully throughout the French colonial period should be returned, if the country in question asks for them. Of the 90,000 sub-Saharan artifacts in France, 70,000 are in the archives or public exhibition of the Quai Branly Museum in Paris.

Following the report's publication, Macron promised to return to the Republic of Benin 26 pieces that were forcibly removed during war from territory in historical Dahomey that now comprises part of Benin, though no French law or legislation existed at the time that would have enabled such a promise. This was a complete shift from preceding French policy on the restitution of cultural objects collected during the colonial period. As an example, in 2016 the French government had refused to return artifacts requested by the president of Benin, on the grounds that the French national collections are "inalienable", i.e. no part of them could be given away.

By late 2021, the 26 objects were ready to be returned to Benin and the museum hosted a final exhibition on this occasion, including lectures, discussions and historical documentary films. Since the publication of the Sarr/Savoy report, the international discussion about restitution of looted cultural heritage has gained new momentum, and major museums and other collections not only in France have intensified restitutions and their cooperation with African institutions and art historians.

=== Controversies ===
The MQB was involved in a controversy over the return of Maori tattooed heads held in France and known as mokomokai. The controversy arose after a museum in Normandy decided to return a tattooed head to New Zealand. Since 2003, the Te Papa Tongarewa, New Zealand's national museum, had embarked on a program of requesting the return of Maori remains held in institutions around the world. While the MQB was initially reluctant to return the mokomokai to New Zealand, a change in French law in 2010 allowed for discussions which resulted in repatriation. The mokomokai were formally returned to New Zealand on 23 January 2012 and they are now housed at Te Papa, but are not on display.

In 2024, the Parliament of the Central Tibetan Administration criticized the museum for removing the word "Tibet" from its catalogues and exhibitions in favor of the Chinese government term "Xizang Autonomous Region." The use of the name "Xizang" was considered an "historical fraud" in an article publish by a group of Asian scholars published on 3 September 2024 in the French newspaper Le Monde. By the end of September, the Musée du Quai Branly had formally apologised to a delegation of six Tibetan activist groups and said it will revert to using the description "Tibet".

== See also ==
- Guimet Museum of Asian Arts, Paris
- List of museums in Paris
- List of largest art museums
