= Hagwilget Canyon =

Canyon in British Columbia, Canada

Coordinates: 55°15′00″N 127°37′00″W

Hagwilget Canyon is a canyon on the Bulkley River of northwestern British Columbia, Canada, located several kilometres upstream from that river's confluence with the Skeena River at Hazelton, at the Wet'suwet'en village of Hagwilget.

Originally spelled Awillgate Canyon the name was changed to Hagwilget Canyon to conform to the spelling used for the village of Hagwilget, which was also known as Rocher Déboulé ("fallen rock"), due to a rockslide in this area which blocked salmon migration up the Bulkley. The Rocher Déboulé Range is nearby.

== See also ==
- Hagwilget Canyon Bridge
