= List of First Nations governments in British Columbia =

This is a list of First Nations governments (also band governments) in the Canadian province of British Columbia. "First Nation" refers to the Indigenous peoples in Canada who are neither Inuit nor Métis. In the context used here, it refers only to band governments. For a list of peoples and ethnicities please see List of First Nations peoples in British Columbia (which includes extinct groups). For a list of Indian Reserves, see List of Indian reserves in British Columbia.

Government	alternate names	name of people(s)	ethnicity	language(s)	Tribal Council affiliation(s)	location(s)
Acho Dene Koe First Nation		Acho Dene Koe	Dene		Carrier Sekani Tribal Council & Dehcho First Nations	
Ahousaht First Nation		Ahousaht	Nuu-chah-nulth-aht	Nuu-chah-nulth language	Nuu-chah-nulth Tribal Council	Ahousaht, Clayoquot Sound
Aitchelitz First Nation		Stó꞉lō	Coast Salish	Halqemeylem	Sto:lo Nation	Chilliwack
Ashcroft First Nation	Ashcroft Indian Band		Nlaka'pamux	Nlaka'pamuxtsin	Nlaka'pamux Nation Tribal Council	Ashcroft
Blueberry River First Nations			Dane-zaa	Dane-zaa language		
Boothroyd Indian Band			Nlaka'pamux	Nlaka'pamuxtsin	Nlakaʼpamux Nation Tribal Council	Boothroyd's
Boston Bar First Nation			Nlaka'pamux	Nlaka'pamuxtsin	Nlaka'pamux Nation Tribal Council	Boston Bar
Bridge River Indian Band	Xwisten First Nation		St'at'imc	St'at'imcets	Lillooet Tribal Council	Lillooet
Campbell River First Nation	Wei Wai Kum	Laich-kwil-tach	Kwakwaka'wakw	Kwak'wala	Kwakiutl District Council	Campbell River
Carcross/Tagish First Nation		Tlingit, Tahltan	Tlingit, Tahltan			
Cayoose Creek First Nation	Sekwelwas First Nation, Cayoose Creek Indian Band		St'at'imc	St'at'imcets	Lillooet Tribal Council	Lillooet
Champagne and Aishihik First Nations			Dene			
Chawathil First Nation		Stó꞉lō	Coast Salish	Halqemeylem	Sto:lo Nation	
Cheam First Nation	Cheam Indian Band	Stó꞉lō	Coast Salish	Halqemeylem	Sto:lo Nation	
Cheslatta Indian Band	Cheslatta First Nation	Cheslatta people	Dakelh	Carrier language	Carrier Sekani Tribal Council	Cheslatta Lake
Ch'iyáqtel First Nation	Tzeachten First Nation		Sto:lo	Halqemeylem	Sto:lo Nation	
Coldwater Indian Band	Coldwater First Nation		Nlaka'pamux	Nlaka'pamuxtsin	Nicola Tribal Association	Merritt
Cook's Ferry Indian Band	Cook's Ferry First Nation		Nlaka'pamux	Nlaka'pamuxtsin	Nicola Tribal Association	Spences Bridge
Cowichan Tribes						
Da'naxda'xw Awaetlatla Nation			Da'naxda'xw-Awaetlatla	Kwakwaka'wakw	Kwak'wala	Port Hardy
Dease River First Nation						
Ditidaht First Nation		Ditidaht	Nuu-chah-nulth-aht	Nuu-chah-nulth	non-member affiliate of Nuu-chah-nulth Tribal Council	Nitinat
Doig River First Nation	Doig River Indian Band					
Douglas First Nation	Port Douglas First Nation	Xa'xtsa	St'at'imc	St'at'imcets	In-SHUCK-ch Nation	Port Douglas
Dzawada̱'enux̱w First Nation	Tsawataineuk First Nation	Tsawataineuk	Kwakwaka'wakw	Kwak'wala	Musgamagw Tsawataineuk Tribal Council	
Ehattesaht First Nation		Ehattesaht	Nuu-chah-nulth-aht	Nuu-chah-nulth language	Nuu-chah-nulth Tribal Council	
Esk'etemc First Nation	Alkali Lake First Nation	Esketemc	Secwepemc, Tsilhqot'in	Secwepemctsin, Tsilhqot'in	Unaffiliated	Alkali Lake
Esquimalt First Nation		Lekwungen	Coast Salish	Lekwungen		Victoria
Fort Nelson First Nation						Fort Nelson
Gitsegukla Indian Band						
Gitanyow First Nation		Gitxsan	Gitxsan	Gitxsan language		
Gitga'at First Nation	Hartley Bay	Gitga'at	Tsimshian	Tsimshian language	Tsimshian Tribal Council	Hartley Bay
Gitxaala Nation		Kitkatla	Tsimshian	Tsimshian language		
Glen Vowell Indian Band						
Gwa'sala-'Nakwaxda'xw Nation	Gwa'sala, 'Nak'waxda'xw (Nahwitti)		Kwakwaka'wakw	'Nak̕wala Kwak'wala	Kwakiutl District Council	
Gwawaenuk Tribe			Kwakwaka'wakw	Kwakʼwala	Musgamagw Dzawada'enuxw Tribal Council	
Halfway River First Nation			Dunneza	Dunneza	Treaty 8 Tribal Association	Peace River Country
Hagwilget Village Council			Gitxsan	Gitxsan language		
Haisla Nation			Haisla	Haisla		Kitimat
Halalt First Nation						
Heiltsuk Nation		Heiltsuk	Heiltsuk	Heiltsuk dialect		Bella Bella
Hesquiaht First Nation		Hesquiaht	Nuu-chah-nulth-aht	Nuu-chah-nulth language	Nuu-chah-nulth Tribal Council	
High Bar First Nation	High Bar Indian Band	Llenlleney'ten	Secwepemc, Tsilhqot'in	Secwepemc language, Tsilhqot'in language		Fraser Canyon north of Lillooet
Homalco First Nation	Homalco Indian Band	Homalco	Mainland Comox	Comox language		
Hupacasath First Nation		Hupacasath	Nuu-chah-nulth-aht	Nuu-chah-nulth language	Nuu-chah-nulth Tribal Council	
Huu-ay-aht First Nation		Huu-ay-aht	Nuu-chah-nulth-aht	Nuu-chah-nulth language	Nuu-chah-nulth Tribal Council	Ohiaht
Iskut First Nation	Iskut Indian Band		Tahltan	Tahltan language		Iskut, British Columbia
Kanaka Bar First Nation	T'eqt'aqtn'mux		Nlaka'pamux	Thompson language	Fraser Canyon Indian Administration	Kanaka Bar
Katzie First Nation	Katzie Indian Band	Stó꞉lō	Coast Salish	Halqemeylem		Pitt Meadows, Langley, Barnston Island
Kitasoo/Xaixais First Nation					Wuikinuxv-Kitasoo-Nuxalk Tribal Council	
Kitselas First Nation		Kitselas	Tsimshian	Tsimshianic languages	Tsimshian First Nations	Terrace
Kitsumkalum First Nation		Kitselas	Tsimshian	Tsimshianic languages	Tsimshian First Nations	Terrace
Klahoose First Nation	Klahoose Indian Band					Clo-oose
Kʼómoks First Nation	Comox First Nation	K'ómoks	Coast Salish	Comox language	Kwakiutl District Council	Campbell River
Kwadacha Band	Kwadacha First Nation					
Kwakiutl First Nation	Kwagyulh, Kwagyuilh, Port Hardy Band	Kwaguʼł	Kwakwaka'wakw	Kwak'wala	Unaffiliated	Port Hardy
Kwantlen First Nation			Fraser River Salish	Halqemeylem		Fort Langley
Kwaw-kwaw-a-pilt First Nation		Stó꞉lō	Coast Salish	Halqemeylem	Sto:lo Nation	
Kwiakah First Nation		Laich-kwil-tach	Kwakwaka'wakw	Kwak'wala	Kwakiutl District Council	
Ḵwiḵwa̱sut'inux̱w Ha̱xwa'mis First Nation	Kwicksutaineuk-ah-kwa-mish First Nation	Kwicksutaineuk, Haxwa'mis	Kwakwaka'wakw	Kwak'wala	Musgamagw Dzawada'enuxw Tribal Council	
Kwikwetlem First Nation	Coquitlam Indian Band	Kwikwetlem		Halqemeylem		
Ka:'yu:'k't'h'/Che:k:tles7et'h' First Nation	Kyuquot/Cheklesahht First Nation	Kyuquot, Cheklesahht	Nuu-chah-nulth	Nuu-chah-nulth language	Nuu-chah-nulth Tribal Council, Maa-nulth First Nations	Kyuquot Sound
Lake Babine Nation		Wet'suwet'en	Dakelh	Babine-Witsuwitʼen		
Lax-kw'alaams First Nation	Port Simpson		Tsimshian	Coast Tsimshian dialect		Lax Kwʼalaams
Leq'á:mel First Nation	Lakahahmen, Sumas		Sto:lo	Halqemeylem	Sto:lo Nation	Nicomen Island, Deroche
Lheidli-T'enneh Band			Dakelh	Carrier language		Prince George
Lhtako Dene Nation	Red Bluff First Nation		Dakelh	Carrier language	Carrier-Chilcotin Tribal Council	Quesnel
Liard First Nation						Liard River
Lil'wat First Nation	Lil'wat Nation, Mount Currie Indian Band		Lower St'at'imc	St'at'imcets	Lillooet Tribal Council	Mount Currie
Lower Kootenay First Nation					Ktunaxa Nation	
Lower Nicola First Nation						
Lower Post First Nation						Lower Post
Lower Similkameen Indian Band			Syilx	Syilx'tsn		Keremeos
Lyackson First Nation						
Lytton First Nation	Lytton Band	Camchin'mux	Nlaka'pamux	Nlaka'pamuxtsin	Unaffiliated	Lytton
Malahat First Nation	MÁLEXEȽ	W̱SÁNEĆ	Coast Salish	Saanich	Naut'sa mawt Tribal Council	
Mamalilikulla-Qwe'Qwa'Sot'Em Band	Mamalilikulla-Qwe'Qwa'Sot'Em First Nation	Mamalilikulla, Qwe'Qwa'Sot'Em	Kwakwaka'wakw	Kwak'wala	Kwakiutl District Council	
Matsqui First Nation		Stó꞉lō	Coast Salish	Halqemeylem	Sto:lo Nation	Matsqui
McLeod Lake Indian Band						
Metlakatla First Nation			Tsimshian	Sm'algya̱x		
Mowachaht/Muchalaht First Nations		Mowachaht, Muchalaht	Nuu-chah-nulth	Nuu-chah-nulth language	Nuu-chah-nulth Tribal Council	Gold River-Tahsis
Musqueam First Nation	Musqueam Nation	Xwméthkwyiem	Coast Salish	Halkomelem		Vancouver
'Namgis First Nation	Nimpkish Indian Band	'Namgis	Kwakwaka'wakw	Kwak'wala	Kwakiutl District Council	
Nadleh Whut'en First Nation						
Nak'azdli Band						
Nanoose First Nation						
Nazko First Nation						
Nee-Tahi-Buhn Band						
Nicomen Indian Band	Nicomen First Nation		Nlaka'pamux	Nlaka'pamuxtsin	Fraser Canyon Indian Administration, Nicola Tribal Association	near Lytton
N'quatqua Band	N'quatqua First Nation, Nequatque, N'quat'qua		St'at'imc	St'at'imcets		D'Arcy
Nooaitch Indian Band	Nooaitch First Nation		Nlaka'pamux	Nlaka'pamuxtsin	Nicola Tribal Association	
Nuchatlaht First Nations		Nuchatlaht	Nuu-chah-nulth	Nuu-chah-nulth language	Nuu-chah-nulth Tribal Council	
Nuxálk Nation	Bella Coola First Nation		Nuxálk	Nuxálk language	Wuikinuxv-Kitasoo-Nuxalk Tribal Council	Bella Coola
Okanagan Indian Band			Syilx	Syilx'tsn		Vernon
Old Massett Village Council			Haida	Haida	Council of the Haida Nation	Old Massett
Oregon Jack Creek Indian Band	Oregon Jack First Nation		Nlaka'pamux	Nlaka'pamuxtsin	Nlaka'pamux Nation Tribal Council	Ashcroft
Osoyoos Indian Band	Osoyoos First Nation		Syilx	Syilx'tsn		Osoyoos
Pacheedaht First Nation		Pacheedaht	Nuu-chah-nulth-aht	Nuu-chah-nulth language	Unaffiliated	
Pauquachin First Nation		W̱SÁNEĆ	Coast Salish	Saanich		Sidney
Penelakut First Nations	Spune’luxutth					
Penticton Indian Band	SnPink’tn		Syilx	Syilx'tsn	Okanagan Nation Alliance	Osoyoos
Peters Band		Stó꞉lō	Coast Salish	Halqemeylem		
Popkum Band		Stó꞉lō	Coast Salish	Halqemeylem	Sto:lo Nation	Popkum
Prophet River Band						
Qualicum First Nation			Coast Salish	Pentlatch	Unaffiliated	Qualicum Beach
New Westminster Indian Band	Qayqayt First Nation		Coast Salish		Unaffiliated	Vancouver
Quatsino First Nation		Quatsino	Kwakwaka'wakw-Comox	G̱uc̓ala (G̱ut̕sala) Kwak'wala	Kwakiutl District Council	Quatsino Sound
Saik'uz First Nation	Stoney Creek		Dakelh	Carrier language	Carrier Sekani Tribal Council	Vanderhoof
Samahquam First Nation			St'at'imc			Lower Lillooet River
Saulteau First Nation			Saulteau			
Sq'éwlets First Nation	Scowlitz First Nation	Stó꞉lō	Coast Salish	Halqemeylem	Sto:lo Nation	Harrison Mills
Seabird Island First Nation		Stó꞉lō	Coast Salish	Halqemeylem	Sto:lo Nation	Agassiz
shíshálh Nation	Sechelt Indian Band		shíshálh	she shashishalhem		ch’atlich (Sechelt), ḵalpilin (Pender Harbour), lekw’emin (Jervis Inlet)
Semiahmoo First Nation	SEMYOME	Semiahmoo people	Coast Salish	Straits Salish	Unaffiliated	White Rock
Seton Lake First Nation	Seton Band	Tslalalh'mc	St'at'imc	St'at'imcets	Lillooet Tribal Council	Shalalth
Shackan First Nation	Shackan Indian Band	Sxe'xn'x	Nlaka'pamux	Nlaka'pamuxtsin		Lower Nicola
Simpcw First Nation	North Thompson Indian Band	Simpcw	Secwepemc	Secwepemctsin	Shuswap Nation Tribal Council	Chu Chua, N of Barriere
Siska Indian Band			Nlaka'pamux	Nlaka'pamuxtsin	Nicola Tribal Association	Siska
Skatin First Nations	Skookumchuck	In-SHUCK-ch	St'at'imc	Lillooet language	In-SHUCK-ch Nation	Skookumchuck Hot Springs
Skawahlook First Nation						
Skeetchestn Indian Band						
Skidegate Band Council			Haida	Haida	Council of the Haida Nation	Skidegate
Skin Tyee		Wet'suwet'en	Dakelh	Babine-Witsuwitʼen		Prince George
Shxwhá:y Village	Skway First Nation	Stó꞉lō	Coast Salish	Halqemeylem	Sto:lo Nation	Rosedale
Skwlax te Secwepemculecw	Little Shuswap Indian Band	Qaoout	Secwepemc	Secwepemc'tsn		Chase
Shxw'ow'hamel First Nation	Skowkamel, Ohamil	Stó꞉lō	Coast Salish	Halqemeylem	Sto:lo Nation	
Skawahlook First Nation		Stó꞉lō	Coast Salish	Halqemeylem	Sto:lo Nation	
Skowkale First Nation		Stó꞉lō	Coast Salish	Halqemeylem	Sto:lo Nation	
Skuppah Indian Band	Skuppah First Nation		Nlaka'pamux	Nlaka'pamuxtsn	Fraser Canyon Indian Administration	
Skwah First Nation	Skwah Indian Band (also "Skway")	Stó꞉lō	Coast Salish	Halqemeylem	Sto:lo Nation	
Songhees First Nation		Lekwungen	Coast Salish	Lekwungen		Victoria
Soowahlie First Nation		Stó꞉lō	Coast Salish	Halqemeylem	Sto:lo Nation	
Spuzzum First Nation	Spuzzum Indian Band		Nlaka'pamux	Nlaka'pamuxtsin	Nlaka'pamux Nation Tribal Council, Fraser Canyon Indian Administration	Spuzzum
Squamish Nation	Sḵwx̱wú7mesh Úxwumixw	Squamish people	Coast Salish	Squamish language		Squamish, North Vancouver
Squiala First Nation		Stó꞉lō	Coast Salish	Halqemeylem	Sto:lo Nation	
Sts'ailes Nation	Chehalis First Nation	Sts'ailes	Coast Salish	Halqemeylem		Chehalis
Stellat'en First Nation						
Stswecem'c Xget'tem First Nation	Canoe Creek Band/Dog Creek Indian Band		Secwépemc	Shuswap	Northern Shuswap Tribal Council	Canoe Creek
Stz'uminus First Nation	Chemainus First Nation		Coast Salish	Halqemeylem	Naut'sa mawt Tribal Council	Ladysmith
Sumas First Nation		Stó꞉lō	Coast Salish	Halqemeylem	Sto:lo Nation	Sumas
Tahltan First Nation	Tahltan Indian Band		Tahltan	Tahltan language		Telegraph Creek
Takla Lake First Nation						
T'it'q'et First Nation	T'it'kt First Nation, Lillooet Indian Band		Lower St'at'imc	St'at'imcets	Lillooet Tribal Council	Lillooet
Taku River Tlingit First Nation			Tlingit	Tlingit language		
Tla'amin Nation	Sliammon First Nation		Mainland Comox	Comox language		
Tl'azt'en Nation						
Tla-o-qui-aht First Nations		Tla-o-qui-aht	Nuu-chah-nulth-aht	Nuu-chah-nulth language	Nuu-chah-nulth Tribal Council	
Tlatlasikwala Nation		Tlatlasikwala	Kwakwaka'wakw	Kwak'wala		Port Hardy
Tlʼesqox First Nation	Toosey First Nation					
Tlowitsis Nation		Tlowitsis	Kwakwaka'wakw	Kwak'wala		
Toquaht First Nation		Toquaht	Nuu-chah-nulth-aht	Nuu-chah-nulth language	Nuu-chah-nulth Tribal Council	
Tsartlip First Nation		W̱SÁNEĆ	Coast Salish	Saanich	Sencot'en Alliance	Brentwood Bay
Tsawwassen First Nation	sc̓əwaθən məsteyəxʷ		Coast Salish	Halkomelem	Naut'sa mawt Tribal Council	Tsawwassen
Tsawout First Nation		W̱SÁNEĆ	Coast Salish	Saanich	Sencot'en Alliance	Saanich
Tsay Keh Dene First Nation	Tsay Keh Dene Band		Dene	Dene language		
Tseshaht First Nation		Tseshaht	Nuu-chah-nulth-aht	Nuu-chah-nulth language	Nuu-chah-nulth Tribal Council	Port Alberni
Tseycum First Nation	W̱SÍḴEM	W̱SÁNEĆ	Coast Salish	Saanich		
Ts'il Kaz Koh First Nation	Burns Lake First Nation	Wetʼsuwetʼen	Dakelh	Babine-Witsuwitʼen	Carrier Sekani Tribal Council	Burns Lake
Tŝideldel First Nation	Tsi Del Del Alexis Creek	Nenqayni Deni	Tsilhqot'in	Chilcotin language	Tsilhqotʼin National Government	Alexis Creek
Tsleil-Waututh First Nation	Burrard Band		Coast Salish	Skwxwu7mesh snichim		North Vancouver
Tsq'escen' First Nation	Canim Lake Band		Secwépemc	Shuswap	Northern Shuswap Tribal Council	Canim Lake
Ts'kw'aylaxw First Nation	Pavilion Indian Band		St'at'imc-Secwepemc	Secwepemctsn-St'at'imcets	Lillooet Tribal Council	Pavilion
Tsʼuubaa-asatx Nation	Lake Cowichan First Nation	Ts'uubaa-asatx	Coast Salish	Halkomelem		Lake Cowichan
Uchucklesaht First Nation		Uchucklesaht	Nuu-chah-nulth-aht	Nuu-chah-nulth language	Nuu-chah-nulth Tribal Council	
Ulkatcho First Nation						
Union Bar First Nation	Union Bar Indian Band		Fraser River Salish	Halqemeylem		Hope
Upper Nicola Band	Upper Nicola Indian Band	Spaxomin	Syilx, Scw'exmx	Syilx'tsn, Nlaka'pamuxtsin	Okanagan Nation Alliance, Nicola Tribal Association	Osoyoos
Upper Similkameen Indian Band			Syilx	Syilx'tsn		Keremeos
We Wai Kai First Nation	Cape Mudge First Nation	Laich-kwil-tach	Kwakwaka'wakw	Kwak'wala	Kwakiutl District Council	Quadra Island
West Moberly First Nations			Dane-zaa, Cree	Dane-zaa, Cree	Treaty 8 Tribal Association	Moberly Lake
Westbank First Nation			Syilx	Syilx'tsn	Okanagan Nation Alliance	Kelowna
Wetʼsuwetʼen First Nation	Broman Lake Indian Band	Wet'suwet'en	Dakelh	Babine-Witsuwitʼen	Carrier Sekani Tribal Council	
Williams Lake First Nation	T’exelcemc	T’exelcemc	Secwépemc	Shuswap	Northern Shuswap Tribal Council	Williams Lake
Witset First Nation		Wet'suwet'en	Dakelh	Babine-Witsuwitʼen		Witset
Wuikinuxv First Nation	Owekeeno First Nation, Rivers Inlet Band		Wuikinuxv	Oowekyala	Wuikinuxv-Kitasoo-Nuxalk Tribal Council	Rivers Inlet
Xat'sull First Nation	Soda Creek/Deep Creek Band					
Xaxli'p First Nation	Fountain Indian Band		St'at'imc	St'at'imcets	Lillooet Tribal Council	Fountain
Yakweakwioose First Nation	Yeqwyeqwí:ws	Stó꞉lō	Coast Salish	Halqemeylem	Sto:lo Nation	
Yale First Nation	Yale Band	Stó꞉lō	Coast Salish	Halqemeylem		Yale
Yaq̓it ʔa·knuqⱡi’it First Nation	Tobacco Plains Indian Band					
Yekooche First Nation	Stuart-Trembleur Band		Dakelh	Carrier language	Carrier Sekani Tribal Council	Stuart Lake
Yunesitʼin Government	Stone First Nation		Yunesit'in	Tsilhqot'in	Chilcotin language	Stone
Yuułuʔiłʔatḥ Government	Ucluelet First Nation	Yuułuʔiłʔatḥ	Nuu-chah-nulth-aht	Nuu-chah-nulth language	Maa-nulth Treaty Society, Nuu-chah-nulth Tribal Council	Hitacu, Ucluelet
ʔaq̓am	St. Mary's First Nation		Kutenai	Kutenai language	Ktunaxa Nation	Cranbrook
Ɂakisq̓nuk First Nation	Columbia Lake First Nation					
ʔEsdilagh First Nation	Alexandria		Tsilhqotʼin	Tsilhqotʼin	Tsilhqotʼin National Government	Quesnel

== See also ==
- List of tribal councils in British Columbia
- Status of British Columbian First Nation Treaties
