= First Nations in British Columbia =

Indigenous peoples in Canadian province

First Nations in British Columbia constitute the many First Nations governments and peoples in the Canadian province of British Columbia. They are represented by 202 band governments and 23 tribal councils.

Ethnic groups include the Haida, Coast Salish, Kwakwaka'wakw, Gitxsan, Tsimshian, Nisga'a and other examples of the Pacific Northwest Coast cultures, and also various Interior Salish and Athapaskan peoples, and also the Ktunaxa.

== List of band governments ==
Recognized First Nation band governments in British Columbia
Language Family	People	Band government	Area (ha)	Population (2025)
Athabaskan	Babine	Lake Babine	3,093.90	2,559
Athabaskan	Dakelh	Binche Whut'en	653.9	237
Athabaskan	Dakelh	Cheslatta Carrier	1,402.8	390
Athabaskan	Dakelh	Lheidli T'enneh	675.50	896
Athabaskan	Dakelh	Lhoosk'uz Dene	1,647.50	234
Athabaskan	Dakelh	Lhtako Dene	682.70	216
Athabaskan	Dakelh	Nadleh Whut'en	969	622
Athabaskan	Dakelh	Nak'azdli Whut'en	1,456	2,090
Athabaskan	Dakelh	Nazko	1,973.10	435
Athabaskan	Dakelh	Saik'uz	3,235.70	996
Athabaskan	Dakelh	Stellat'en	851	636
Athabaskan	Dakelh	Takla	809	948
Athabaskan	Dakelh	Tl'azt'en	2,786.10	1,559
Athabaskan	Dakelh	Ulkatcho	3,245.70	1,087
Athabaskan	Dakelh	Yekooche	3,225.50	220
Athabaskan	Dane-zaa	Blueberry River	1,505.8	546
Athabaskan	Dane-zaa	Doig River	1,358.1	324
Athabaskan	Dane-zaa	Halfway River	3,988.8	299
Athabaskan	Dane-zaa	Prophet River	373.90	300
Athabaskan	Dane-zaa	Saulteau (Note: Also include Cree, Nakoda, Saulteaux and Iroquois members)	3,025.80	1,434
Athabaskan	Dane-zaa	West Moberly	2,033.60	373
Athabaskan	Dene	Fort Nelson	9,752.6	1,015
Athabaskan	Tahltan	Iskut	161.60	830
Athabaskan	Tahltan	Tahltan First Nation	1,377.10	2,174
Athabaskan	Tse'khene	Kwadacha	385.40	610
Athabaskan	Tse'khene	McLeod Lake	18,285.70	584
Athabaskan	Tse'khene	Tsay Keh Dene	201	518
Athabaskan	Tsilhqotʼin	ʔEsdilagh	1,348.20	282
Athabaskan	Tsilhqotʼin	Tlʼesqox	2,582.50	487
Athabaskan	Tsilhqotʼin	Tlʼetinqox-tʼin	5,655.9	1,750
Athabaskan	Tsilhqotʼin	Tŝideldel	4,362.5	694
Athabaskan	Tsilhqotʼin	Xeni Gwetʼin	1,260.50	476
Athabaskan	Tsilhqotʼin	Yunesitʼin	2,146.40	509
Athabaskan	Wetʼsuwetʼen	Hagwilget	158.6	838
Athabaskan	Wetʼsuwetʼen	Nee-Tahi-Buhn	719.20	146
Athabaskan	Wetʼsuwetʼen	Skin Tyee	396.60	193
Athabaskan	Wetʼsuwetʼen	Ts'il Kaz Koh	185	207
Athabaskan	Wetʼsuwetʼen	Wetʼsuwetʼen	650	250
Athabaskan	Wetʼsuwetʼen	Witset	1,427	2,139
Coast Salish	Hulʻqʻumiʻnumʻ	Beecher Bay	307.70	277
Coast Salish	Hulʻqʻumiʻnumʻ	Cowichan Tribes	2,426	5,614
Coast Salish	Hulʻqʻumiʻnumʻ	Halalt	165.80	213
Coast Salish	Hulʻqʻumiʻnumʻ	Lyackson	744.60	233
Coast Salish	Hulʻqʻumiʻnumʻ	Penelakut	635.70	1,247
Coast Salish	Hulʻqʻumiʻnumʻ	Snaw-naw-as	62.80	277
Coast Salish	Hulʻqʻumiʻnumʻ	Snuneymuxw	266	1,999
Coast Salish	Hulʻqʻumiʻnumʻ	Stz'uminus	1,270.90	1,466
Coast Salish	Hunʼqumiʼnum	Musqueam	273	1,500
Coast Salish	Hunʼqumiʼnum	Tsawwassen	272.60	416
Coast Salish	Hunʼqumiʼnum	Tsleil-Waututh	110.70	715
Coast Salish	Kʼómoks	Homalco	745.10	494
Coast Salish	Kʼómoks	K'ómoks	280.70	353
Coast Salish	Kʼómoks	Klahoose	1,357.60	454
Coast Salish	Kʼómoks	Tla'amin	1,907.20	1,248
Coast Salish	Lekwungen	Esquimalt	18.90	379
Coast Salish	Lekwungen	Songhees	138.10	692
Coast Salish	Pentlatch	Qualicum	77	158
Coast Salish	Semiahmoo	Semiahmoo	129.10	104
Coast Salish	Squamish	Squamish	2,120	4,667
Coast Salish	Stó꞉lō	Aitchelitz	564.90	41
Coast Salish	Stó꞉lō	Chawathil	625.20	672
Coast Salish	Stó꞉lō	Cheam	473.20	586
Coast Salish	Stó꞉lō	Katzie	335.20	661
Coast Salish	Stó꞉lō	Kwantlen	568.90	414
Coast Salish	Stó꞉lō	Kwaw-kwaw-Apilt	606.20	60
Coast Salish	Stó꞉lō	Kwikwetlem	84.50	148
Coast Salish	Stó꞉lō	Leq'á:mel	491.20	559
Coast Salish	Stó꞉lō	Matsqui	430.80	282
Coast Salish	Stó꞉lō	Peters	197	192
Coast Salish	Stó꞉lō	Popkum	160	13
Coast Salish	Stó꞉lō	Seabird Island	2,190.10	1,098
Coast Salish	Stó꞉lō	Shxwhá:y	798.50	509
Coast Salish	Stó꞉lō	Skawahlook	85.20	93
Coast Salish	Stó꞉lō	Skowkale	144.10	305
Coast Salish	Stó꞉lō	Skwah	885.20	735
Coast Salish	Stó꞉lō	Soowahlie	533.40	467
Coast Salish	Stó꞉lō	Sq'éwlets	247	302
Coast Salish	Stó꞉lō	Squiala	676.60	223
Coast Salish	Stó꞉lō	Sts'ailes	916	1,181
Coast Salish	Stó꞉lō	Sumas	245.30	384
Coast Salish	Stó꞉lō	Tzeachten	358.90	621
Coast Salish	Stó꞉lō	Union Bar	499.70	177
Coast Salish	Stó꞉lō	Yakweakwioose	94.50	96
Coast Salish	Stó꞉lō	Yale	224.10	210
Coast Salish	shíshálh	shíshálh	1,031.70	1,692
Coast Salish	T'Sou-ke	T'Sou-ke	67.20	355
Coast Salish	W̱SÁNEĆ	Malahat	247.90	370
Coast Salish	W̱SÁNEĆ	Pauquachin	330.40	423
Coast Salish	W̱SÁNEĆ	Tsartlip	333.80	1,071
Coast Salish	W̱SÁNEĆ	Tsawout	423.40	1,019
Coast Salish	W̱SÁNEĆ	Tseycum	196.30	211
Interior Salish	Nlaka'pamux	Ashcroft	1,986.10	440
Interior Salish	Nlaka'pamux	Boothroyd	1,131.4	342
Interior Salish	Nlaka'pamux	Boston Bar	556.1	326
Interior Salish	Nlaka'pamux	Coldwater	2,500.6	959
Interior Salish	Nlaka'pamux	Cook's Ferry	3,983.5	389
Interior Salish	Nlaka'pamux	Kanaka Bar	273.9	247
Interior Salish	Nlaka'pamux	Lower Nicola	7,128.20	1,572
Interior Salish	Nlaka'pamux	Lytton	6,005.70	2,152
Interior Salish	Nlaka'pamux	Nicomen	1,175.70	226
Interior Salish	Nlaka'pamux	Nooaitch	1,693.40	247
Interior Salish	Nlaka'pamux	Oregon Jack Creek	822.80	74
Interior Salish	Nlaka'pamux	Shackan	3,873.70	129
Interior Salish	Nlaka'pamux	Siska	357.50	342
Interior Salish	Nlaka'pamux	Skuppah	245.90	151
Interior Salish	Nlaka'pamux	Spuzzum	648	501
Interior Salish	Secwépemc	Adams Lake	2,908.80	865
Interior Salish	Secwépemc	Bonaparte	1,878.60	1,156
Interior Salish	Secwépemc	Esk'etemc	3,960.10	1,206
Interior Salish	Secwépemc	High Bar	1,546.30	310
Interior Salish	Secwépemc	Neskonlith	2,811.20	695
Interior Salish	Secwépemc	Shuswap	1,866.50	312
Interior Salish	Secwépemc	Simpcw	1,500.70	894
Interior Salish	Secwépemc	Skeetchestn	8,042.50	585
Interior Salish	Secwépemc	Skwlax te Secwepemculecw	3,112.70	389
Interior Salish	Secwépemc	Splatsin	3,905.20	961
Interior Salish	Secwépemc	Stswecem'c Xget'tem	5,582.80	852
Interior Salish	Secwépemc	Tk'emlúps te Secwépemc	13,415.60	1,556
Interior Salish	Secwépemc	Tsq'escen'	2,064.90	595
Interior Salish	Secwépemc	Whispering Pines/Clinton	565.20	237
Interior Salish	Secwépemc	Williams Lake	1,983.40	1,064
Interior Salish	Secwépemc	Xat'sull	2,092.70	468
Interior Salish	Stʼatʼimc	Bridge River	4,699.40	501
Interior Salish	Stʼatʼimc	Cayoose Creek	720.10	213
Interior Salish	Stʼatʼimc	Douglas	432.40	391
Interior Salish	Stʼatʼimc	Lil'wat	2,694.30	2,294
Interior Salish	Stʼatʼimc	N'Quatqua	804.30	387
Interior Salish	Stʼatʼimc	Samahquam	177.30	385
Interior Salish	Stʼatʼimc	Shxw'ow'hamel	372.10	250
Interior Salish	Stʼatʼimc	Skatin	676.60	423
Interior Salish	Stʼatʼimc	T'it'q'et	1,497.80	510
Interior Salish	Stʼatʼimc	Ts'kw'aylaxw	2,130	598
Interior Salish	Stʼatʼimc	Tsal'alh	1,891.70	736
Interior Salish	Stʼatʼimc	Xaxli'p	1,581.60	1,138
Interior Salish	Sylix	Lower Similkameen	15,048.80	724
Interior Salish	Sylix	Okanagan	10,636.80	2,462
Interior Salish	Sylix	Osoyoos	13,009.10	602
Interior Salish	Sylix	Westbank	2,161.30	978
Interior Salish	Sylix	Penticton	18,700.90	1,216
Interior Salish	Sylix	Upper Nicola	12,551.20	1,005
Interior Salish	Sylix	Upper Similkameen	2,725.90	340
Haida		Old Massett	970	3,326
Haida		Skidegate	840	1,766
Kutenai		ʔaq̓am	8,717.90	407
Kutenai		Lower Kootenay	3,246.30	255
Kutenai		Yaq̓it ʔa·knuqⱡi ‘it	5,070	285
Nuxalk		Nuxalk	2,025.90	1,838
Timshianic	Gitxsan	Gitanmaax	2,377.8	2,641
Timshianic	Gitxsan	Gitanyow	850.4	864
Timshianic	Gitxsan	Gitsegukla	1,930.5	1,111
Timshianic	Gitxsan	Glen Vowell	632.7	426
Timshianic	Gitxsan	Gitwangak	1,571.9	1,551
Timshianic	Gitxsan	Kispiox	1,675.2	1,707
Timshianic	Nisga'a	Ging̱olx	2,891	2,046
Timshianic	Nisga'a	Gitlaxt'aamix	2,062	1,865
Timshianic	Nisga'a	Gitwinksihlkw	644.80	383
Timshianic	Nisga'a	Lax̱g̱altsʼap	2,609.90	1,876
Timshianic	Tsimshian	Gitga'at	641.70	873
Timshianic	Tsimshian	Gitxaala	1,885.70	2,110
Timshianic	Tsimshian	Kitasoo/Xai'xais (Note: Combination of 2 groups: Tsimshian (Kitasoo) and Xai'xais, a Waskashan language speaking group)	718.40	905
Timshianic	Tsimshian	Kitselas	1,069.10	783
Timshianic	Tsimshian	Kitsumkalum	597	905
Timshianic	Tsimshian	Lax Kw'alaams	16,496.20	4,237
Timshianic	Tsimshian	Metlakatla	7,740.70	1,114
Wakashan	Ditidaht	Ditidaht	750.7	770
Wakashan	Ditidaht	Ts'uubaa-asatx	2,424.60	36
Wakashan	Haisla	Haisla	726.10	2,118
Wakashan	Heiltsuk	Heiltsuk	1,420.40	2,535
Wakashan	Kwakwakaʼwakw	Da'naxda'xw	39.30	268
Wakashan	Kwakwakaʼwakw	Dzawada'enuxw	218	555
Wakashan	Kwakwakaʼwakw	Gwa'Sala-Nakwaxda'xw	794.10	1,122
Wakashan	Kwakwakaʼwakw	Gwawaenuk	206.30	42
Wakashan	Kwakwakaʼwakw	Kwakiutl	502.10	1,023
Wakashan	Kwakwakaʼwakw	Kwiakah	68.80	21
Wakashan	Kwakwakaʼwakw	Kwikwasut'inuxw Haxwa'mis	179.10	309
Wakashan	Kwakwakaʼwakw	Mamalilikulla-QweʼQwaʼSotʼEm	232.40	481
Wakashan	Kwakwakaʼwakw	Namgis	442	2,008
Wakashan	Kwakwakaʼwakw	Quatsino	402.70	609
Wakashan	Kwakwakaʼwakw	Tlatlasikwala	3,474.40	68
Wakashan	Kwakwakaʼwakw	Tlowitsis	176.40	455
Wakashan	Kwakwakaʼwakw	We Wai Kai	663.10	1,305
Wakashan	Kwakwakaʼwakw	Wei Wai Kum	203.30	961
Wakashan	Nuu-chah-nulth	Ahousaht	565.5	2,233
Wakashan	Nuu-chah-nulth	Ehattesaht	139.3	568
Wakashan	Nuu-chah-nulth	Hesquiaht	320.5	753
Wakashan	Nuu-chah-nulth	Hupacasath	219.10	377
Wakashan	Nuu-chah-nulth	Huu-ay-aht	7,181 (Note: New treaty settlement lands. Previous reserve lands were 1077 ha)	733
Wakashan	Nuu-chah-nulth	Ka:'yu:'k't'h'/Che:k:tles7et'h'	376.90	581
Wakashan	Nuu-chah-nulth	Mowachaht/Muchalaht	388.30	610
Wakashan	Nuu-chah-nulth	Nuchatlaht	92.20	167
Wakashan	Nuu-chah-nulth	Pacheedaht	117.70	301
Wakashan	Nuu-chah-nulth	Tla-o-qui-aht	347.80	1,242
Wakashan	Nuu-chah-nulth	Toquaht	194.70	158
Wakashan	Nuu-chah-nulth	Tseshaht	593.60	1,270
Wakashan	Nuu-chah-nulth	Uchucklesaht	232.70	259
Wakashan	Nuu-chah-nulth	Ucluelet	199.30	681
Wakashan	Wuikinuxv	Wuikinuxv	712.80	292

== Knowledge of Nations ==
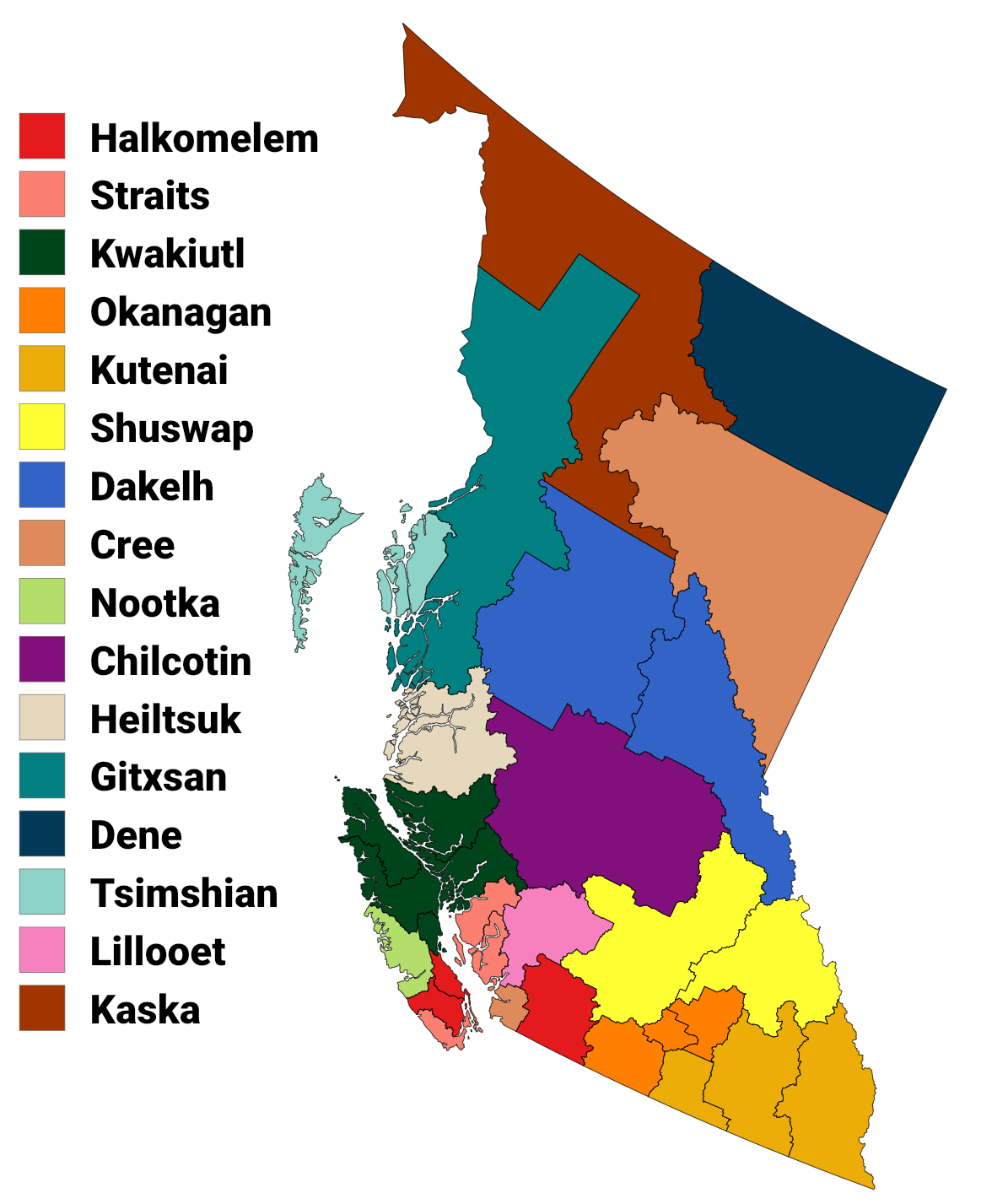
Largest First Nations knowledge of language in British Columbia, 2021 census

== Education jurisdiction ==
First Nations in British Columbia have a unique legal framework unavailable to First Nations in other provinces allowing them jurisdiction to manage schools independent of provincial jurisdiction.

== See also ==
- List of tribal councils in British Columbia
- List of Indian reserves in British Columbia
