= List of tribal councils in British Columbia =

The following is a list of tribal councils in British Columbia. Treaty Council organizations are not listed.

== List of tribal councils ==
Tribal councils in BC, as of 2019
| Tribal council | Location/headquarters | Member Nations |
|---|---|---|
| Carrier-Chilcotin Tribal Council | Williams Lake | Lhoosk'uz Dene, Lhtako Dene, Tlʼesqox, and Ulkatcho |
| Carrier Sekani Tribal Council | Prince George, British Columbia | Nadleh Whut'en, Saik'uz, Stellat'en, Takla, Tl'azt'en, Tsʼil Kaz Koh, and Wet'suwet'en |
| First Nation of the Maa-Nulth Treaty Society | Port Alberni | |
| Nlaka'pamux Nation Tribal Council | Lytton | Boothroyd, Boston Bar, Lytton, Oregon Jack Creek, Skuppah, and Spuzzum |
| Gitksan Local Services Society | Hazelton | Gitanmaax, Gitanyow, Glen Vowell, and Kispiox |
| Ktunaxa Nation Council Society | Cranbrook | Ɂakisq̓nuk, ʔaq̓am, and Tobacco Plains |
| Kwakiutl District Council | Campbell River | Campbell River (Wei Wai Kum), Da'naxda'xw, Kwakiutl, Kwiakah, Mamalilikulla, Tlatlasikwala, and We Wai Kai |
| Lillooet Tribal Council (aka St'at'imc Nation) | Lillooet | Bridge River, Cayoose Creek, Ts'kw'aylaxw, Tsal'alh, and Xaxli'p |
| Lower Stl'atl'imx Tribal Council | Pemberton | Douglas, Lil'wat, N'Quatqua, Samahquam, and Skatin |
| Musgamagw Dzawada'enuxw Tribal Council | Campbell River | Dzawada'enuxw, Gwawaenuk Tribe, and Kwikwasut'inuxw Haxwa'mis |
| Naut'sa mawt Tribal Council | Delta | Halalt, Homalco, K'ómoks, Klahoose, Malahat, Snaw-naw-as, Stz'uminus, T'Sou-ke, Tla'amin, Tsawwassen, and Tsleil-Waututh |
| Northern Shuswap Tribal Council Society (aka. Cariboo Tribal Council) | Williams Lake | Canim Lake, Stswecem'c Xgat'tem, Williams Lake, and Xat'sull |
| Nuu-chah-nulth Tribal Council | Port Alberni | Ahousaht, Ditidaht, Ehattesaht, Hesquiaht, Hupacasath, Huu-ay-aht, Ka:'yu:'k't'h'/Che:k:tles7et'h', Mowachaht/Muchalaht, Nuchatlaht, Tla-o-qui-aht, Toquaht, Tseshaht, Uchucklesaht, and Yuułuʔiłʔatḥ |
| Okanagan Nation Alliance | Westbank | Lower Similkameen, Osoyoos, Penticton, and Westbank (also includes Colville Reservation in Washington) |
| Scw’exmx Tribal Council | Merritt | Coldwater, Nooaitch, Shackan, and Upper Nicola |
| Secretariat of the Haida Nation | Masset, Haida Gwaii | Old Massett Village Council and Skidegate |
| Shuswap Nation Tribal Council | Kamloops | Adams Lake, Bonaparte, Neskonlith, Shuswap, Simpcw, Skeetchestn, Splats'in, Tk’emlúps te Secwépemc, and Whispering Pines/Clinton |
| Sto:lo Nation | Chilliwack | Aitchelitz, Ch'iyáqtel, Leq'á:mel, Matsqui, Shxwhá:y Village, Skawahlook, Skowkale, Squiala, Sumas, and Yakweakwioose |
| Stó:lō Tribal Council | Agassiz | Chawathil, Cheam, Kwantlen, Kwaw-kwaw-Apilt, Seabird Island, Shxw'ow'hamel, Soowahlie, and Sq'éwlets |
| Treaty 8 Tribal Association | Fort St. John | Doig River, Fort Nelson, Halfway River, Prophet River, Saulteau First Nations, and West Moberly |
| Tsilhqot'in National Government (aka Tsilhqot'in Tribal Council) | Williams Lake | ʔEsdilagh, Tl'etinqox Government, Tŝideldel First Nation, Xeni Gwet'in, and Yunesit'in Government |
| Wuikinuxv-Kitasoo-Nuxalk Tribal Council | Bella Coola | Kitasoo/Xaixais, Nuxalk, and Wuikinuxv |

Defunct:

- Fraser Canyon Indian Administration (Nlaka'pamux)
- In-SHUCK-ch Nation
- Tsimshian Tribal Council

== Other organizations ==
The following are groups that are not technically tribal councils but are organizations of traditional governments, or representing traditional governance.

- Office of the Hereditary Chiefs of the Gitxsan
- Office of the Hereditary Chiefs of the Wet'suwet'en, referred to by the BC government as "Office of the Wet'suwet'en"
- Tahltan Nation, governed by Tahltan Central Council

The first two organizations are allied and often release joint documents with the name Office of the Hereditary Chiefs of the Gitxsan and Wet'suwet'en.

== See also ==
- First Nations in British Columbia
- Status of First Nations treaties in British Columbia
