= Scwʼexmx =

The Scwʼexmx (/ʃəˈkwɑːkəm/ Scw̓éxmx), meaning "people of the creek(s)", are a branch of the Nlaka'pamux (Thompson) people in the Nicola Country of the Canadian province of British Columbia (Scw'ex, meaning "creek", is the name of the Nicola River in the Thompson language). Together with the neighbouring branch of the Okanagan people the Spaxomin (usually Spahomin in English), who live in the upper, eastern reaches of the Nicola Valley, they are generally known in English as the Nicolas. They also share governmental institutions, and their alliance dates to before the time of Chief Nicola, for whom the river was named and whose father had led the Okanagan migration into the valley in the late 18th century. The Scw'exmx intermarried with the Okanagans, and also with the Nicola Athapaskans (Stu'wix), a now-extinct Athapaskan-speaking people who migrated into the valley in the 17th century.

== Language ==
The Scw'exmx speak the Scw'exmx dialect of Nle'kepmxcin, known in English as the Thompson language. The language is now nearly extinct but as with other indigenous languages in British Columbia efforts to educate new generations in the language show hope for survival.

== Communities ==
The main Scw'exmx communities are:

- Shackan (Shackan First Nation)
- Shulus (Lower Nicola First Nation)
- Nooaitch (Nooaitch First Nation)
- Ntsla'tko (Coldwater First Nation)

== Government ==
Their tribal government is the Nicola Tribal Association. Other than the four governments already listed the Nicola Tribal Association includes:

- Upper Nicola First Nation – aka the Spaxomin (Douglas Lake), who are also a member of the Okanagan Nation Alliance.
- Cook's Ferry First Nation near Spences Bridge
- Nicomen First Nation near Lytton
- Siska First Nation, in the Fraser Canyon south of Lytton

Other Nlaka'pamux bands outside the Nicola region belong to two other tribal councils:

- Nlaka'pamux Nation Tribal Council
- Fraser Canyon Indian Administration

== See also ==
- Nlaka'pamux
- Thompson language
