= Uu-a-thluk =

British Columbian aquatic management organization

Uu-a-thluk is the aquatic management organization of the Nuu-chah-nulth people on Vancouver Island, British Columbia.

The organization was established with financial support from the federal government in recognition of the need to manage aquatic resources wisely together with the many sectors and interests working in the area. The philosophy that drives the organization is the idea that working cooperatively with other governments, communities and individuals is required to achieve sustainable and fruitful management.

The term uu-a-thluk itself means 'taking care of' in the Nuu-chah-nulth language spoken on the west coast of Vancouver Island.

== Structure ==
Uu-a-thluk’ members are from the 14 member Nations of the Nuu-chah-nulth Tribal Council as well as the Pacheedaht Nation in the southern part of the Nuu-chah-nulth territory. More specifically, its members include the following First Nations:

- Ka:’yu:’k’t’h’/Che:k’tles7et’h’
- Nuchatlaht
- Ehattesaht
- Mowachaht/Muchahtlaht
- Hesquiaht
- Ahousaht
- Tla-o-qui-aht
- Ucluelet
- Toquaht
- Uchucklesaht
- Tseshaht
- Hupacasath
- Huu-ay-aht
- Ditidaht
- Pacheedaht

== Administration and responsibilities ==
Uu-a-thluk publishes a quarterly newsletter that has information about projects, people and opportunities related to aquatic resource use in the region.

The Uu-a-thluk administration includes a Joint Technical Working Group and a Secretariat: The Joint Technical Working Group was set up to allow a forum for First Nations and government, represented by the Department of Fisheries and Oceans (DFO), to work together to solve problems and allow communities to take advantage of conservation and economic opportunities. The Secretariat, which performs core administrative functions, includes biologists, managers, outreach, capacity development, fundraising and economic development. This body conducts the work of the organization under the direction of the council of Ha’wiih.
