= Kanaka Bar First Nation =

Kanaka Bar First Nation (Thompson language: T'eqt'aqtn'mux) is a First Nations government located at Kanaka Bar, British Columbia, Canada, between the towns of Boston Bar and Lytton in the Fraser Canyon region. It is a member of the Fraser Canyon Indian Administration, one of three tribal councils of the Nlaka'pamux people. Other members of the Fraser Canyon Indian Administration are the Spuzzum, Skuppah and Nicomen First Nations (the Nicomen First Nation is also a member of the Nicola Tribal Association). Other Nlaka'pamux governments belong either to the Nicola Tribal Association or the Nlaka'pamux Nation Tribal Council.

"Kanaka" was a word used throughout the Pacific islands and Australian to indicate a person recruited for manual labour. Kanaka also means "free man" but in many cases it meant indentured servant. Many Hawaiians were employed in the Fraser Canyon. The presence of many Hawaiians, known in their own language also as kanaka (local guy) on the gold workings on the Fraser in this area conferred the name Kanaka Bar on a certain gold-rich sandbar on the Fraser below.

== Reserves ==
The Kanaka Bar First Nation governs these reserves:

- Nekliptum Indian Reserve No. 1
- Kanaka Bar Indian Reserve No. 1A
- Kanaka Bar Indian Reserve No. 2
- Pegleg Indian Reserve No. 3
- Pegleg Indian Reserve No. 3A
- Whyeek Indian Reserve No. 4

Source: Indian and Northern Affairs Canada First Nations profiles

== Economic Development ==
Hydroelectric Projects

Kwoiek Creek Hydroelectric Project: The Kwoiek Creek Hydroelectric Project is a 49.9 MW, run-of-river project located on the lower reaches of Kwoiek Creek, a tributary to the Fraser River, approximately 14 km (9 mi) south of Lytton, British Columbia. The Project will include a water diversion and intake facilities, a buried penstock and a powerhouse located on Kanaka Bar Indian Band's Whyeek IR No. 4 near Lytton. The Project will also include an approximately 80 km (50 mi) long, 138-kV transmission line to transmit electricity generated by the Project to the BC Hydro substation at Highland Valley.

The developer of the project is Kwoiek Creek Resources Limited Partnership (KCRLP), a partnership between the Kanaka Bar Indian Band ("KBIB") and Innergex Renewable Energy Inc. (Innergex).

KCRLP obtained an Energy Purchase Agreement (EPA) from B.C. Hydro in August 2006. In March 2009, the Project received an Environmental Assessment (EA) Certificate following the completion of a provincial and federal review led by the BC Environmental Assessment Office (BCEAO). The Canadian Environmental Assessment Agency (CEAA) Screening Report was issued in September 2009 and a favourable CEAA decision was made on October 5, 2009. The water licence and crown land tenures were issued in September 2011 and August 2011, respectively. Construction of the access for the Project commenced in June 2011.

== See also ==
- Kanakas
- Nlaka'pamux
- Thompson language
- Nlaka'pamux Nation Tribal Council
- Nicola Tribal Association
- Fraser Canyon Indian Administration (tribal council)
