= Sxeʼxnʼx =

The Sxeʼxnʼx (Thompson: Sx̣íx̣nx) are a First Nations people of the Lower Nicola Valley in the southern Southern Interior of the Canadian province of British Columbia. They are part of the larger Nlaka'pamux (Thompson) people and closely connected to the Scw'exmx, a major subgroup of the Nlakapamuxtsin-speaking peoples. Their primary community is Shackan or Lower Nicola, just west of Merritt ("Shackan" comes from Scw'ex, the name of the Nicolas River).

== Government ==
The band government is the Shackan Indian Band, which is a member of the Nicola Tribal Association.

== See also ==
- Nlaka'pamux
- Scw'exmxx
- Shackan Indian Band
- Nicola Tribal Association
