= Spuzzum First Nation =

Spuzzum First Nation (Thompson: Spôʼzêm) is a Nlakaʼpamux First Nations government located near Spuzzum, British Columbia. It is a member of the Fraser Canyon Indian Administration, one of three tribal councils of the Nlakaʼpamux people. Other members of the Fraser Canyon Indian Administration are the Kanaka Bar, Skuppah and Nicomen First Nations (the Nicomen First Nation is also a member of the Nicola Tribal Association).

The Spuzzum First Nation reserve community and offices are located at Spuzzum in the lower Fraser Canyon, near the Alexandra Bridge and about 10 miles north of Yale.

Other Nlakaʼpamux governments belong either to the Nicola Tribal Association or the Nlakaʼpamux Nation Tribal Council.

== History ==
The chief of the Spuzzum in 1858, Kowpelst ("White Hat") was one of the first to work Hill's Bar at the onset of the Fraser Canyon Gold Rush and was considered a "friendly Indian" during the Fraser Canyon War of that fall, which took place between the American miners and the upstream Nlaka'pamux of Camchin. He was appointed as a magistrate by Sir James Douglas. During the Fraser Canyon War, a few thousand miners from bars further up the canyon thronged at Spuzzum in terror of the upstream Nlaka'pamux. Some villages and food caches of the Spuzzum people were destroyed by armed parties of miners traveling from Yale, even though relations with the Spuzzum were deemed friendlier than with their Nlaka'pamux kin further upriver.

== Reserve lands ==
Spuzzum First Nation has sixteen different reserves ranging greatly in size, and totaling 648 hectares (2.50 sq mi). The largest two (Spuzzum 1 and 1a) stand on the West Bank of the Fraser River near the mouth of Spuzzum Creek.

Name	Hectares
Chapman's Bar 10	2.80
Long Tunnel 5	2.60
Long Tunnel 5a	35.90
Papsilqua 2	16.60
Papsilqua 2A	27.70
Papsilqua 2B	20.30
Saddle Rock 9	32
Skuet 6	4.70
Spuzzum 1	125.30
Spuzzum 1A	126.50
Spuzzum 7	46.10
Stout 8	47.90
Teequaloose 3	7.70
Teequaloose 3A	60.40
Yelakin 4	26.80
Yelakin 4A	64.70
Combined area	648

== Spuzzum people ==
- Annie York
- Carl Stromquist
- Brenda Crabtree, a Spuzzum weaver at the Emily Carr University of Art and Design,

== Chief and Councillors ==
Councillor Diana Stromquist, and Interim Chief - Janice Kuester.

== Demographics ==
The 1878 Reserve Commission census found 237 people living in Spuzzum and neighbouring villages. The 1881 census listed only 146 people, but the number is dubious since that era (during construction of the Canadian Pacific Railway) would likely have been the community's peak population. Other estimates places the Indigenous population at the time around 400.

As of September 2015, the community had a registered population of 274, though only 46 lived on reserve.

== See also ==
- Thompson language
