= First Nations Health Authority =

Canadian health service delivery organization

- Type: British Columbia Health Authority
- CEO-Interim: Richard Jock
- Website: www.fnha.ca

The First Nations Health Authority (FNHA) is a health service delivery organization responsible for administering a variety of health programs and service for First Nations people living in British Columbia (BC).

== Overview ==
The FNHA is part of a First Nations Health Governance Structure in BC that includes the First Nations Health Council and First Nations Health Directors Association. The First Nations Health Authority emerged from a number of Tripartite agreements between First Nations in BC, the Province of BC, and the Government of Canada that included the Transformative Change Accord: First Nations Health Plan, Tripartite First Nations Health Plan [2007], and the Tripartite Framework Agreement on First Nations Health Governance. A first for Canada, the FNHA is the first province-wide First Nations Health Authority in Canada. The FNHA plans, designs, manages and funds the delivery of First Nations health programs and services in BC. These community-based services are largely focused on health promotion and disease prevention – such as:

- Primary Care Services
- Mental Health and Addictions Programming
- Health Infrastructure
- Environmental Health and Research
- Non-Insured Health Benefits

The FNHA strives to improve First Nations health outcomes and close the gaps that exist between First Nations people in BC and the rest of the provincial population. The FNHA serves both the urban and rural First Nations population that includes 203 communities throughout the province.

On October 1, 2013, the FNHA completed the second phase transfer of federal programs and services from Health Canada.

== Drinking water advisories ==
Drinking water advisories include Boil Water Advisory (BWA), Do Not Consume (DNC), and Do Not Use (DNU) are put in place by the FNHA's Environmental Public Health Services (EPHS). FNHA in British Columbia monitors 285 community water systems in 193 First Nations in British Columbia. In 2011, 11 long term advisories that had lasted longer than 12 months, were lifted. In 2016 and in 2017, 7 long term advisories were lifted. By January 31, 2019 there were 10 Drinking Water Advisories in effect across 8 First Nation communities.
