= Annie York =

Canadian First Nation elder (1904–1991)

- Annie Zixtkwu York

Elder of the Nlaka'pamux people of the Spuzzum First Nation

Personal details
- Born: September 21, 1904 Spuzzum, British Columbia, Canada
- Died: August 19, 1992 (aged 87) Spuzzum, British Columbia, Canada
- Cause of death: Tuberculosis
- Parent(s): Lucy Palmer York and William Benjamin
- Occupation: Author

Annie Zixtkwu York (September 21, 1904 – August 19, 1991) was a distinguished elder of the Nlaka'pamux people (also known as Thompson) of the Spuzzum First Nation of Spuzzum, in Fraser Canyon located in the lower region of British Columbia, Canada. York was raised by her Nlaka'pamux family where she came to be bilingual speaking English and Nlaka'pamuctsin. She dedicated herself to the Christian religion and the beliefs of the Nlaka'pamux people, Nle'kepmx. York's family members educated her about the history of Spuzzum as well as the origin of its name, Spuzzum chiefs, and the ethnobotany of the region. York was known to be a storyteller, always recording and sharing stories.

Annie York was a co-author of two published novels, Spuzzum: Fraser Canyon Histories 1808-1939 and They Write Their Dreams on the Rock Forever: Rock Writings of the Stein River Valley of British Columbia. She was the subject of the movie, Bowl of Bone: Tale of The Syuwe.

== Early life ==
York was born on September 21, 1904, in Spuzzum territory in British Columbia. She died August 19, 1991, due to tuberculosis in Spuzzum. York was the third of seven children born to William Benjamin and Lucy Palmer York. Her mother was of English and Nlaka'pamux descent while her father was a Nlaka'pamux man whose family all originated from Spuzzum territory. Though York's father was Nlaka'pamux, her mother's mixed heritage did not allow the family to live together in Spuzzum territory. Therefore, York's family moved to Fraser Canyon in British Columbia. In her time in Fraser Canyon, her family prohibited her to return to Spuzzum territory given the situation with her mother. York grew up living with her mother's Nlaka'pamux family as well as with Amelia York, her grandmother from her father's side. York came to be bilingual speaking both English and Nlaka'pamux language.

== Personal life ==
York decided to return to Spuzzum territory and live with her aunt Rhoda Urquhart and her cousin Arthur Urquhart. Annie dedicated herself to the Christian religion and the Nlaka'pamux beliefs. Because she was bilingual, she prayed and sang in Nlaka'pamuctsin as well as translated it to English. Three songs she translated were "A Song of Seasons", "Simon Fraser's Song", and "The Song for Mount Baker". York was never married nor did she have any children. She spent the last of her years in Spuzzum with her cousin Arthur Urquhart, where they both took care of each other.

== Education ==
York's time was largely spent with her family, listening to family members' stories. Through the stories told, she became educated about Spuzzum's history. York explained that Spuzzum received its name due to how flat the area is and the word spuzzum means flat. York was educated on Spuzzum chiefs and the impact that each chief had on their people. She explained that Chief Paul was known for educating his people about manners and religion through prayers, and Chief Peleck was known for teaching the people about religion by having hymns and prayers be translated to the Nlaka'pamux language. York also was educated in botany. Lastly, in the 1920s, she studied nursing in Merritt, British Columbia, but did not graduate.

== Folklore ==
Annie York was known to be a storyteller who would share the tales about the lakes in British Columbia. York was also known to tape record her stories. One story she told was of a lake near Fraser Canyon, where the logs at the lake would mysteriously move to the center at night, and in the morning, the logs would be spread out again. About Lake Nicola, York recounted the tale of a young girl who saw an eel in the lake and it mysteriously paralyzed her.

== Career ==
Annie York was a co-author of two published novels, Spuzzum: Fraser Canyon Histories 1808-1939 and They Write Their Dreams on the Rock Forever: Rock Writings of the Stein River Valley of British Columbia. York assisted and showcased her personal history in the film Bowl of Bone: Tale of the Syuwe.

=== Spuzzum: Fraser Canyon Histories 1808-1939 ===
The authors of Spuzzum: Fraser Canyon Histories 1808-1939 were Annie York and Andrea Laforet. The novel takes place in Fraser Canyon and occurs during colonization The novel emphasizes and preserves the history of the Nlaka'pamux people undergoing colonization. The history is captured through York's experience along with her knowledge of her family's experiences.

=== They Write Their Dreams on the Rock Forever: Rock Writings of the Stein River Valley of British Columbia ===
The authors of They Write Their Dreams on the Rock Forever: Rock Writings of the Stein River Valley of British Columbia are Annie York, Richard Daly, and Chris Arnett. The novel takes place in Stein River Valley in British Columbia. In the novel, Annie York showcases the writings on the rocks and explains the meaning of the writings, giving the reader insights into how people lived in Stein River Valley. This novel was published with the intent of spreading awareness on the importance of the writings on the rocks found in Stein River Valley.

=== Film ===
Bowl of Bone: Tale of the Syuwe directed by Jan-Marie Martell and produced by Annie York takes place in the late 1900s. The film brings the audience along Martell's journey in meeting York and in learning about the Syuwe under York's unique teaching style.

== In media ==
=== Featured in journals ===
Annie York's knowledge about Spuzzum's history, lifestyle, and botany has led to her inclusion in several published works.

- The Original "Free Trade": Exchange of Botanical Products and Associated Plant Knowledge in Northwestern North America by Nancy J. Turner and Dawn C. Loewen.
- Thompson Ethnobotany: Knowledge and Usage of Plants by the Thompson Indians of British Columbia written by Nancy Turner, Laurence Thompson, M. Terry Thompson, and Annie York.
- "That was Our Candy!": Sweet Foods in Indigenous Peoples' Traditional Diets in Northwestern North America written by Nancy J. Turner.
