= Siska Indian Band =

Band of Indigenous peoples in British Columbia, Canada

Siska Indian Band (Thompson: sísqeʔ) is located in the Fraser Canyon region of the Canadian province of British Columbia. It was previously a member of the Scw’exmx Tribal Council, which is a tribal council of the Nlaka'pamux people. Other Nlaka'pamux governments belong either to the Fraser Canyon Indian Administration or the Nlaka'pamux Nation Tribal Council, although the large Lytton First Nation, north of Siska, does not belong to any of the three.

The Siska Indian Band reserve community and offices are located adjacent to the Trans-Canada Highway (Hwy 1) between Lytton and Boston Bar.

== Chief and councillors ==
- Fred Sampson Chief
- Angela Phillips Councillor
- Betsy Munro Councillor

== History ==
The location of Siska is most notable for the dual railbridge crossing of the two Canadian transcontinental railways, the CPR and CNR, just above the reserve. Siska is often spelled in historical documents and publications as "Cisco", a spelling which remains on the map for the railway points at this location and also for Cisco Bluff, which the CPR line pierces opposite Siska Flat, which is the location of the main rancherie of the First Nation.

== Economic development ==
The Siska Band has undertaken to develop a line of natural ethnobotany products based on traditional food and medicinal plants, as an alternative to logging and other resource extraction uses on their traditional territory. This initiative takes place under Siska Traditions Society, a non-profit community driven organization focusing on linking culture, language and community economic diversity.

== Social, educational and cultural programs and facilities ==
- Siska Museum

== Reserves ==
- Kupchynalth Indian Reserve No.1
- Kupchynalth Indian Reserve No.2
- Siska Flat Indian Reserve No. 3
- Moosh Indian Reserve No.4
- Zacht Indian Reserve No.5
- Siska Flat Indian Reserve No.5A
- Siska Flat Indian Reserve No.5B
- Humhampt Indian Reserve No.6
- Humhampt Indian Reserve No.6A
- Nahamanak Indian Reserve No.7
- Siska Flat Indian Reserve No.8

== See also ==
- Nicola (chief)
- Thompson language
