= Boothroyd Indian Band =

The Boothroyd First Nation (Thompson: k̓emus, historically spelt as Kahmoose) is a First Nations government Fraser Canyon area of the Central Interior of the Canadian province of British Columbia. Located near Boston Bar, it is a member of the Nlaka'pamux Nation Tribal Council along with the Boston Bar First Nation, also located in Boston Bar, and the Ashcroft First Nation near the town of Ashcroft.

Other Nlaka'pamux bands belong to the Nicola Tribal Association or the Fraser Canyon Indian Administration.

== See also ==
- Thompson language
