= Gitanyow =

Coordinates: 55°16′00″N 128°04′00″W

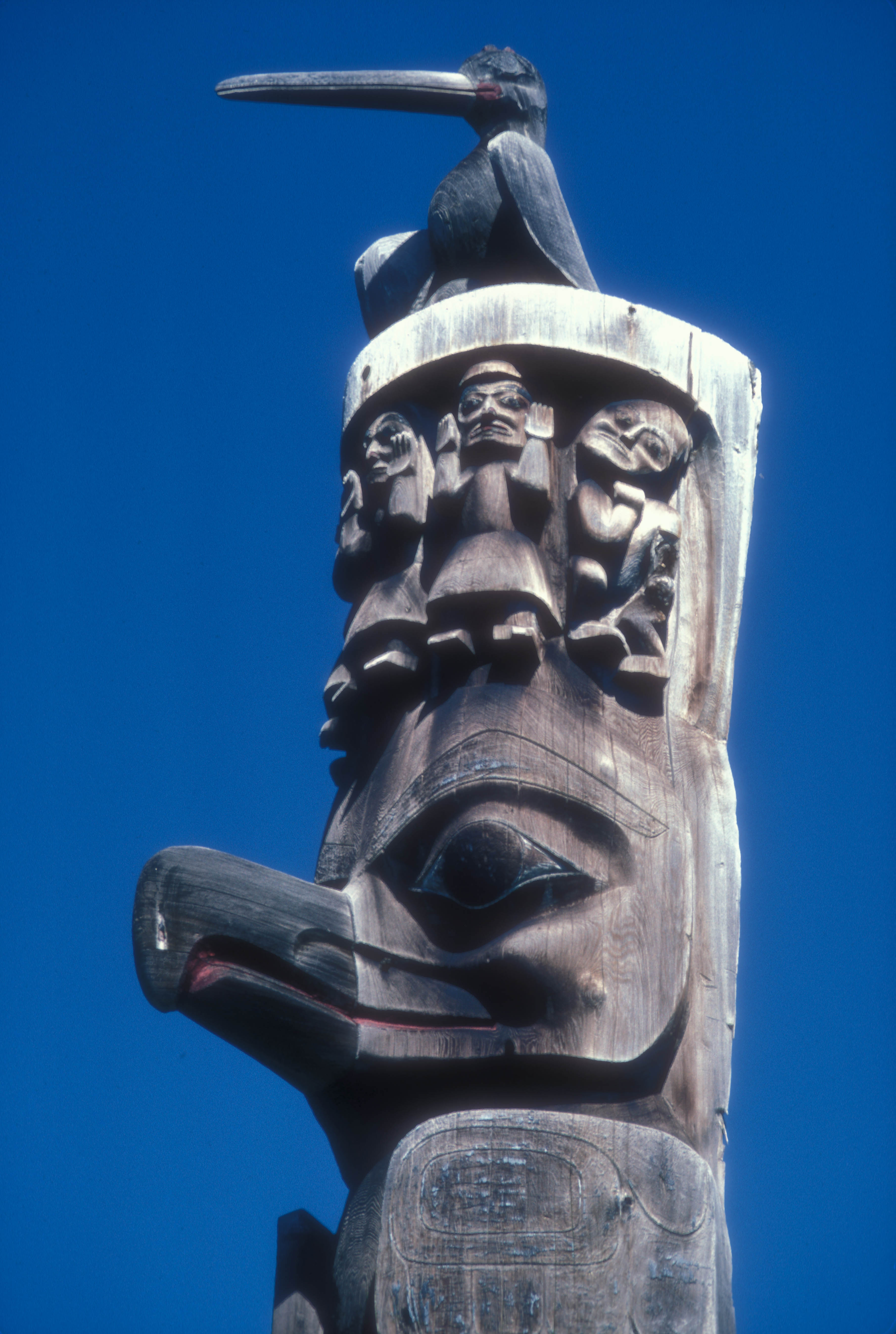
At the historic site

Gitanyow is an Indian reserve community of the Gitxsan people, located on the Kitwanga River 8 km south of Kitwancool Lake, at the confluence of Kitwancool Creek. The community is located on Gitanyow Indian Reserve No. 1.

Gitanyow was formerly named Kitwancool as was the Indian Reserve it is located on. The band government changed its name from the Kitwancool Indian Band to the Gitanyow Band in 1991. In 1994 the Gitanyow Hereditary Chiefs, the governing body of the band, renamed themselves Sim-Gi-Get'm Gitanyow and asked that localities on the Kitwancool Indian reserve henceforth be identified as Gitanyow.

The village of about 400 people is a National Historic Site of Canada.

== See also ==
- 'Ksan
- Kitwanga Fort National Historic Site
