= Oregon Jack Creek Band =

First Nations government in Canada

- Headquarters: Ashcroft, British Columbia
- Province: British Columbia

Oregon Jack Creek Band is a First Nations government in the Thompson Canyon area of the Southern Interior of the Canadian province of British Columbia. Its Indian Reserves and offices are located near the town of Ashcroft, it is a member of the Nlaka'pamux Nation Tribal Council.

Other Nlaka'pamux governments belong either to the Nicola Tribal Association or the Fraser Canyon Indian Administration.

== See also ==
- Thompson language
