= Camchin =

Indigenous reserve and former village in British Columbia, Canada

Coordinates: 50°14′00″N 121°34′00″W

Camchin, also spelled Kumsheen, is an anglicization of the ancient name for the locality and Indigenous village once located on the site of today's village of Lytton, British Columbia, Canada, whose name in Nlaka'pamuctsin is ƛ'q'əmcín. It also refers to the main Indian reserve community of the Lytton First Nation adjacent to the Village of Lytton and is found in the form "Kumsheen" in local business and school names.

The name means in general "rivers meeting" but has also been translated "crossing over" and "the great fork." It is the ancient Nlaka'pamuctsin name for the confluence of the Thompson and Fraser Rivers, in the Fraser Canyon of British Columbia, Canada. The meaning refers to the location as the heart of the Nlaka'pamux Nation, and a creation story that accounts the Nlaka'pamux hero "Coyote" being disemboweled by a giant shape shifting spirit-being known as "the Transformer" involves his heart being thrown into the confluence of the Fraser and Thompson Rivers.

The area is one of the longest continuously inhabited areas in North America. It’s believed that First Nations have inhabited the area for the past 10,000 years.
