= Coldwater Indian Band =

Nlaka'pamux First Nations government

Coldwater First Nation (Thompson: Cʼeletkwmx) is a Nlaka'pamux First Nations government located in the Central Interior region of the Canadian province of British Columbia. It is a member of the Scw’exmx Tribal Council, which are two of three tribal councils of the Nlaka'pamux people. Other Nlaka'pamux governments belong either to the Fraser Canyon Indian Administration or the Nlaka'pamux Nation Tribal Council.

The Coldwater First Nation reserve community and offices are located in the band's home community of Coldwater, formerly the site of the Coldwater Mission, near Merritt, the main urban centre in the Nicola Country region between the Lower Mainland and Kamloops.

== Indian reserves ==
The territory under the jurisdiction of Coldwater Band consists of the three following reserves:

- Coldwater 1
- Paul's Basin 2
- Gwen Lake 3

== See also ==
- Nicola (chief)
- Scw'exmx
- Thompson language
