= Cook's Ferry Indian Band =

First Nation government in British Columbia, Canada

- Headquarters: Spences Bridge, British Columbia
- Province: British Columbia

Cook's Ferry First Nation is a Nlaka'pamux First Nations government, located in the Central Interior region of the Canadian province of British Columbia. It is no longer a member of the Scw'exmx Tribal Council, because they were voted out (which is a tribal council of the Nlaka'pamux people). Other Nlaka'pamux governments belong either to the Fraser Canyon Indian Administration or the Nlaka'pamux Nation Tribal Council (except for the Lytton First Nation, which is unaffiliated).

Cook's Ferry First Nation reserve community and offices are located near Spences Bridge, a small town on the Trans-Canada Highway (Hwy 1) in the Thompson Canyon between Lytton and Cache Creek, at the confluence of the Nicola River and the Thompson.

== Reserves ==
Cook's Ferry First Nation has jurisdiction over the following reserves:

- Kumcheen 1 - 69.7 Ha - 18 Dwellings
- Skoonkoon 2 - 17.4 Ha - 0 Dwellings
- Shawniken 3 - 13.8 Ha - 0 Dwellings
- Spences Bridge 4 - 11.7 Ha - 2 Dwellings
- Lower Shawniken 4A
- Shawniken 4B - 13.4 Ha - 8 Dwellings
- Spences Bridge 4C - 10.4 Ha - 3 Dwellings
- Chuchhriaschin 5 - 8.1 Ha - 0 Dwellings
- Chuchhriaschin 5A - 8.1 Ha - 0 Dwellings
- Nicoelton 6 - 812.8 Ha - 0 Dwellings
- Kloklowuck 7 - 83.8 Ha - 3 Dwellings
- Tsinkahtl 8 - 5.2 Ha - 0 Dwellings
- Upper Tsinkahtl 8A - 4.1 Ha - 0 Dwellings
- Pemynoos 9 - 1823.3 Ha - 5 Dwellings
- Pokheitsk 10 - 8.7 Ha - 0 Dwellings
- Spatsum 11 - 65.8 Ha - 0 Dwellings
- Spatsum 11A - 70.3 Ha - 0 Dwellings
- Chilthunux 12 - 386.00Acres
- Quiltanton 13 - 545.00 Acres
- Enquocto 14 - 560.00 Acres
- Squetankilhats 15 - 520.00Acres
- Schikaelton 16 - 0.2 Ha - 0 Dwellings
- Twoyqhalsht 16 - 11.1 Ha - 1 Dwellings
- Lish-Leesh-Tum 17 - 18.9 Ha - 0 Dwellings
- Basque 18 - 428.4 Ha - 3 Dwellings
- Entlqwekkinh 19 - 64.8 Ha - 3 Dwellings
- Shpapzchinh 20 - 210.4 Ha - 0 Dwellings
- Antko 21 (Merritt) - 14.2 Ha - 0 Dwellings
- Peq-Paq 22 - 186.1 Ha - 0 Dwellings

Total: 3960.7 Ha - 46 Dwellings

== See also ==
- Nicola (chief)
- Thompson language
