= Shackan First Nation =

Nlaka'pamux First Nations government in British Columbia, Canada

- Headquarters: Merritt, British Columbia
- Province: British Columbia

Government
- Chief: Lindsay Tighe

Website
- https://www.shackan.ca/

Shackan First Nation (Thompson: Sx̣íx̣nx) is a Nlaka'pamux First Nations government located in the Nicola Country of the Southern Interior region of the Canadian province of British Columbia. It is a member of the Scw’exmx Tribal Council, which is one of three tribal councils of the Nlaka'pamux people. Other Nlaka'pamux governments belong either to the Fraser Canyon Indian Administration or the Nlaka'pamux Nation Tribal Council.

Shackan Indian Band reserve community and offices are located just west of Merritt, the main urban centre in the Nicola Country region between the Lower Mainland and Kamloops.

The name Shackan is an adaptation from Sxe'xn'x (Sx̣íx̣nx), which is its name in the local dialect of Nlaka'pamuctsin (the Thompson language).

== Chief and Councillors ==
Chief: Lindsay Tighe

Councillors:

1) Jordan Joe 2) Savannah Joe

== History ==
The Sxe'xn'x (meaning Little Rocks in Sxe'xn'x dialect of the Nlakapamux ) have occupied their territories in the Nicola Valley and surrounding region since time immemorial. Prior to the arrival of non-Natives, the resources of the Nicola Valley were managed by the Nlakapamux to enhance and maintain settlement, food, and medicine gathering, hunting, fishing, horse grazing, fur trapping, and trade. By the year 1857, the Sxe'xn'x had begun to incorporate gold mining and agriculture as new economic strategies.

Following non-Native settlement in the Nicola Valley, Indian Reserves were laid out by Indian Reserve Commissioner, Gilbert Sproat, in August 1878. As one of several reserves laid out for the Lower Nicola Indian Band, was created near the Scw'exmx village of "Kapatci'tcîn". Sproat described the site as "Potatoe Gardens" or "Skachin". In the same month, to other reserves near to "Potatoe Gardens" were also established: "Papsilqua [I.R. #13], used for raising hay and as grazing pasture, with access to water for irrigation; and Soldatquo [I.R. #12], used mainly as grazing pasture.

Shackan Indian Band and Nooatich Indian Band was formed in the early 1950s after splitting from the Lower Nicola Indian Band.

== Demographics ==
total population 131

== Economic development ==
Shackan is into Forestry Management, joint Sawmill operation with Lower Nicola Indian Band, and several other joint Ventures.

== Reserves ==
The band has jurisdiction over the three following reserves:

- Shackan 11
- Soldatquo 12
- Papsilqua 13

== See also ==
- Nicola (chief)
- Thompson language
