= Nlakaʼpamux =

Ethnic group of British Columbia

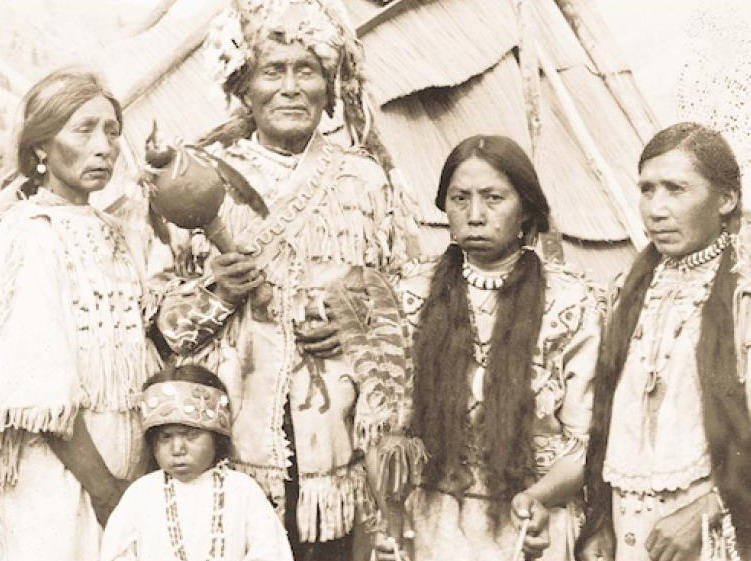
- Members of a Nlakaʼpamux community, c. 1914

Total population
- 3,105 (2016 census)

Regions with significant populations
- Canada (British Columbia), United States (Washington)

Languages
- English, Nlakaʼpamuctsin

Religion
- Christianity (Anglicanism and Catholicism), Animism

Related ethnic groups
- Okanagan, Nicola people, Nicola Athapaskans

The Nlakaʼpamux or Nlakapamuk (/ɪŋkləˈkæpmə/ ing-klə-KAP-mə; Salishan: [nɬeʔképmx]), also previously known as the Thompson, Thompson River Salish, Thompson Salish, Thompson River Indians or Thompson River people, and historically as the Klackarpun, Haukamaugh, Knife Indians, and Couteau Indians, are an Indigenous First Nations people of the Interior Salish language group in southern British Columbia. Their traditional territory includes parts of the North Cascades region of Washington.

== Other names ==
Dance Song of the Thompson River Indians
Phonograph cylinder recording of song by Nlakaʼpamux in British Columbia, 1897.

Frontier-era histories and maps transliterate the name Nlakaʼpamux as Hakamaugh or Klackarpun; they were also known as the Kootomin, or Couteau (Knife). or Knife Indians. In the dialect of the Thompson language used by the Ashcroft Indian Band, the variant Nlʼakapxm is used.

The Nlakaʼpamux of the Nicola Valley, who are all in the Nicola Tribal Association reserves refer to themselves as Scwʼexmx and speak a different dialect of the Thompson language. Together with the Spaxomin people, a branch of the Okanagan people (Syilx) who live in the upper Nicola valley and also belong to the Nicola Tribal Association, they are collectively known as the Nicola people, or Nicolas.

== Ethnobotany ==
Blueberries (Vaccinium myrtilloides) are traditionally used by the Nlakaʼpamux in pies. They have used the leaves of sedge (Carex) as brushes for cleaning and also as forage for their livestock.

== Religion ==
The Nlakaʼpamux were the object of both Anglican and Roman Catholic missionary efforts in the nineteenth century, resulting in the vast majority belonging to one of the two denominations by the beginning of the twentieth century.

== Governments ==
The Nlakaʼpamux Nation Tribal Council despite its name does not include all Nlakaʼpamux people, but is one of two main tribal bodies within the region, the other being the Nicola Tribal Association. The Lytton First Nation or Lytton Band, focussed on the town of the same name, which is named Camchin or Kumsheen in the Nlakaʼpamux language and is one of the largest Nlakaʼpamux communities, does not belong to any of the three tribal associations. While the Upper Nicola Band is affiliated with the Scwʼexmx Tribal Council it is a Syilx community and part of the Okanagan Nation Alliance it is not Nlakaʼpamux and has a different traditional territory than the other Nlakaʼpamux Bands.

None of the Nlakaʼpamux governments are in the British Columbia Treaty Commission process at present.

=== Nlakaʼpamux Nation Tribal Council ===
- Boothroyd Indian Band
- Boston Bar Indian Band
- Oregon Jack Creek Indian Band
- Spuzzum Indian Band
- Lytton Indian Band
- Skuppah Indian Band

=== Scwʼexmx Tribal Council (Originally Nicola Tribal Association or NTA) ===
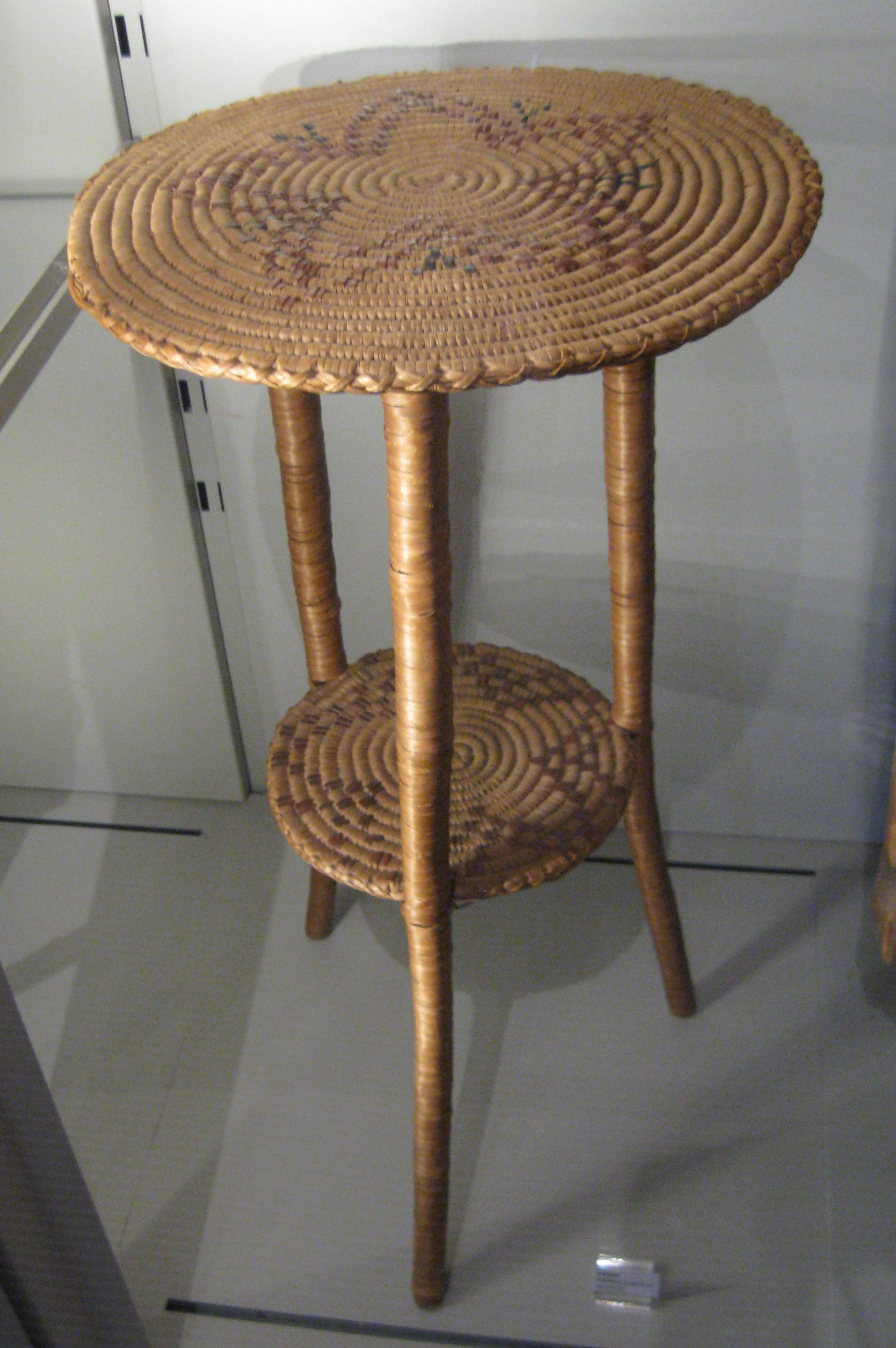
A Nlakaʼpamux table.

- Shackan Indian Band (Original NTA)
- Nooaitch Indian Band (Original NTA)
- Upper Nicola Band (Original NTA)(A member of the Okanagan Nation Alliance)
- Coldwater Indian Band (Original NTA)

=== Unaffiliated ===
- Ashcroft Indian Band
- Kanaka Bar Indian Band
- Lower Nicola Indian Band
- Siska Indian Band
- Cook's Ferry Indian Band
- Nicomen Indian Band (Former member of the Fraser Canyon Indian Administration)

== Language ==
The Nlakaʼpamux speak an Interior Salishan language named nɬeʔkepmxcín, usually transliterated as Nlakaʼpamuxtsn and known in English as the Thompson language. The Scwʼexmx of the Nicola Valley speak a dialect also called Scwʼexmx.

== Notable people ==
- Tara Beagan, writer and actress
- G. A. Grisenthwaite, writer
- Kevin Loring, writer
- Terese Marie Mailhot, writer
- Sharon McIvor, activist
- Ilona Verley, drag queen and make-up artist
- Annie York, writer

== See also ==
- Scwʼexmx
- Sxeʼxnʼx
