= Kaska Nation =

Canadian First Nations tribal council

Kaska Nation is a tribal council of First Nations in northern British Columbia, southern Yukon, and the southwestern Northwest Territories in Canada.

== Membership ==
The Kaska Nation is made up of three First Nations including:

| First Nation Number | First Nation Name | Comments | Reference |
|---|---|---|---|
| 504 | Dease River First Nation | | |
| 502 | Liard First Nation | | |
| 497 | Ross River Dena Council | | |
| 610 | Kwadacha First Nation | Culturally Tsek'ene. Formerly known, in English, as Fort Ware First Nation. | |
| | Lower Post First Nation | Canada does not classify the Lower Post First Nation as a band, but rather as one of eight reserves belonging to the Yukon-based Liard First Nation | |

== History ==
The Kaska Nations are a part of the Canadian Northern Athabaskan also referred to as the Dene. It is not known where the name "Kaska" came from though: one theory is that it came from the word in the Tahltan language for their tribe, or it could have come from Europeans and been influenced by a native word they associated with a place nearby. It is believed by members of the Kaska Nations that the Ross River Natives are descended from the Tlingit and the rest of the Nations formed as groups from the Ross River tribe left to explore and settled in other areas.

=== European contact ===
The Kaska's first contact with Europeans began in the 1820s with traders from the Hudson Bay Company. The Hudson's Bay Company and the North West Company began setting up trading settlements where the Smith River and Liard River meet in 1821. One trader from the Hudson's Bay Company, J. McLeod, left the trading company to set up his open trading post on the Dease lake which is where some members of the Kaska nations found him and began trading for European goods. The Hudson Bay Company would later end up taking over this trading post and setting up more near the Kaska tribe.

== Geography ==
Their traditional homelands are roughly 93,000 square miles in current day Canada starting in South East Yukon, some of the South West portion of the Northwest Territories, and going down into northern British Columbia.

Of the five Kaska Nations, three are located in British Columbia. These are the Lower Post First Nation (also referred to as the Daylu Dena Council), the Kwadacha First Nation, and the Dease River First Nation. The other two Nations are located in the Yukon and those are the Liard and the Ross River Dena Council.

== Culture ==
=== Language ===
The Kaska language is referred to by them as Dene k’éh and is one of the Northern Dene language with many similarities to other nearby Northern Dene languages. The Kaska language is made up of four separate dialects which can each be understood by those who speak the other dialects as well as those who speak other Athabaskan dialects which are not a part of the Kaska language. The Kaska language is, like most Athabaskan languages, a tone language so they utilize variations in pitch to differentiate different words. Over time a small amount of words from other languages, mainly French and words from the Tlingit language, have been incorporated into their own language.

=== Religious/spiritual beliefs ===
The Kaska believe that there have been several different periods of the world and that the period they are in was ended by a flood at some point, but eventually restored by Crow.

==== Important figures ====
In their original beliefs there was no single Supreme entity, but there were other significant figures in their mythology. They had heroes like Kliatata, who supposedly taught the Kaskas skills for fishing, as well as another, Tsuguya, who was told about in stories for his escapades. There were also non-human figures in their beliefs like an evil figure called Guslina, a North Wind Man who had control of the cold and used it to cause harm to those living where he brought it, and giants who ate people. There were also good, non-human figures like friendly giants and dwarves who worked with humans to help them.

==== Post-European beliefs ====
Interactions with Kaska informants in the 1940s show evidence of assimilation into Christian beliefs. This can be seen in their beliefs that Jesus created everything and in their Supreme being or Head Man who is in control of all of the other bosses of nature. This Supreme being is also referred to as God or Jesus.

=== Ceremonies ===
Feasts were held to commemorate important milestones in one's life such as the birth of a child, marriage, and the first time a youth successfully hunts an animal. Potlaches are also held when someone in the community dies. The Potlaches were only held by the western bands there was dancing, gift exchanges, and feasting. In the dances the dancers would dance to a tambourine drum, which was the only instrument they had, and would wear wooden masks and costumes made of animal skins. Potlaches were still held post-contact, but much more rarely with two in 1945 being the first ones held in 15 years.

=== Family ===
Polygamy, while not always practiced, was accepted in Kaska society, but mainly for men and only if they were skilled enough at hunting to provide for a larger family with multiple wives and more children. In these circumstances the wives had to also be sisters, the wives could not just be any two women. Polygamy was accepted for women as well, but only if the man became too old to effectively provide for his family. Marriages could be between tribal members and captive women, but there were rules regarding marriage outside of the tribe and incest, however marriage between specific kids of cross cousins were accepted and encouraged. After marriage the couple would usually live near the women's family as a matrilocal residence was favored.

Each individual family would have been able to fully support themselves with the environmental resources necessary, but two families would have shared one lean-to dwelling. These dwellings were temporary as the Kaska tribes had to be able to travel to get the necessary resources.

=== Recreation ===
Recreational activities for the Kaska Nations changed from pre- and post-contact with Europeans. Traditionally their recreational activities mainly consisted of competitions that tested skill and strength like throwing and archery as well as wrestling and holding races. There were also a couple of games played. Post European contact activities like jumping rope, playing tug of war, and the summer hand game also became popular.

Social Activities that were popular post contact included drinking parties consisting of home-brewed drinks and seasonal dances with people playing musical instruments that were introduced by Europeans like flutes and guitars. Dancing was mainly done by couples but there were square dances held when Tahltan visitors came.

=== Clothing ===
Traditional clothing in Kaska culture is made by women and mainly out of caribou hides. Both sexes wore similar clothing made up of a breechcloth with a coat, both made of tanned caribou skin, and with porcupine quills for support in the coat. these two pieces made up the base layers which are worn year-round, but in winter these pieces were combined with fur coats made from either sheep or caribou. Their clothes were also decorated with fringe, hard-pellets from moose tripe, and embroidery with porcupine quills. The fringe was made from animal skins and was used on the shoulders and bottom edge of men's winter parkas, while the hard pellets and embroidery were used on women's clothing. Moccasins and mittens were also worn and were made from either moose or caribou hides.

=== Settlement ===
The Kaska First nations are nomadic so they rely heavily on being able to travel to different areas in search of resources. The main methods of transportation are by use of toboggan, canoe, or by foot with the use of snowshoes.

== Government ==
The Kaska Dena council is made up of the three British Columbia Nations and they are the only ones who actively negotiate with the Canadian government. The two Yukon Nations are not actively involved with any of the negotiations.

=== Pre-European contact ===
Before European contact the Kaska Nations were organized in small bands centered around one family. These bands had a very unofficial form of organization where there was generally one main man that would lead the band. However, some of the Kaska tribes in the western region followed a matrilineal style of organization. The Kaska First Nations also considered themselves to be one nation, despite being geographically separated and didn't abide by strict territories with each other before European contact. After contact with Europeans strict boundaries were set between the different Kaska bands as Europeans began creating towns and the Nations were officially separated into the current five bands as a result of the Indian Act.

=== Treaties ===
There are two completed treaties between the Kaska Nations and the Canadian Government, both treaties are with the three British Columbia Kaska Nations. These two treaties are the Kaska Dena Council Incremental Treaty Agreement from 2013 and the Kaska Dena Council Incremental Treaty Amending Agreement from 2016. Since 1993 the Kaska Dena council has been actively in treaty negotiations with the government of British Columbia.

=== Other negotiations ===
There are five forest agreements all with the British Columbia Kaska Nations. These agreements span from 2005 to 2014. There was also one more negotiation called the Kaska Dena Council Strategic Engagement Agreement which was also with the three Kaska Nations in British Columbia.

== See also ==
- List of tribal councils in British Columbia
