= Ashcroft Indian Band =

First Nation government in British Columbia, Canada

Ashcroft First Nation (Thompson: sƛ̓ə́z) is a First Nations government Thompson Canyon area of the Central Interior of the Canadian province of British Columbia. Its Indian Reserves are located near the town of Ashcroft, British Columbia, it is a member of the Nlaka'pamux Nation Tribal Council.

Other Nlaka'pamux bands belong to the Nicola Tribal Association or the Fraser Canyon Indian Administration.

== Indian Reserves ==
Indian Reserves under the administration of Ashcroft First Nation are:

- 105 Mile Post Indian Reserve No. 2, along the right (N) bank of the Thompson River, west of the town of Ashcroft, 1365.60 ha. 50°44′00″N 121°19′00″W
- Ashcroft Indian Reserve No. 4, south of and adjoining 105 Mile Post IR 2, 123.30 ha. 50°43′00″N 121°19′00″W
- Cheetsum's Farm Indian Reserve No. 1, on right (N) bank of the Thompson River at mouth of Cheetsum Creek, 298.90 ha. 50°41′00″N 121°19′00″W
- McLean's Lake Indian Reserve No. 3, on McLean Lake, 7 miles NW of the town of Ashcroft, 198.30 ha. 50°47′00″N 121°24′00″W

== See also ==
- Thompson language
- Nl'akapxm Eagle Motorplex
