= Tʼitʼqʼet First Nation =

First Nations government in British Columbia, Canada

The Tʼitʼqʼet also known as the Tʼitʼkʼit, the Tlʼitlʼkit and as the Lillooet Indian Band, is a First Nations government located in the Central Interior-Fraser Canyon region of the Canadian province of British Columbia.

The Tʼitʼqʼetʼs offices are located at Lillooet, British Columbia. Also located in and immediately around the town of Lillooet are the Cayoose Creek First Nation and the Bridge River Indian Band, although the Tʼitʼqʼetʼs reserve and community are located immediately adjacent to the main part of town. Also nearby are the Fountain First Nation, 10 miles up the Fraser River, and the Seton Lake First Nation, whose nearest reserve is only 15 miles away along Seton Lake, but is accessible to and from town only by lake, rail or a tortuous mountain and canyon road via the Bridge River. Also considered to be in "Greater Lillooet" is the Indian reserve and ranching community of Pavilion, 20 miles up the Fraser from Lillooet, which is home to the Tsʼkwʼaylaxw First Nation, or Pavilion Band (also spelled Tsʼkwʼaylacw Nation).

== Indian Reserves ==
Indian Reserves under the administration of the T'it'q'et First Nation are:

- Kilchult Indian Reserve No. 3, on the right (west) bank of the Fraser River between Chad and Riley Creeks, 42.10 ha.
- Lillooet Indian Reserve No. 1, immediately west of the town of Lillooet and north of the Seton River, 364.50 ha. Known commonly as the Lillooet Rancherie
- Lillooet Indian Reserve No. 1A, on the right (west) bank of the Fraser River one mile NW of the town of Lillooet, 797.20 ha. Shared with the Bridge River Indian Band
- McCartney's Flat Indian Reserve No. 4, on the left (east) bank of the Fraser River two miles S of Lillooet opposite Towinock Indian Reserve No. 2, and including a gravesite one mile north of IR No. 4., 171.40 ha.
- Riley Creek Indian Reserve No. 1B, right (west) bank of the Fraser River, 8 miles S of Lillooet, south of an adjoining Kilchult Indian Reserve No. 3, 31.20 ha.
- Seton Lake Indian Reserve No. 5, at the foot of Seton Lake and along the Seton River, 3 miles SW of Lillooet, 1.40 ha.
- Towinock Indian Reserve No. 2, on Towinock Creek, just west of the Fraser River, 8 miles S of the town of Lillooet. 90.00 ha.

== See also ==
- St'at'imc
- St'at'imcets language
- Lillooet Tribal Council
- Lillooet, British Columbia
- Bridge River Power Project
