= Boston Bar First Nation =

Nlaka'pamux band government

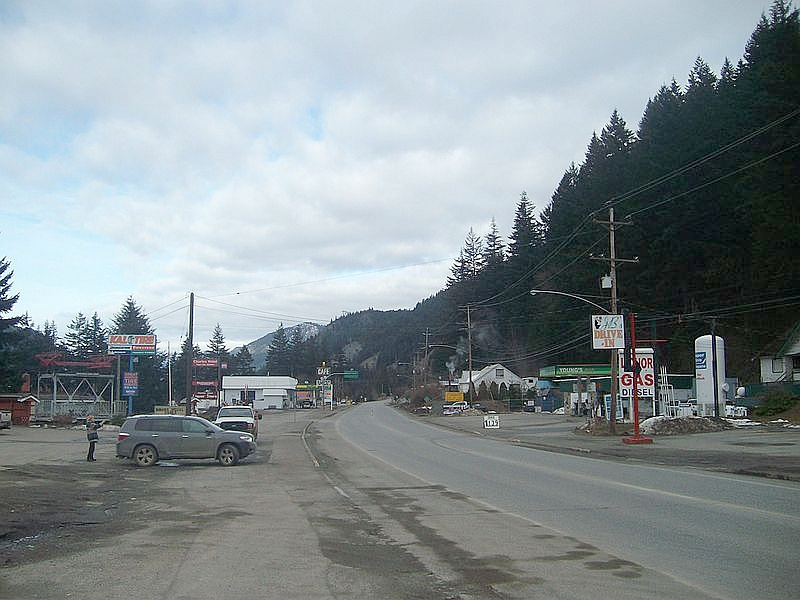
- Boston Bar along Highway #1
- Province: British Columbia

Land
- Main reserve: Boston Bar, British Columbia

Government
- Chief: Pamela O'Donaghey Robertson

Boston Bar First Nation (Thompson: Tqʷiyáwm or Tqʷyáwm) is a First Nations government in the Fraser Canyon region of the Southern Interior of the Canadian province of British Columbia. Located near the town of Boston Bar, it is a member of the Nlaka'pamux Nation Tribal Council.

Other Nlaka'pamux bands belong either to the Nicola Tribal Association or the Fraser Canyon Indian Administration.

== Chief and councillors ==
Chief Pamela O'DONAGHEY ROBERTSON

Term 07/18/2023 - 07/17/2025

Councillor Dawn ANGUS

Term 07/18/2023 - 07/17/2025

Councillor Debbie O'HANDLEY

Term 07/18/2023 - 07/17/2025

Councillor Diane THOMAS

Term 07/18/2023 - 07/17/2025

== See also ==
- Thompson language
