= Peters First Nation =

First Nations band in British Columbia, Canada

Agency overview
- Type: Band government
- Status: Active
- Headquarters: Canada
- Website: pfn3feathers.com

Peters First Nation or Peters Band (Halkomelem: Skwʼátets) is a First Nations band government of the Sto:lo people in the area of Hope, British Columbia.

Historically, the name of the First Nation in English was a transcription of the indigenous Halkomelem name (Skwʼátets). This was spelt as "Squatits Band". However, presumably due to the coincidental similarity in pronunciation to the ethnic and sexual slur "Squaw", this name has since been abandoned and is no longer used.

The Halkomelem name Skwʼátets literally means 'trickling water in the back'. The band was named after trickling water because trees grew on roots here above ground and water trickled under the trees in seasons when waterfalls were going.
