= Nooaitch Indian Band =

First Nations group in British Columbia, Canada

Nooaitch First Nation is a Nlakaʼpamux First Nations government in the Southern Interior region of British Columbia, Canada. It is a member of the Scwʼexmx Tribal Council.

The Nooaitch First Nation reserve community and offices are located in Merritt. The main urban centre is in the Nicola Country region between the Lower Mainland and Kamloops. It has a population of 235 people.

== Chief and Councillors ==
Chief Marcel Shackelly, Councillor Neil Shackelly, Councillor James Fountain.

== Economic Development ==
In 2007 the band signed a Forest and Range Opportunity Agreement with the Government of British Columbia that allowed the band to apply for a license to harvest 20,000 m^{3} of mountain pine beetle-infested timber annually over a 5-year period within the traditional territory of the Nooaitch Indian Band.

== Reserves ==
The band has jurisdiction over the following two reserves:

- Nooaitch Grass 9
- Nooaitch 10

== See also ==
- Nicola (chief)
- Scw'exmx
- Thompson language
