= Nicomen Indian Band =

Nlaka'pamux First Nations government

Nicomen First Nation (Thompson: Nqʼáwmn) is a Nlakaʼpamux First Nations government located near Lytton, British Columbia. It is a member of the Fraser Canyon Indian Administration as well as of the Scwʼexmx Tribal Council, which are two of three tribal councils of the Nlaka'pamux people. The third is the Nlakaʼpamux Nation Tribal Council.

The Nicomen First Nation reserve community and offices are located near Lytton in the lower Thompson Canyon.

== History ==
The Nicomen First Nation is located near the confluence of the Thompson and Nicoamen Rivers. It was in this area that the first major gold finds of what would become the Fraser Canyon Gold Rush were found, and the first quarrels between First Nations miners and American miners began, which would culminate in the Fraser Canyon War of the fall of 1858.

== Demographics ==
The total population of the citizens of the Band, as of 2001 was 89.

== Indian Reserves ==
Nicomen Indian Band has jurisdiction over the following reserves:

- Nicomen 1
- Kykinalko 2
- Sackum 3
- Gualada 3A
- Skhpowtz 4
- Klahkowit 5
- Sleetsis 6
- Shoskhost 7
- Unputpulquatum 8
- Skeikut 9
- Squianny 10
- Enhalt 11
- Skaynaneichst 12
- Naykikoulth 13
- Putkwa 14
- Shuouchten 15

== See also ==
- Thompson language
- Nlaka'pamux Nation Tribal Council
