= Bridge River Indian Band =

The Bridge River Indian Band (Lillooet: nx̌ʷístǝnǝmx) also known as the Nxwísten, the Xwisten, and the Bridge River Band, is a First Nations government located in the Central Interior-Fraser Canyon region of the Canadian province of British Columbia. It is a member of the Lillooet Tribal Council (also known as the St'at'imc Nation), which is the largest grouping of band governments of the St'at'imc people (aka the Lillooet people).

The Bridge River Indian Band's offices are located on BC Highway 40 in the lower Bridge River valley, a few miles outside of Lillooet, British Columbia, which is about 150 miles northeast of Vancouver, British Columbia, on the northern end of the town of Lillooet. Its residential areas are scattered through its reserve, one of the largest in British Columbia, with a newer residential subdivision adjacent to Highway 40 near the band offices, about 15 kilometres from Lillooet. It is one of the three main band communities of "metropolitan Lillooet", the others being the Cayoose Creek Indian Band (Sekwelwas First Nation) and the T'it'kt First Nation Lillooet Band), all of which border on the District of Lillooet.

== Bridge River Fishing Grounds ==
The important and age-old Bridge River Fishing Grounds, known as Sxetl in the St'at'imcets language and also known locally as Six Mile Rapids, are on the reserves of the Bridge River Band and their original "modern" post-Contact rancherie is on the bench above the fishing grounds, which are also known as the Lower Fountain or Lower Fountains and which lie at the junction of the Bridge and Fraser Rivers.

Other St'at'imc governments include the smaller In-SHUCK-ch Nation on the lower Lillooet River to the southwest, and the independent N'quatqua First Nation at the farther end of Anderson Lake from Seton Portage, which is the location of three of the reserve communities of the Seton Lake First Nation, another member of the Lillooet Tribal Council.

== Name ==
Nxwísten or Xwisten is the name of the Bridge River in the St'at'imcets language. Early documents and before formalized St'at'imcets spelling was defined various spellings were used Nxo'isten, Hoystein, and more recently 'Xwisten. The band's official website uses a variant of the proper St'at'imcets name Nxwísten in its domain name.

== History ==
The Bridge River Reserves are some of the largest by area in British Columbia, and date from the days of the chief of the Bridge River people's licensing and taxing of hydraulic miners on the Bridge River in the 1870s and 1880s. The reserves were set aside by Indian Reserve Commissioner Peter O'Reilly, who was appointed in 1880 by the provincial and federal governments. O'Reilly rushes his work and failed to reserve lands that the Xwisten people had requested, and did not comply with later instructions to return to Bridge River to complete the reserve-creation process. The mining activity, which washed away at the river's steep, sandy banks with huge hoses and scoured the riverbed, hurt the salmon runs in the river, and these were further damaged and virtually wiped out by the construction of the Bridge River Power Project in the 1940s and 1950s.

The Xwisten people are one of the three reserve communities which directly surrounding Lillooet and many of their community have had an important role in the history of the native political movements in BC.

== Chief and Councillors ==
Chief Susan James 11/2015–Present

Chief Billy Michelle 1969-1989

== Indian Reserves ==
Indian Reserves under the administration of the Bridge River Band are:

- Bridge River Indian Reserve No. 1 - on both sides of the Bridge River upstream from the confluence to Antoine Creek, c. 14 miles, 3845.50 ha.
- Bridge River Indian Reserve No. 2 - on the right (west) bank of the Fraser River about 4 miles upstream/north of Fountain, 56.70 ha.
- Lillooet Indian Reserve No. 1A - on the right (west) bank of the Fraser River one mile northwest of the town of Lillooet, 797.20 ha. (this reserve is shared with the T'it'q'et First Nation (Lillooet Band)

== See also ==
- St'at'imcets language
- Bridge River Power Project
