= Nuu-chah-nulth Tribal Council =

Tribal council in British Columbia, Canada

The Nuu-chah-nulth Tribal Council is a First Nations Tribal Council in the Canadian province of British Columbia, located on the west coast of Vancouver Island. The organization is based in Port Alberni, British Columbia.

== History ==
The different Nuu-chah-nulth tribes share many aspects of their language and cultural traditions.

Nuu-chah-nulth peoples founded an organization called the West Coast Allied Tribes in 1958. In 1973, they incorporated a non-profit society called the West Coast District Society of Indian Chiefs, also known as the West Coast District Council. That organization changed its named to the Nuu-chah-nulth Tribal Council in 1979.

== Member First Nations ==
=== Southern region ===
- Ditidaht First Nation (Niitiinaʔatḥ)
- Huu-ay-aht First Nation (Huuʕiiʔatḥ)
- Hupacasath First Nation (Huupač̓asʔatḥ)
- Tseshaht First Nation (C̓išaaʔatḥ)
- Uchucklesaht First Nation (Ḥuučuqƛisʔatḥ)

=== Central region ===
- Ahousaht First Nation (ʕaaḥuusʔatḥ)
- Hesquiaht First Nation (Ḥiškʷiiʔatḥ)
- Tla-o-qui-aht First Nations (ƛaʔuukʷiʔatḥ)
- Toquaht First Nation (T̓uk̓ʷaaʔatḥ)
- Yuułuʔiłʔatḥ (Ucluelet First Nation)

=== Northern region ===
- Ehattesaht First Nation (ʔiiḥatisʔatḥ)
- Kyuquot/Cheklesahht First Nation(Qaay̓uuk̓ʷatḥ/Č̓iiqƛisʔstḥ)
- Mowachaht/Muchalaht First Nations (Muwačʔatḥ/Mačłaʔatḥ)
- Nuchatlaht First Nation (Nučaaƛʔatḥ)

Note: The Pacheedaht First Nation (P̓aačiinaʔatḥ), though Nuu-chah-nulth by culture and language, is not a member of the Nuu-chah-nulth Tribal Council. Similarly the closely related Ditidaht of the Ditidaht First Nation and the Makah (Qʷiniščiʔatḥ) of the other side of the Strait of Juan de Fuca are not members of the Nuu-chah-nulth Tribal Council.

== Roles and Responsibilities ==
The NTC represents its member nations and provides a variety of programs and services to them. It can coordinate projects, particularly on issues that overlap jurisdictions and take advantage of economies of scale or cross-regional planning opportunities. As well, it can act as a sounding board and coordinator on many issues of common concern.

The NTC operates many programs that help further the well-being of the communities within their sphere of influence, including in the following areas:

- Child Welfare
- Fisheries
- Economic Development
- Membership
- Education & Training
- Financial Administrative Support
- Employment & Training
- Infrastructure Development
- Health
- Newspaper (Ha-Shilth-Sa)
- Social Development
- Mental health (Teechuktl)

The NTC provides programs and services to approximately 8,000 registered members, of which about 2,000 live off reserve (NTC, 2008a). The Central Region is by far the largest component of the NTC at the present time. Some programs (e.g. child welfare, fisheries, and training) are administered directly by NTC staff on behalf of the bands.

The NTC uses programs/services funding formula where each nation receives one portion of its funding based on its population size and one portion based on program application. New funding agreements are negotiated annually to account for newly negotiated treaties and the capacities within individual nations. As a result, emphasis is moving away from centralized programs towards band-managed programs.

== Structure and Administration ==
The Nuu-chah-nulth Tribal Council draws on the resources of fourteen tribes to provide staff and expertise. Not all staff, however, are members of its member nations. The NTC is presided over by a president, vice-president and an executive director. To ensure all areas have access to the administrative body, staff positions are organized to ensure staff coverage for all regions. These include office managers for the Southern and Central Region and Northern Region, secretaries, receptionists and a file clerk. The NTC Board of Directors is composed of the elected Chiefs from each Nation.

== See also ==
- Pacheedaht First Nation
- Makah
- Nuu-chah-nulth Economic Development Corporation
- Nuu-chah-nulth Employment and Training Program
- List of tribal councils in British Columbia
