= Whispering Pines/Clinton Indian Band =

Member of the Secwepemc Nation

The Whispering Pines/Clinton Indian Band, also called the Pellt'iq't First Nation is a member of the Secwepemc (Shuswap) Nation, located in the Central Interior region of the Canadian province of British Columbia. Its main Indian reserve is located at Clinton, British Columbia. It was created when the government of the then-Colony of British Columbia established an Indian reserve system in the 1860s. It is a member government of the Shuswap Nation Tribal Council.

== Indian Reserves ==
The following Indian Reserves are under the administration of the Whispering Pines/Clinton Indian Band:

- Clinton Indian Reserve No. 1
- Clinton Indian Reserve No. 2
- Clinton Indian Reserve No. 2A
- Kelly Creek Indian Reserve No. 3, on left bank of the Fraser River one mile N. of the mouth of Kelly Creek, 1.40 ha. 50°58′00″N 121°53′00″W
- Whispering Pines Indian Reserve No. 4, W side of the North Thompson River, N of Heffley Creek, 494.40 ha. 50°59′30″N 120°14′25″W
