= Takla Lake First Nation =

Dakelh band government in British Columbia, Canada

Takla Nation
- Band No. 608
- People: Dakelh
- Headquarters: Prince George
- Province: British Columbia

Land
- Main reserve: North Tacla Lake 7
- Reserves: List: Beak Lake 1A, 1B, 4; Bear River 3; Cheztainya Lake 11; Driftwood River 1; Klewaduska 6; Kotsine 2; North Tacla Lake 7A, 8, 10, 11A, 12; Tacla Lake 9; Tsaytut Island 1C; Tsupmeet 5
- Land area: 8.09 km^{2} (3.12 sq mi)

Population (2025)
- On reserve: 208
- On other land: 20
- Off reserve: 790
- Total population: 1018

Government
- Chief: John Alan French
- Council: 2023-2027: Wilma Abraham; Ernie French-Downey; Anita William; Colin Jacob Teegee

Tribal Council
- Carrier Sekani Tribal Council

Website
- www.taklafn.ca

Takla Nation is a First Nation located around Takla Lake, 400 km north of Prince George, British Columbia, Canada. The main community is at Takla Landing, at the north end of Takla Lake, but the band services 17 reserves totaling 809 hectares. Takla Lake First Nation has approximately 950 members. It was created by the amalgamation of the Takla Lake and Fort Connelly bands in 1959.

== Facilities ==
The community is also home to the Nuswadeezulh Community School, offering Kindergarten to Grade 10, as well as adult education and alternate education classes. Nuswadeezulh means "Looking into the Future".

A Royal Canadian Mounted Police detachment was established by agreement with Takla First Nation and opened in October 1999. The detachment has two designated native police officers and one corporal non-commissioned officer in charge.

Takla Lake is accessible by an unpaved forestry road that branches off the Tache Road about 5 km short of the village of Tache. Access was formerly only by boat or float plane (see Takla Landing Water Aerodrome). Postal service is available at Takla Lake with mail pick-up and delivery once per week. Electricity has been provided since 1985. Previously, only the school, health station and band office had electricity provided by diesel generators. Telephone and internet service has switched from residential Telus lines to satellite service.

== Governance and language ==
Takla Lake First Nation has one chief and four councilors, all elected at large by the community.

The Takla Lake people speak predominantly English and the Babine dialect of Babine-Witsuwit'en, locally referred to as "Carrier". Formerly many people also spoke Sekani, and some spoke Gitksan. Some people also speak the Stuart Lake dialect of Carrier. The overall identification of the community is as Carrier.
