= Gitanyow First Nation =

Gitxsan band government in British Columbia, Canada

Gitanyow
- Band No. 537
- Logo of the Gitanyow Hereditary Chiefs
- People: Gitxsan
- Headquarters: Kitwanga
- Province: British Columbia

Land
- Main reserve: Gitanyow 1
- Reserve: Gitanyow 2, 3A
- Land area: 8.5 km^{2} (3.3 sq mi)

Population (2025)
- On reserve: 355
- On other land: 32
- Off reserve: 476
- Total population: 863

Government
- Chief: Jacqueline Smith
- Council: 2023-2025: Jason Derrick; Sidney Derrick; Georgette Good; Tyrone Hill; Andy Johnson Jr.; Lesley Mclean; Ben Russell; Jennifer Shirey

Tribal Council
- Gitksan Local Government Services Society

Website
- www.gitanyowchiefs.com

The Gitanyow First Nation (formerly Kitwancool) is a First Nation band government located on the Kitwanga River, in northwestern British Columbia, Canada. They are one of seven band governments for the Gitxsan people, though function independently from other Gitxsan governments.

As of 2025, they have over 860 registered members, though less than a third live on reserve. They have three reserves, which total 850.40 hectares (8.5040 km^{2}).

== Treaty Process ==
They are in Stage 4 of the BC Treaty Process.

== Demographics ==
As of March 2025, Gitanyow First Nation has 863 registered members. Of those members, 355 live on reserve, and 508 live off-reserve.
