= Nuchatlaht First Nation =

Nuu-chah-nulth band government in British Columbia, Canada

Nuchatlaht
- Band No. 639
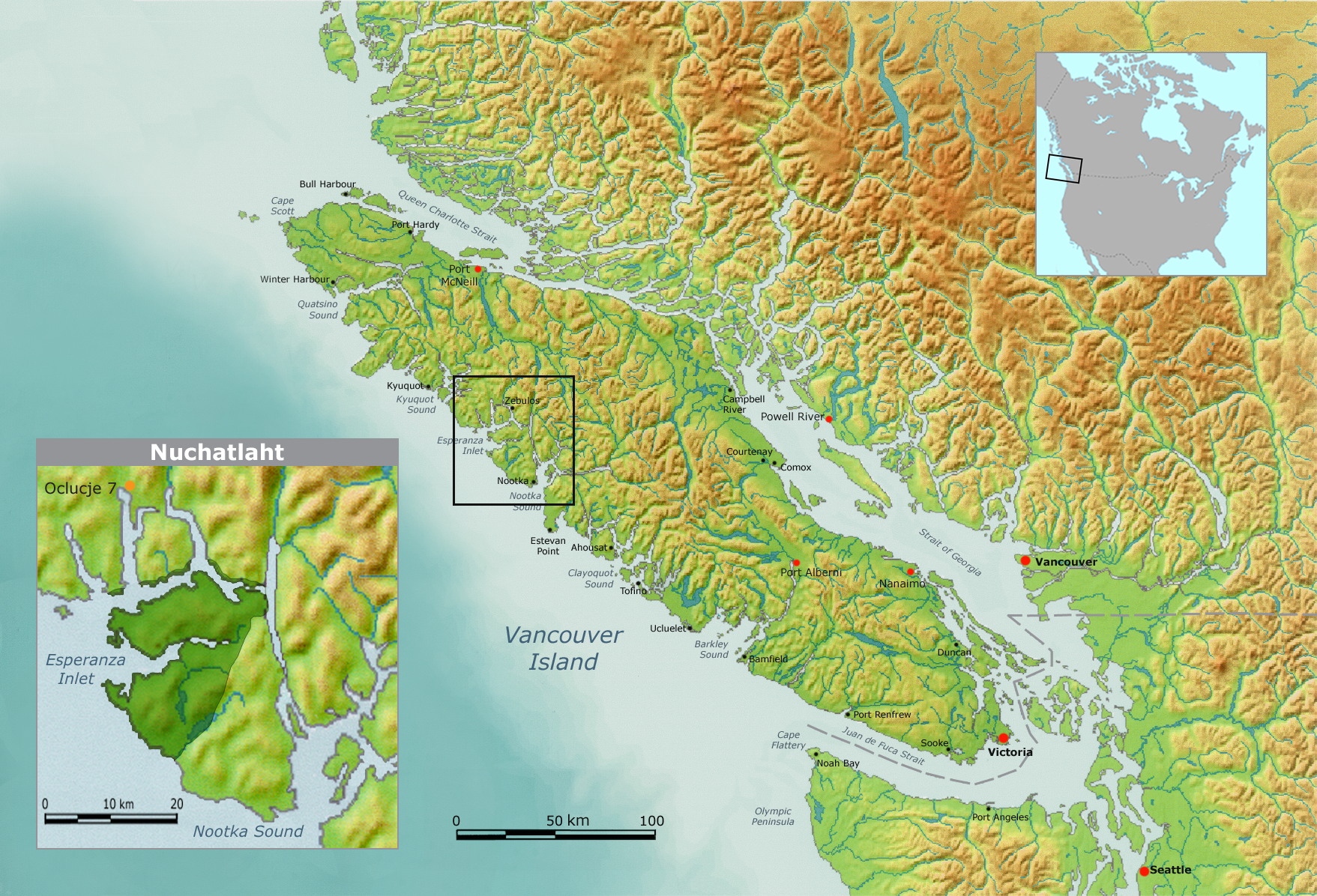
- Traditional territory of the Nuchatlaht First Nation
- People: Nuu-chah-nulth
- Headquarters: Oclucje
- Province: British Columbia

Land
- Main reserve: Oclucje 7
- Reserves: List: Ahpukto 3; Chiseuquis 9; Nuchatl 1, 2; Occosh 8; Opemit 4; Owossitsa 6; Savey 15; Shoomart 5; Sophe 14
- Land area: 0.92 km^{2} (0.36 sq mi)

Population (2025)
- On reserve: 22
- On other land: 10
- Off reserve: 135
- Total population: 167

Government
- Chief: Jordan Michael
- Council: Archie Little; Erick Michael; Robert John; Mellissa Michael

Tribal Council
- Nuu-chah-nulth Tribal Council

Website
- www.nuchatlaht.com

Nuchatlaht First Nation is a band government for the Nuu-chah-nulth First Nations government based at the head of Espinosa Inlet on the west coast of Vancouver Island in British Columbia, Canada. It is a member of the Nuu-chah-nulth Tribal Council. It has 11 reserves, with a total land area of 92.20 hectares (227.8 acres). As of March 2025, it has 167 registered band members, with 22 living on reserve.

== See also ==
- Nuu-chah-nulth
- Nuu-chah-nulth language
