= Hupacasath First Nation =

- Band No. 664
- Hupačasath
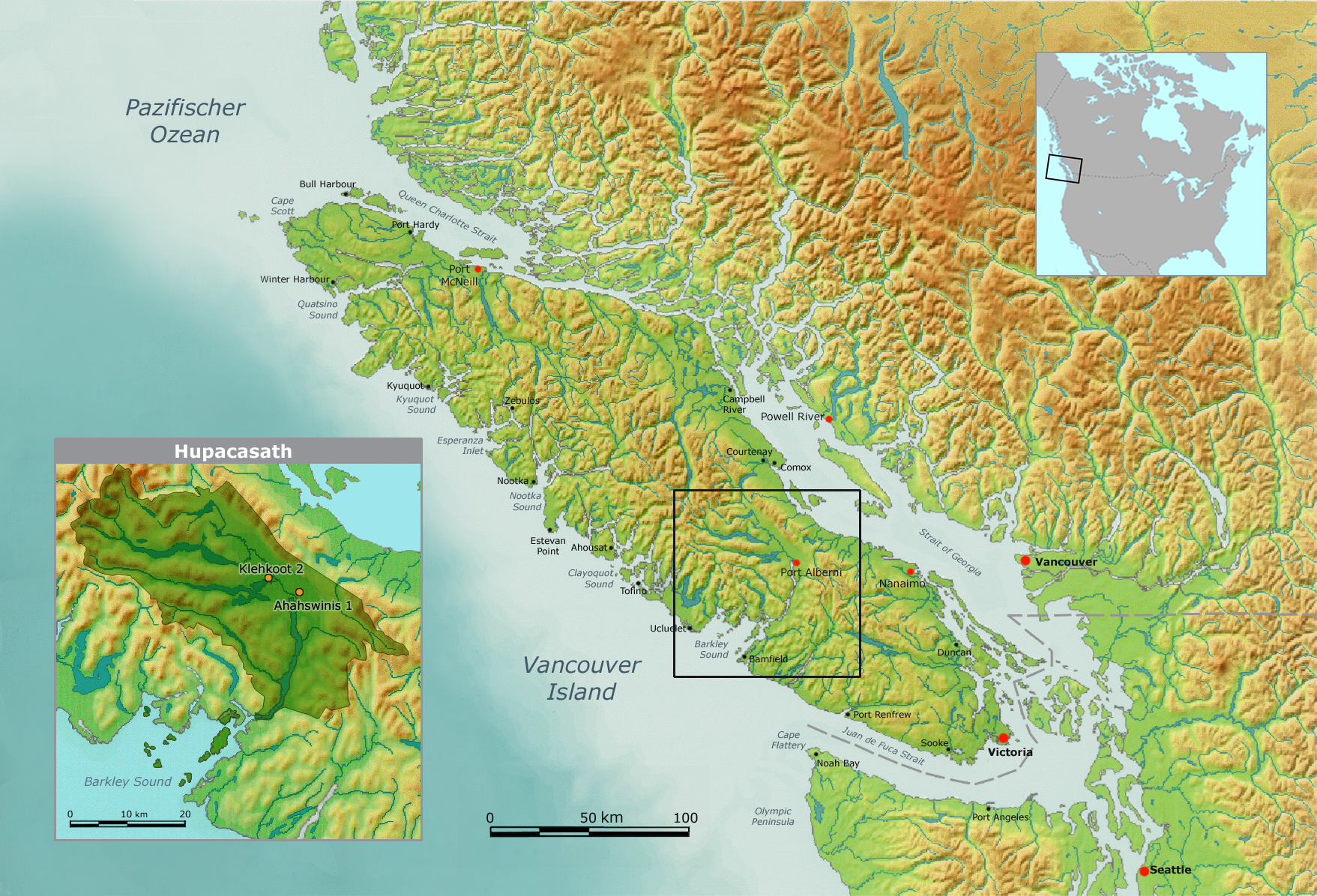
- People: Nuu-chah-nulth
- Headquarters: Port Alberni
- Province: British Columbia

Land
- Main reserve: Ahahswinis 1
- Reserves: Chuchakacook 4; Cous 3; Klehcoot 2; Nettle Island 5
- Land area: 2.191 km^{2} (0.846 sq mi)

Population (2025)
- On reserve: 134
- On other land: 22
- Off reserve: 221
- Total population: 377

Government
- Chief: Brandy Lauder
- Council: Serena Read; Leah Wrigley; Cameron Tatoosh

Tribal Council
- Nuu-chah-nulth Tribal Council

Website
- www.hupacasath.ca

The Hupacasath First Nation (styled Hupačasath or Ḥupač̓asatḥ) is a First Nations government based in the Alberni Valley on the west coast of Vancouver Island in British Columbia, Canada with approximately 232,000-hectares of territory and approximately 300 members across five reserves. It is a member of the Nuu-chah-nulth Tribal Council. An alternate spelling of Hupacasath is Opetchesaht or Opitchesaht.

In September 2012, the Government of Canada signed the Canada-China Promotion and Reciprocal Protection of Investments Agreement (also known as Canada China FIPA) with The People's Republic of China giving them control over major assets such as coal on its territory. It comes into effect when it has been ratified by both sides. The Hupacasath First Nations "community argued in federal court in June that the federal government is required to consult First Nations under Section 35 of the Constitution Act, which provides constitutional protection to the aboriginal and treaty rights of aboriginal peoples in Canada."

For thousands of years the Hupacasath people have occupied their traditional territory on Central Vancouver Island (See Traditional Territory Map). The Hupacasath are three distinct tribes: the Muh-uulth-aht, Kleh-koot-aht and Cuu-ma-as-aht (Ahahswinis).

The Muh-uulth-aht people (means people from where there is mountain with the face burnt off) lived in the Great Central Lake area with villages located at the head of Great Central Lake and around the Beaver Creek area of Stamp Falls. Their chief was named Kanaawis (Kanowish) who was a great warrior in his time. This area was and still is a great place for hunting deer, elk fowl, etc. as well for fishing and food gathering activities.

The Cuu-ma-as-ath people lived at Ahahswinis (means cleared in the middle), which was in the general vicinity of where the Port Alberni City is located now, to the Coleman Creek area down the Alberni Canal. Their village was where the current settlement is now located, on the Somass River. Salmon fishing, hunting, gathering, and potlatching were important activities carried out by the people in their traditional territory.

The Kleh-koot-aht people resided around Kleh-koot (Sproat Lake) (means long stretch of level land). Kleh-koot-aht's area was between Yaaqis (Prairie Farm) and Sproat Falls and there was a seasonal village located on the Sproat River. This village was a place for fishing and smoking salmon, picking blackberries, and hunting deer. There was a longhouse here where they performed potlatches in the winter season.

The Cuu-ma-as, Klehkoot and Muhuulaht people decided to amalgamate prior to the Europeans' arrival. This decision was made because each of the tribes were at war with the Coast Salish people and they thought that joining the three tribes would make them stronger in their war against the Salish.

After the amalgamation, the three tribes decided that they were to be called the Hupacasath. The strongest warrior, Kanaawis, was chosen as grand chief.

The Hupacasath people exercise their aboriginal rights (self-determination in governance, land, resources and culture) in their traditional territory. Use of the territory is governed by the seasons. Hupacasath follow the migratory patterns of the deer and seasonal runs of the salmon.

== Traditional Territory ==
The Hupacasath First Nation's traditional territory is large compared to other Nuu-chah-nulth First Nations. The territory is approximately 229,000 hectares, which engulfs the whole Alberni Valley. The boundaries for this territory are the mountain peaks from the Alberni Valley, which start from the north at Mt. Chief Frank, from the south at 5040 Peak and Hannah Mountain, from the east at Mt. Arrowsmith and Mt Spencer, and from the west from Big Interior Mountain. This territory contains some of the most valuable forest, fish and marine resources in the world. The winds formed by the warm offshore currents of the Pacific Ocean create a tepid maritime climate with a summer dry period. This creates vast forests of western red cedar, yellow cedar, douglas fir, hemlock and balsam. The lakes and rivers contain all five species of Pacific Salmon as well as Steelhead and Trout.

within the Hupacasath territory there are five reserves. Ahahswinis (Reserve #1) is located on the north side of the Somass River in Port Alberni. This is the main village of the Hupacasath tribe. In the past the people here conducted activities such as hunting, fishing, potlatching, berry and fruit picking. Currently this reserve is home to the majority of the Hupacasath people. Some of the people conduct the same activities as their ancestors in this place.

Kleekoot (Reserve #2) is situated on the Stamp and Sproat Rivers just west of Sproat Lake. In the past, this place was used for mainly fishing purposes such as spearing fish, trapping fish in weirs, and preparing fish. Other activities done on this reserve were hunting, potlatching and berry picking. Today this place is home to a few Hupacasath Band members who continue fishing and hunting in the area.

The third Hupacasath reserve in the territory is Cous (Reserve # 3). It is located on the west side of the Alberni Inlet adjacent to Lone Tree Point. There used to be a nice seasonal settlement at this place but it is now bare. This is a result of a death of a chief at this place. Chief Dan Watts died accidentally one day at Cous and after his death everyone left this place. This reserve was used for hunting and fishing purposes primarily. Today there is no one living there but people still go there to do activities such as picnicking, fishing and hunting.

Chu-ca-ca-cook (Reserve # 4) is the smallest Hupacasath reserve. It is located on the west side of the Alberni Inlet just north of Nahmint Bay. This place used to be a fishing site and stop over spot for the Hupacasath people. In recent years however, there has been very little activity or inhabitance there.

Lastly, there is Nettle Island (Reserve # 5). This reserve is outside the Hupacasath territory in the Broken Group Islands in Barkley Sound. This property was purchased from Arthur Maynard in the early 1900s. It was purchased because the Hupacasath people traveled down the inlet to Barkley Sound frequently to conduct business with other First Nations (i.e. trade and barter), to visit relatives, and to attend potlatches held in the area. Today Nettle Island is used for camping and seafood gathering. In addition, it is now part of the Pacific Rim National Park. Therefore, tourists from all over the world now travel to and around Nettle Island to partake in activities such as camping, fishing and kayaking.

Medicines were collected throughout these areas at the appropriate times of year. It is also important to note that there were caretakers for each area or resource, to ensure that nobody abused the land and resources. This care for the territory was practiced year round. Prior to amalgamation, each chief of the three groups had their own people to care for the resources within their ha-houlthe. After amalgamation both the use of and care for the territory was shared
