= Hesquiaht First Nation =

Nuu-chah-nulth band government in British Columbia, Canada

Hesquiaht
- Band No. 661
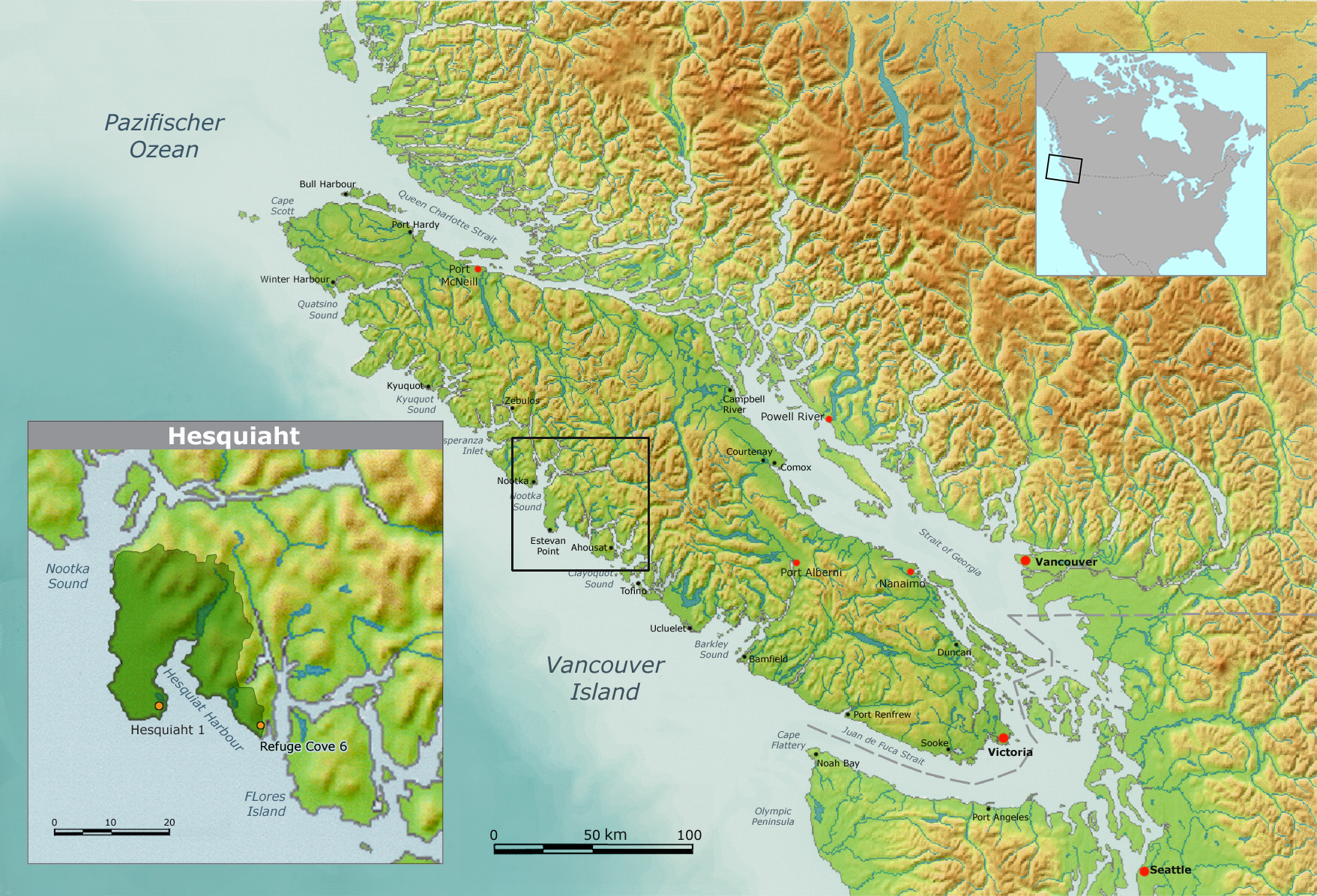
- People: Nuu-chah-nulth
- Headquarters: Hot Springs Cove
- Province: British Columbia

Land
- Main reserve: Refuge Cove 6
- Reserves: Hesquiat 6; Homais 2; Maahpe 4; Teahmit 3
- Land area: 3.21 km^{2} (1.24 sq mi)

Population (2025)
- On reserve: 116
- On other land: 31
- Off reserve: 606
- Total population: 753

Government
- Chief: Mariah Charleson

Tribal Council
- Nuu-chah-nulth Tribal Council

Website
- www.hesquiaht.ca

Hesquiaht First Nation is a band government of the Nuu-chah-nulth First Nation, located at Hot Springs Cove on west coast of Vancouver Island, British Columbia Canada. Approximately 100 people live in Hot Springs Cove, with a commute of over one hour by boat into Tofino. The Hot Springs Cove reserve is located on territory claimed by the Ahousaht First Nation.

== History ==
The community had to rebuild after the tsunami of March 28, 1964. The tsunami heavily damaged the village and forced many people to move away.

The Hesquiaht were affected by the 1990s economic collapse of their traditional fishery and forestry activities.

== Governance ==
The Ha’wiih system functions in Hesquiaht. Four hereditary chiefs guide the community and inform the work of council. The chiefs sit hierarchically, matching the four fingers of the hand. The Ha'wiih are:

- Kathleen Andrews-Thomas - Ta'hii (Head Hereditary Chief) (Middle finger), House of Kaaeth Klaahish Takuumth (includes the Charleson, Ignace and Mickey families)
- Vince Ambrose (ring finger) (Ambrose, Lucas families)
- Steve Tom (index finger) (Tom, Sabbas, Webster families)
- Eddie Jones (small finger) (Jones, Lucas and Ginger families)

Klukwana (the traditional governance system) includes the continued existence of Tikawiilth, those who manage the nation's affairs on behalf of the hereditary chiefs. The Tikawiilth traditionally manage the affairs of the hereditary chiefs, which in modern times often coincides with the role of Chief and Council. The current Tikawiilth are Pat Charleson (Head Wolf Chief) - (thumb), Larry Paul, Remi Charleson, Eugene August and Chancellor Amos.

=== Council ===
Hesquiaht Council is elected every four years. Chief and Council meet monthly, and a joint Chief and Council, membership, and the Hereditary Chiefs meeting is held yearly. The Chief and Council are responsible for management of band affairs. The Chief and Council and their portfolios include:

- Mariah Charleson, Chief Councillor:
- April Charleson, Councillor:
- Constant Charleson, Councillor:
- Linus Lucas Jr., Councillor:
- Joy Charleson, Councillor:
- Preston Campbell, Councillor:
- Kayla Lucas, Councillor

The Hesquiaht Chief and Council rely on administrators to conduct the day-to-day management of tribal affairs, program delivery, and coordination with government agencies.

== Economic development ==
Fisheries are an important source of employment. The Nation operated a boat building yard.

The Hesquiaht are an isolated community in the Clayoquot region. Sustainable transportation, community infrastructure, sustainable energy production and keeping or re-attracting members to the community are issues affecting their future.

Hesquiaht are working on developing community resources. This includes eco-tourism, infrastructure and housing, treaty negotiations, and the marketing of the community and territory.
