= Upper Nicola Band =

First Nation government in British Columbia, Canada

The Upper Nicola Band (Okanagan: Spax̌mn̓, also spelt as Spaxomin) is a First Nations band government in the Canadian province of British Columbia, located near the town of Merritt in the Nicola Country at Douglas Lake. They are a member of both the Okanagan Nation Alliance and the Scw’exmx Tribal Council, which is a joint government of Okanagan and Nlaka'pamux bands.

== Indian Reserves ==
Indian Reserves under the administration of the band are:

- Nicola Lake 1, 2,699,10 Acres
- Hamilton Creek 2, 60 Acres
- Douglas Lake 3, 23,047.50 Acres
- Spahomin Creek 4, 32- Acres
- Chapperon Lake 5, 725.00 Acres
- Chapperon Creek 6, 15.1 Acres
- Salmon Lake 7, 172.00 Acres
- Spahomin Creek 8, 3,857.30 Acres
- Hihium Lake 6 (Shared between Upper Nicola, Lower Nicola, Bonaparte, and Tk’emlúps te Secwépemc Bands), 78 Acres

== Nsyilxcn Talking Dictionary Project ==
=== Nsyilxcn Language Resource Development ===
A group of dedicated individuals are working on the development of an nsyilxcn talking dictionary. This is a unique project that originates from the recordings of Upper Nicola Band Member, Joe Michel, and documented by linguist Yvonne Hébert. This project aims to provide a learning resource of the nsyilxcn language. Further information can found in the references link.
