= Skuppah Indian Band =

First Nation in British Columbia, Canada

Skuppah Indian Band (Thompson: Sképeʔ) is a First Nations band government located near Lytton, British Columbia. Skuppah is one of the 16 Nlaka'pamux communities and a member of the Nlaka'pamux Nation Tribal Council.

== See also ==
- Thompson language
