= Cayoose Creek First Nation =

First nation government in Canada

The Cayoose Creek First Nation (Lillooet: sǝk̓ʷǝl̓wásmǝx) also known as the Cayoose Creek Indian Band, the Cayoose Creek Band, and the Sekw'el'wás First Nation, is a First Nations government in the Central Interior-Fraser Canyon region of the Canadian province of British Columbia. The Cayoose Creek First Nation is a member government of the Lillooet Tribal Council, also known officially as the St'at'imc Nation (though without including all St'at'imc communities).

The Cayoose Creek First Nation's offices are located at Lillooet, British Columbia.

== See also ==
- St'at'imcets language
- Bridge River Power Project
