= Nlakaʼpamux Nation Tribal Council =

Canadian First Nations council

The Nlaka'pamux Nation Tribal Council, formerly the Fraser Thompson Indian Services Society, is a First Nations government tribal council comprising bands in the Fraser Canyon and Thompson Canyon areas of the Canadian province of British Columbia. It is one of three tribal councils of the Nlaka'pamux people, the others being the Nicola Tribal Association and the Fraser Canyon Indian Administration.

Chief Matt Pasco is the tribal chair of the NPTC, having been selected in 2020. Pasco is the son of Grand Chief Bob Pasco who had held the position for almost 40 years.

== Member Bands ==
- Boothroyd First Nation (Boston Bar)
- Oregon Jack Creek Band (near Ashcroft)
- Lytton First Nation
- Skuppah Indian Band

== Non-Affiliated Bands ==
- Ashcroft First Nation
- Boston Bar First Nation
- Spuzzum First Nation (also a member of the Fraser Canyon Indian Administration)

== See also ==
- Thompson language
- List of tribal councils in British Columbia
