= Fraser Canyon Indian Administration =

First Nations tribal council

The Fraser Canyon Indian Administration was a First Nations tribal council government composed of five bands in the Fraser Canyon and Thompson Canyon areas of the Canadian province of British Columbia.

The Fraser Canyon Indian Administration closed when it disbanded in 2004.

== Member bands ==
- Kanaka Bar Indian Band
- Skuppah First Nation (near Lytton)
- Spuzzum First Nation
- Nicomen Indian Band (also a member of the Scw’exmx Tribal Council)

== See also ==
- Nlaka'pamux
- Thompson language
- Nlaka'pamux Nation Tribal Council
- Nicola Tribal Association
- Fraser Canyon War
- List of tribal councils in British Columbia
