= Scwʼexmx Tribal Council =

The Scwʼexmx Tribal Council, officially referred to until May 27, 2019, as Nicola Tribal Association, also known as the Nicola Tribal Council and the Nicola Valley Tribal Council, is an official First Nations tribal council composed of bands in the Nicola Valley, Thompson Canyon and Fraser Canyon areas of the Canadian province of British Columbia. It is one of three tribal councils of the Nlakaʼpamux (Thompson) people, the other two being the Nlakaʼpamux Nation Tribal Council and the Fraser Canyon Indian Administration. The Lytton First Nation and Lower Nicola Indian Band community, does not belong to any of the three Tribal Councils.

In 2009 Indian & Northern Affairs Canada (INAC) announced cutbacks, to result in making Tribal Councils obsolete and discontinued as service agencies to First Nations or Band organizations. Funding allocations had been lowered annually for some time. Indian & Northern Affairs Canada believed that Tribal Councils were not meeting service obligations under the law. The department proposed streamlining the Tribal Council funding to send it directly to First Nations, the Métis, and Urban First Nation population centers. As of 2009 Indian & Northern Affairs Canada was revamping the Governance portion to fund Band Offices, Tribal Councils, and certain Non-profit First Nation organizations.

== Member Bands ==
- Upper Nicola First Nation (Douglas Lake) - also a member of the Okanagan Nation Alliance
- Coldwater First Nation (Merritt)
- Nooaitch First Nation (Merritt)
- Sxeʼxnʼx (Shackan) First Nation, (42 km West of Village of Merritt)

== See also ==
- Nlakaʼpamux Nation Tribal Council
- Fraser Canyon Indian Administration (tribal council)
- Lower Nicola Indian Band (Band)(http://www.lnib.net/)
