= Thompson language =

Interior Salishan language

Thompson
- Thompson River Salish
- nɬeʔkepmxcín
- Native to: Canada, United States
- Region: British Columbia, Washington
- Ethnicity: 3,105 Nlakaʼpamux
- Native speakers: 230 (2021 census)
- Language family: Salishan: Interior Salish; Northern; Thompson
- Writing system: Duployan shorthand (historical); Latin (current)

Language codes
- ISO 639-3: thp
- Glottolog: thom1243
- ELP: Nłeʔkepmxcín (Thompson)

- Thompson is classified as Severely Endangered by the UNESCO Atlas of the World's Languages in Danger.

Thompson (endonym: nɬeʔkepmxcín) – also known as Nlakaʼpamuctsin, Nlakaʼpamux, or Nthlakampx – is an Interior Salishan language spoken by the Nlakaʼpamux people (also known as the Thompson people). It is spoken in the Fraser Canyon, Thompson Canyon, and Nicola Country of the Canadian province of British Columbia and was formerly spoken in the North Cascades region of Whatcom and Chelan counties of Washington State in the United States. A dialect distinctive to the Nicola Valley is called Scwʼexmx, which is the name of the subgroup of the Nlakaʼpamux who live there.

== Phonology ==
Thompson is a consonant-heavy language. The consonants can be divided into two subgroups: obstruents (oral occlusives & voiceless continuants), which restrict airflow, and sonorants (nasal occlusives & voiced and glottalic continuants), which do not. The sonorants are often syllabic consonants, which can form syllables on their own without vowels.

=== Consonants ===
			Bilabial	Alveolar			Palatal (-alveolar)	Velar		Uvular/ Pharyngeal		Glottal
			Bilabial	plain	sib.	lat.	Palatal (-alveolar)	plain	lab.	plain	lab.	Glottal
Occlusive	nasal	plain	m	n								
Occlusive	nasal	glottalic	ˀm	ˀn								
Occlusive	oral	tenuis	p	t	ts		tʃ	k	kʷ	q	qʷ	
Occlusive	oral	ejective	pʼ	tʼ	tsʼ	tɬʼ		kʼ	kʷʼ	qʼ	qʷʼ	ʔ
Continuant	voiceless				s	ɬ	ʃ	x	xʷ	χ	χʷ	h
Continuant	voiced				z	l	j		w	ʕ	ʕʷ	
Continuant	glottalic				ˀz	ˀl	ˀj		ˀw	ˀʕ	ˀʕʷ	

=== Vowels ===
	Front		Central		Back
	nor.	ret.	nor.	ret.	Back
Close	i ~ i̠				u
Mid	e		ə ~ ə̠		o
Open			a		

Stress is transcribed with an acute accent, such as ⟨á⟩.

== Writing systems ==
nɬeʔképmxcin consonant chart
p̓	(t̓)	ƛ̓	c̓	c̓	k̓	k̓ʷ	q̓	q̓ʷ	ʔ
p	t	ɬ	c̣	c	k	kʷ	q	qʷ	ʔ
		ɬ	ṣ	s	x	xʷ	x̣	x̣ʷ	h
m	n	l	z	y	ɣ	w	ʕ	ʕʷ	
m̓	n̓	l̓	z̓	y̓	ɣ̓	w̓	ʕ̓	ʕ̓ʷ	

One of the writing systems used for Thompson uses the North American Phonetic Alphabet (NAPA) writing system.

The above consonant chart is based on the one found in "The Thompson Language" by Laurence C. Thompson & M. Terry Thompson.

== Morphology and syntax ==
Researchers working in the Generative tradition have speculated that Salishan languages lack lexical categories such as nouns and verbs. Evidence for such an absence of contrast between parts of speech in Thompson come from a lack of clear morphological markers (e.g., morphemes) that differentiate nouns and verbs. Instead, generative linguists discuss morphology and syntax in Salishan based on a framework of predicates and particles. However, more contemporary work suggests a changing understanding of Salishan grammar. Some Salishanists believe that functional categories are not prescriptive of lexical categories. Work in Functional linguistics suggests that other factors beyond morphological evidence code lexical categories in languages. In Salishan, the distinction would be less overt than in some other languages.

=== Lexical suffixes ===
One morphological feature of Thompson is lexical suffixes. These are words that add nuance to predicates and can be affixed to the ends of root words to add their general meaning to that word. Thompson and Thompson assert that as a result of English language influence, speakers are using these more complex predicates less and less in favor of simpler predicates with complements and adjuncts, resulting in “a general decline in the exploitation of the rich synthetic resources of the language.”

Suffix	Suffix meaning	Root	Root meaning	Suffixed form	
꞊uyəm’x^{w}	earth, land, place; in vicinity; (earth) oven; baked goods	/q’íx̣-t	strong, secure	/q’íx̣꞊ym’x^{w}	firm, hard ground
꞊uyəm’x^{w}	earth, land, place; in vicinity; (earth) oven; baked goods	√c’əɬ	cold	/c’ɬ꞊úym’x^{w}	it is a cold country
꞊uyəm’x^{w}	earth, land, place; in vicinity; (earth) oven; baked goods	k^{w}[ʔá]l’	turn green	/k^{w}a[ʔ]l’꞊úym’x^{w}	the grass turns green
꞊uyəm’x^{w}	earth, land, place; in vicinity; (earth) oven; baked goods	√c’áp	ferment	n/c’áp꞊ym’x^{w}	sour-dough, yeast bread
꞊ekst	hand, arm	√kiyèʔ	ahead, in front, principal, the eldest	s/kiyèʔ꞊qínʼ꞊kst	thumb
꞊qin	head	√kiyèʔ	ahead, in front, principal, the eldest		thumb
꞊xn	foot, leg	√kiyèʔ	ahead, in front, principal, the eldest	s/kiyèʔ꞊qínʼ꞊xn	big toe
꞊xn	foot, leg	√kʼəm	focal area	n/kʼm꞊énk꞊xn	sole of foot
꞊ene(ʔ)k	belly, under side	√kʼəm	focal area	n/kʼm꞊énk꞊xn	

== See also ==
- Chief Nicola
