= Status of First Nations treaties in British Columbia =

The lack of treaties between the First Nations of British Columbia (BC) and the Canadian Crown is a long-standing problem that became a major issue in the 1990s. In 1763, the British Crown declared that only it could acquire land from First Nations through treaties. Historically, only two treaties were signed with the First Nations of British Columbia. The first of these was the Douglas Treaties, negotiated by Sir James Douglas with the native people of southern Vancouver Island from 1850 to 1854. The second treaty, Treaty 8, signed in 1899, was part of the Numbered Treaties that were signed with First Nations across the Prairie regions. British Columbian Treaty 8 signatories are located in the Peace River Country or the far north-east of BC. For over nine decades no more treaties were signed with First Nations of BC; many Native people wished to negotiate treaties, but successive BC provincial governments refused until the 1990s. A major development was the 1997 decision of the Supreme Court of Canada in the Delgamuukw v. British Columbia case that Aboriginal title still exists in British Columbia and that when dealing with Crown land, the government must consult with and may have to compensate First Nations whose rights are affected.

== History ==
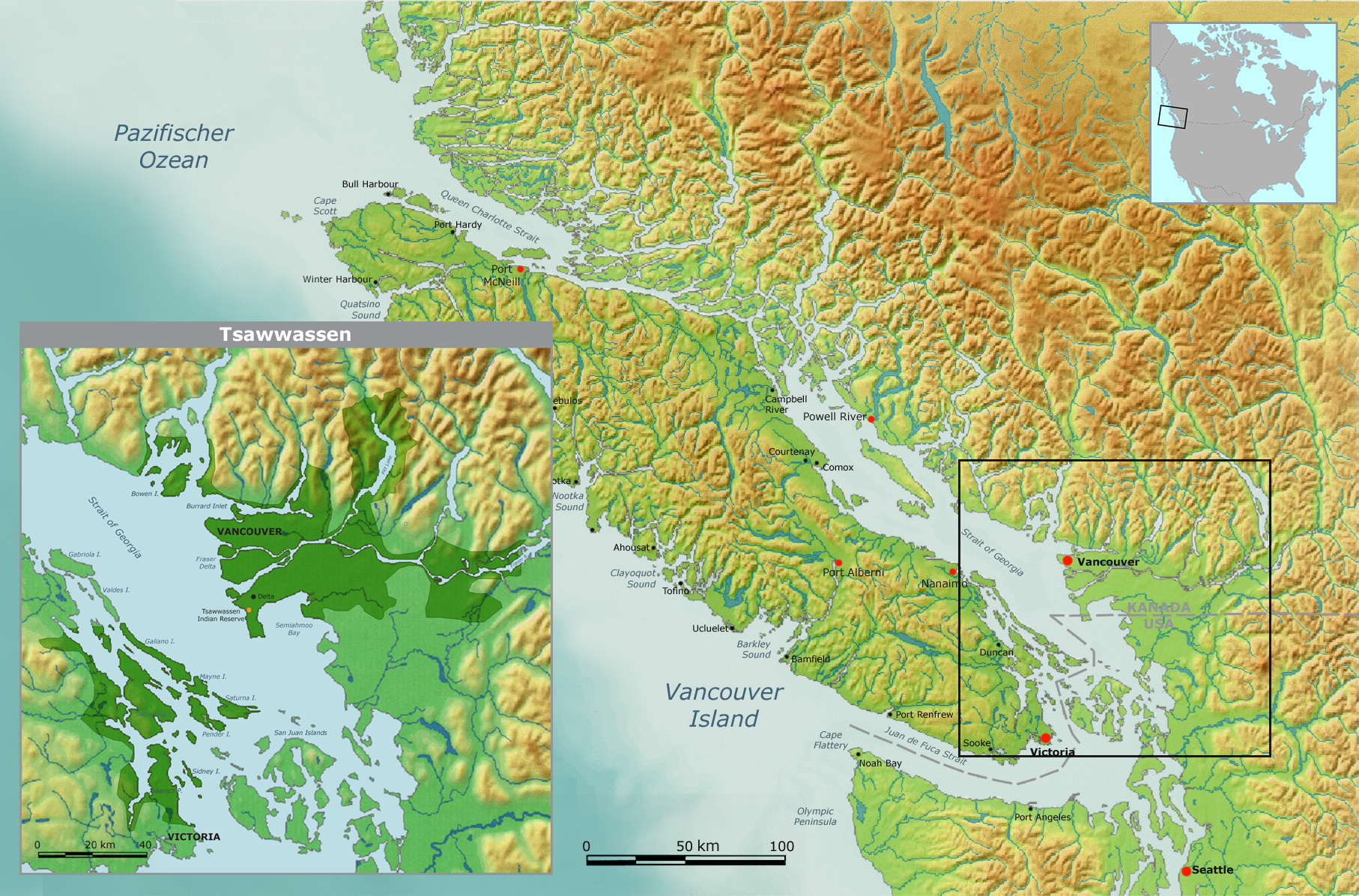
Traditional land of the Tsawwassen First Nation. In their 2009 treaty they will have title to 724 hectares (7.24 km^{2})

In 1991, a Report by the BC Claims Task Force was released recommending a treaty commission be set up. The British Crown passed its authority to negotiate treaties to Canada when it was created in 1867. Even though only the Canadian federal government has the authority to enter into treaties with First Nations in 1992 the newly created British Columbia Treaty Commission (BCTP) and BC Treaty Process included the BC provincial government in the process by agreement among Canada, BC and the First Nations. As of 2009 there are 60 First Nations participating in the BC treaty process. Because some First Nations negotiate at a common table, there are 49 sets of negotiations. From 1992 to 2009 there have been a few treaties completed including the Maa-nulth First Nations Treaty signed on April 9, 2009, and the Tsawwassen First Nation Treaty signed on April 3, 2009. Another Treaty was ratified outside the BC Treaty process in 1999, the Nisga'a Treaty. In May 1993 the Treaty Commission allocated approximately $432 million in negotiation support funding to more than 50 First Nations- $345.6 million in the form of loans and $86.4 million in the form of contributions. Of that money the Treaty Commission's total operating costs from 1993 to March 31, 2009 has spent $34.2 million.

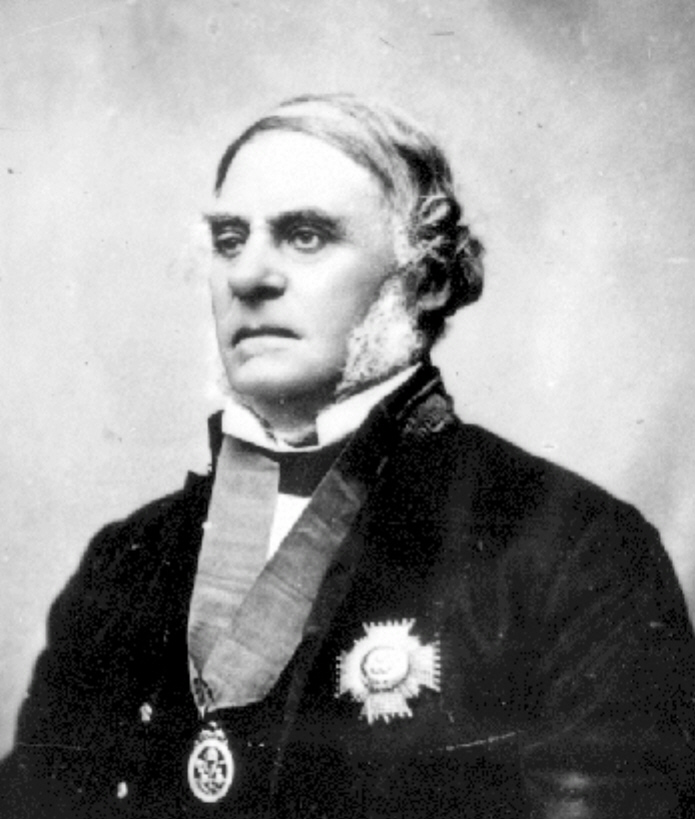
From 1850-1854 Sir James Douglas, governor of the Colony of Vancouver Island, signed a number of treaties called the Douglas Treaties with the First Nations of Vancouver Island

There is considerable disagreement about treaty negotiations; while polls have shown that 25% of British Columbians are opposed to it, a substantial minority of native people consider the current treaty process inadequate and have therefore refused to participate. Tapping into this public sentiment in 2002, the BC Liberal Party mailed out ballots for a provincial British Columbia Aboriginal treaty referendum on principles for treaty negotiations, sparking protests and a boycott. Because of the boycott and general public apathy only about a third of eligible voters took part in the referendum, which passed with 80% of those who responded voting "Yes" to continuing the Treaty Process.

A November 21, 2007 court ruling threatened the Treaty Process. The judge ruled that the Xeni Gwet'in First Nation could demonstrate Aboriginal title to half of the Nemaiah Valley, and that the province had no power over these lands. Under the BC treaty process, negotiating nations have received as little as 5% of their claimed land recognized. Grand Chief Stewart Phillip, president of the Union of B.C. Indian Chiefs, member governments of which reject the treaty process and remain outside it, has called the court victory a "nail in the coffin" of the B.C. treaty process. He went on to say, "Why would any First Nation be foolish enough to ratify any [treaty] settlement for less than five per cent of their territory when the Xeni Gwet'in [have] achieved recognition of their title to 50 per cent of their territory?"

Even with the Xeni Gwet'in ruling First Nations across BC are still continuing the Treaty process advancing through the six-stage process to eventual Treaty implementation. While Chief Stewart Phillip had claimed that the First Nations themselves would slow down or leave the treaty process it is the Canadian government who is holding up many of the treaties.

== BC Treaty negotiation stages ==
In 1992 the Treaty Commission and the treaty process were established in by agreement among Canada, British Columbia and the First Nations Summit. Through the Treaty Commission a process was reached where treaties would follow a six-stage system to successful negotiation.

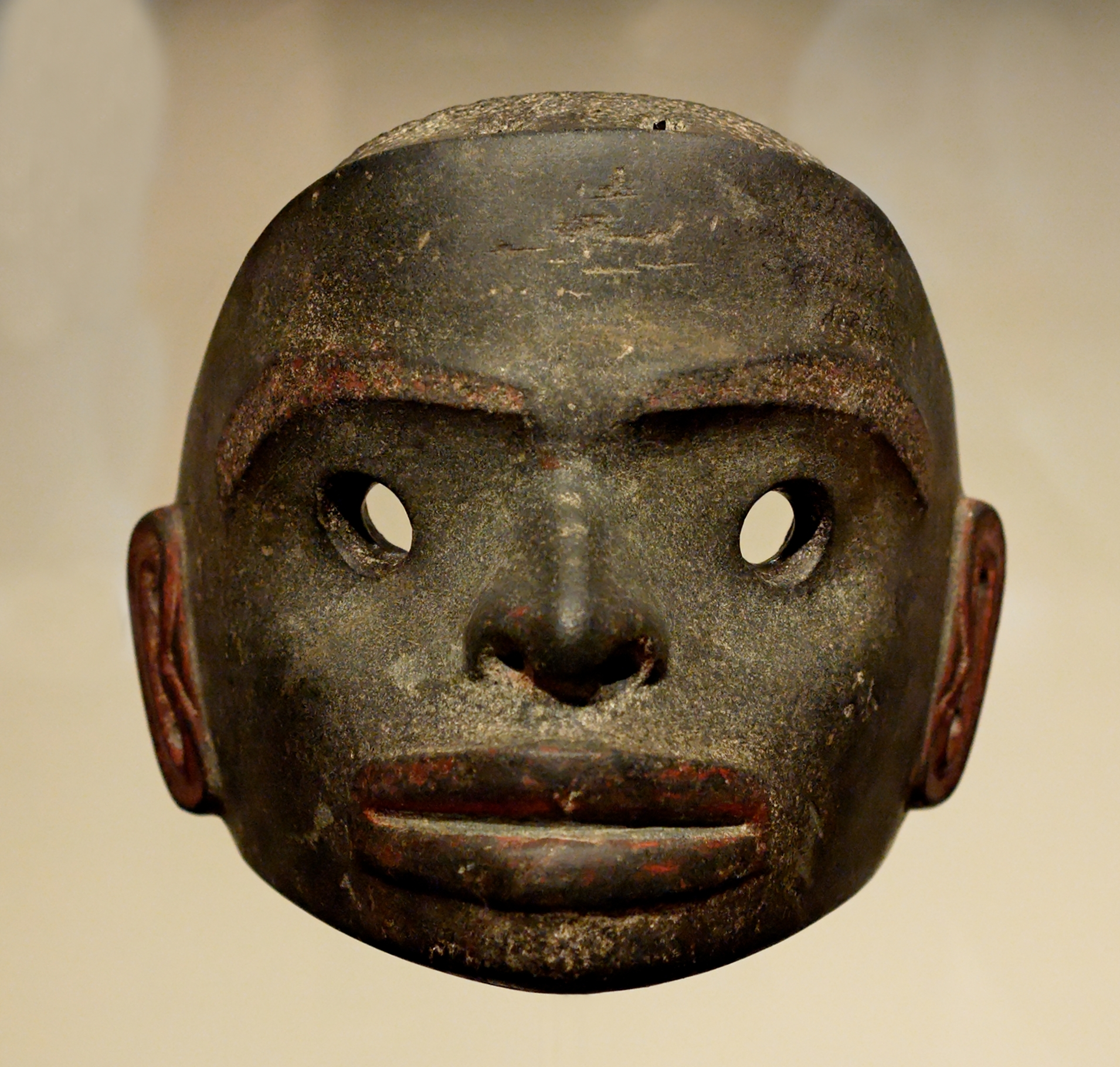
Stone mask of Nisga'a people (Louvre Museum), 18th-early 19th century. The Nisga'a Treaty went into effect on May 11, 2000.

Stage number	Stage name	Description	Reference
Stage 1	Statement of Intent to Negotiate	A First Nation submits a statement of intent (SOI) stating, among other things, who is claiming, proof that the negotiating party is supported by the community and where the claim will be made.	
Stage 2	Readiness to Negotiate	Within 45 days of submitting the SOI the parties must sit down and show that all parties have the will and resources to negotiate a treaty.	
Stage 3	Negotiation of a Framework Agreement	Basically the "table of contents" of a comprehensive treaty. The three parties agree on the subjects to be negotiated and an estimated time frame for stage four agreement-in-principle negotiations.	
Stage 4	Negotiation of an Agreement in Principle	The negotiating parties examine in detail the elements outlined in their framework agreement with the goal of solving the all problems and creating a working treaty.	
Stage 5	Negotiation to Finalize a Treaty	The treaty for all intents and purposes is finished at this stage. The treaty has to be approved by all parties of the negotiating team.	
Stage 6	Implementation of the Treaty	Applying and running the First Nation as set out by the treaty.	

== First Nation treaty status ==
First Nation	Treaty Council affiliation(s)	Region/Location	Treaty Status	Date	Details
Acho Dene Koe First Nation	Deh Cho First Nations Tribal Council	Peace Country (NE BC & Alberta)/NWT/Yukon	Stage 2		
Adams Lake Indian Band	Shuswap Nation Tribal Council	Shuswap	Not participating in treaty process		
Ahousaht First Nation	Nuu-chah-nulth Tribal Council	Vancouver Island	Stage 4		
Aitchelitz Band	Sto:lo Nation	Fraser Valley	Stage 4		
Alexandria First Nation	Tsilhqot'in Tribal Council	Cariboo/Fraser Canyon	Not participating in treaty process		
Alexis Creek First Nation	Tsilhqot'in Tribal Council	Chilcotin	Not participating in treaty process		
Ashcroft Indian Band	Nlaka'pamux Nation Tribal Council	Thompson Country	Not participating in treaty process		
Beecher Bay Indian Band		Vancouver Island	Douglas Treaties	1850-54	Te'mexw Treaty Association; Renegotiating in the BC Treaty Process, presently at Stage 4
Blueberry River First Nations	Treaty 8 Tribal Association	Peace River Country	Treaty 8, Treaty ratified	June 21, 1899	Discussions with BC and Canada outside the treaty process to adjust Treaty 8.
Bonaparte Indian Band	Shuswap Nation Tribal Council	Thompson Country	Not participating in treaty process		
Boothroyd Indian Band	Nlaka'pamux Nation Tribal Council	Fraser Canyon	Not participating in treaty process		
Boston Bar Indian Band	Nlaka'pamux Nation Tribal Council	Fraser Canyon	Not participating in treaty process		
Bridge River Indian Band	Lillooet Tribal Council	Bridge River-Lillooet Country/Fraser Canyon	Not participating in treaty process		
Burns Lake Indian Band	Carrier Sekani Tribal Council	The Interior	Stage 4		
Esketemc First Nation	unaffiliated	Cariboo, Williams Lake	Stage 4		negotiating independently
Cacli'p/Xaxli'p First Nation	Lillooet Tribal Council	Lillooet Country/Fraser Canyon	Stage 3		As of March 2001, the Xaxli'p First Nation left the negotiating table.
Campbell River First Nation (Wei Wai Kum)	Kwakiutl District Council	Vancouver Island	Stage 4		Hamatla Treaty Society In suspension
Canim Lake Band	Northern Shuswap Tribal Council	Cariboo	Stage 4		Community voted to proceed to Stage 5 of BCTC process in February, 2016
Canoe Creek Band/Dog Creek Indian Band	Northern Shuswap Tribal Council	Cariboo	Stage 4		Community voted to proceed into Stage 5 negotiations in February, 2016
Cape Mudge First Nation (Wei Wai Kai)	Kwakiutl District Council	Vancouver Island	Stage 4		Hamatla Treaty Society; In suspension
Carcross/Tagish First Nation	Northern Regional Negotiations Table	Atlin Country/Yukon	Stage 4		
Cayoose Creek First Nation	Lillooet Tribal Council	Lillooet Country/Fraser Canyon	Not participating in treaty process		
Champagne and Aishihik First Nations		Atlin Country/Yukon	Stage 4		Northern Regional Negotiations Table
Chawathil First Nation	Stó:lō Tribal Council	Fraser Valley	Not participating in treaty process		
Cheam Indian Band	Stó:lō Tribal Council	Fraser Valley	Not participating in treaty process		
Chehalis First Nation	no affiliation	Fraser Valley	No Information		
Chemainus First Nation	Naut'sa mawt Tribal Council	Vancouver Island	Stage 4		Hul'qumi'num Treaty Group
Cheslatta Indian Band	unaffiliated	The Interior	Stage 3		Negotiating independently
Coldwater Indian Band	Nicola Tribal Association	Nicola Country	Not participating in treaty process		
Columbia Lake First Nation	Ktunaxa Kinbasket Tribal Council	Kootenays	Stage 4		Also known as ?Akisq'nuk First Nation
Cook's Ferry Indian Band	Nicola Tribal Association	Thompson Country	Not participating in treaty process		
Cowichan Tribes		Vancouver Island	Stage 4		Hul'qumi'num Treaty Group; Cowichan Tribes is the largest First Nation band in BC with 4,324 members
Da'naxda'xw Awaetlatla Nation		Vancouver Island	Stage 4		Winalagalis Treaty Group
Dease River First Nation	Kaska Nation	Cassiar Country	Stage 4		Negotiations are suspended until Canada resolves legal issues related to Yukon, BC boundaries.
Ditidaht First Nation		Vancouver Island	Stage 4		Non-member affiliate of the Nuu-chah-nulth Tribal Council
Doig River First Nation	Treaty 8 Tribal Association	Peace River Country	Treaty 8, Treaty ratified	June 21, 1899	Discussions with BC and Canada outside the treaty process to adjust Treaty 8.
Douglas First Nation	In-SHUCK-ch Nation, Lower Stl'atl'imx Tribal Council	Lower Lillooet River Valley	Stage 5		
Ehattesaht First Nation	Nuu-chah-nulth Tribal Council	Vancouver Island	Stage 4		
Esquimalt First Nation		Vancouver Island	Douglas Treaties	1850-54	
Fort Nelson First Nation		Peace River Country	Treaty 8, Treaty ratified	June 21, 1899	Negotiating independently
Gitanmaax Band Council		Skeena Country, Gitanmaax	Stage 4		Gitxsan Treaty Society
Gitanyow First Nation		Skeena Country	Stage 4		Negotiating independently
Gitsegukla Indian Band		Skeena Country, Kitsegeucla	Stage 4		Gitxsan Treaty Society
Gitwangak Indian Band		Skeena Country, Kitwanga	Stage 4		Gitxsan Treaty Society
Gitxaala Nation		North Coast	Not participating in treaty process		Also known as Kitkatla First Nation; Formerly part of the Gitxsan Treaty Society
Glen Vowell Indian Band		Skeena Country	Stage 4		Gitxsan Treaty Society
Gwa'sala-'Nakwaxda'xw Nation	Kwakiutl District Council	Vancouver Island	Stage 4		Also affiliated with the Winalagalis Treaty Group
Gwawaenuk Tribe		Vancouver Island	No Information		INAC number - 627
Halfway River First Nation	Treaty 8 Tribal Association	Peace River Country	Treaty 8, Treaty ratified	June 21, 1899	Discussions with BC and Canada outside the treaty process to adjust Treaty 8.
Hagwilget Village First Nation	Office of the Wet'suwet'en	Bulkley Country/Skeena Country	Stage 4		
Halalt First Nation		Vancouver Island	Stage 4		Hul'qumi'num Treaty Group
Hartley Bay Indian Band		British Columbia Coast	Stage 4		Tsimshian First Nations; Also known as the Gitga'at Nation and Gitga'at First Nation
Heiltsuk Nation		Central Coast, Bella Bella, Waxvwuisaxv	Stage 4		Negotiating independently
Hesquiaht First Nation	Nuu-chah-nulth Tribal Council	Vancouver Island	Stage 4		
High Bar First Nation	Shuswap Nation Tribal Council	Fraser Canyon/Cariboo	Not participating in treaty process		
Homalco Indian Band	Naut'sa mawt Tribal Council	Sunshine Coast	Stage 4		
Hupacasath First Nation	Nuu-chah-nulth Tribal Council but Negotiating independently	Vancouver Island	Stage 4		
Huu-ay-aht First Nation	Maa-nulth Treaty Society	Vancouver Island	Stage 6	April 9, 2009	
Iskut First Nation	Tahltan Nation	Stikine Country	Not participating in treaty process		
Kamloops Indian Band	Shuswap Nation Tribal Council	Thompson Country	Not participating in treaty process		
Kanaka Bar Indian Band	Fraser Canyon Indian Administration	Fraser Canyon	Not participating in treaty process		
Katzie First Nation		Fraser Valley, Pitt Meadows	Stage 4		Negotiating independently
Kispiox Band Council		Skeena Country, Kispiox	Stage 4		Gitxsan Treaty Society
Haisla Nation		British Columbia Coast	Stage 4		Negotiating independently
Kitselas First Nation	Tsimshian First Nations	British Columbia Coast	Stage 4		
Kitasoo/Xaixais First Nation	Oweekeno-Kitasoo-Nuxalk Tribal Council	Bella Coola, Central Coast	Stage 4		Also part of the Tsimshian First Nations
Kitsumkalum First Nation		Skeena Country	Stage 4		Tsimshian First Nations
Klahoose First Nation	Naut'sa mawt Tribal Council	Sunshine Coast	Stage 4		
Kluskus First Nation	Carrier Chilcotin Tribal Council		Not participating in treaty process		
K'ómoks (Comox) First Nation	Kwakiutl District Council	Vancouver Island	Stage 4		in suspension
Kwadacha First Nation	Kaska Nation	Cassiar Country	Stage 4		Negotiations are suspended until Canada resolves legal issues related to Yukon, BC boundaries.
Kwakiutl First Nation		Vancouver Island	Stage 4		in suspension
Kwantlen First Nation	Stó:lō Tribal Council	Fraser Valley	Not participating in treaty process		
Kwaw-kwaw-a-pilt First Nation	Stó:lō Tribal Council	Fraser Valley	Not participating in treaty process		
Kwiakah First Nations	Hamatla Treaty Society	Vancouver Island	Stage 4		In suspension
Kwicksutaineuk-ah-kwa-mish First Nation	Musgamagw Tsawataineuk Tribal Council	Vancouver Island/Queen Charlotte Strait	Not participating in treaty process		
Kwikwetlem First Nation	Sto:lo (unaffiliated)	Fraser Valley, Coquitlam/Port Coquitlam	No Information		INAC number - 560
Kyuquot/Cheklesahht First Nation	Maa-nulth Treaty Society	Vancouver Island	Stage 6	April 9, 2009	
Lake Babine Nation	Negotiating independently	Omineca Country/Bulkley Country	Stage 4		
Lake Cowichan First Nation	Hul'qumi'num Treaty Group	Vancouver Island	Stage 4		
Lax-kw'alaams First Nation	Negotiating independently	North Coast	Stage 2		
Leq'a:mel First Nation	Sto:lo Nation	Fraser Valley, Nicomen Island	Stage 4		
Lheidli T'enneh Band	Negotiating independently	Prince George	Stage 5		On March 30, 2007, the Lheidli T'enneh Band held a ratification vote on the Final Agreement. With a final count of 123 against and 111 in favour, the Lheidli T'enneh community did not ratify the Final Agreement.
Liard First Nation	Kaska Tribal Council	Cassiar Country	Stage 2		
Lil'wat Nation	Lillooet Tribal Council	Pemberton Valley	Not participating in treaty process		aka the Lil'wat Nation or the Mount Currie Indian Band
Little Shuswap Indian Band	Shuswap Nation Tribal Council	Shuswap Country, Chase	Not participating in treaty process		
Lower Kootenay First Nation	Ktunaxa Kinbasket Tribal Council	Kootenays	Stage 4		
Lower Nicola First Nation	Nicola Tribal Association	Nicola Country	Not participating in treaty process		
Lower Post First Nation	Kaska Nation	Liard Country	Stage 4 (suspended)		Canada does not classify the Lower Post First Nation as a band, but rather as one of eight reserves belonging to the Yukon-based Liard First Nation. Negotiations are suspended until Canada resolves legal issues related to Yukon, BC boundaries.
Lower Similkameen Indian Band	Okanagan Nation Alliance	Similkameen Country	Not participating in treaty process		
Lyackson First Nation	Hul'qumi'num Treaty Group	Vancouver Island	Stage 4		
Lytton First Nation	unaffiliated	Fraser Canyon	Not participating in treaty process		
McLeod Lake Indian Band	Treaty 8	Northern Interior	Treaty 8, Treaty ratified	June, 2000	The McLeod Nation was originally left out of the Treaty 8 bill even though they live on its land. The McLeod Lake Indian Band Treaty No. 8 Adhesion and Settlement Agreement rectified this oversight.
Malahat First Nation	Te'mexw Treaty Association	Vancouver Island	Douglas Treaties	1850-54	Renegotiating in the BC Treaty Process, presently at Stage 4
Mamalilikulla-Qwe'Qwa'Sot'Em First Nation	Kwakiutl District Council	Vancouver Island	No Information		INAC number - 629
Matsqui First Nation	Sto:lo Nation	Fraser Valley, Matsqui	Not participating in treaty process		One of four Sto:lo Nation members not in the treaty process
Metlakatla First Nation	Tsimshian First Nations	British Columbia Coast	Stage 4		
Mowachaht/Muchalaht First Nations	Nuu-chah-nulth Tribal Council	Vancouver Island	Stage 4		
Musqueam Indian Band	Negotiating independently	Fraser Valley, Vancouver	Stage 4		
Nadleh Whut'en First Nation	Carrier Sekani Tribal Council	Central Interior	Stage 4		Until 1990, it was referred to as the Fraser Lake Indian Band.
Nak'azdli Band	Carrier Sekani Tribal Council	Central Interior	Stage 4		
‘Namgis First Nation	Musgamagw Tsawataineuk Tribal Council	Alert Bay, Vancouver Island	Stage 4-No longer negotiating		
Nanoose First Nation	Te'mexw Treaty Association	Nanoose Bay, Vancouver Island	Douglas Treaties	1850-54	Renegotiating in the BC Treaty Process, presently at Stage 4
Nazko First Nation	The Interior	Negotiating independently	Stage 4		Is a member of the Carrier-Chilcotin Tribal Council
Nee-Tahi-Buhn Band		The Interior	No Information		INAC number - 726
Neskonlith Indian Band	Shuswap Nation Tribal Council	Shuswap Country	Not participating in treaty process		
Nicomen Indian Band	Fraser Canyon Indian Administration, Nicola Tribal Association	Thompson Country	Not participating in treaty process		
Nisga'a Tribal Council	Negotiated independently	North Coast, Nass Country	Stage 6	May 11, 2000	Nisga'a Final Agreement
N'quatqua First Nation	Negotiating independently	Bridge River Country	No Information		INAC number - 556
Nooaitch Indian Band	Nicola Tribal Association	Nicola Country	Not participating in treaty process		
Nuchatlaht First Nation	Nuu-chah-nulth Tribal Council	Vancouver Island	Stage 4		
Nuxálk Nation	Oweekeno-Kitasoo-Nuxalk Tribal Council	Bella Coola, Central Coast	Not participating in treaty process		
Okanagan Indian Band	Okanagan Nation Alliance	Okanagan, Vernon	Not participating in treaty process		
Old Massett Village Council	Council of the Haida Nation	Haida Gwaii	Stage 2		In December 2009 a reconciliation protocol was signed outside of the BC Treaty Process between the BC government and the First Nations represented by the Haida Nation. Along a number of economic issues being settled an agreement was reached to rename the Queen Charlotte Islands to the Haida Gwaii.
Oregon Jack Creek Indian Band	Nlaka'pamux Nation Tribal Council	Thompson Country	Not participating in treaty process		
Osoyoos Indian Band	Okanagan Nation Alliance	Okanagan	Not participating in treaty process		
Pacheedaht First Nation	Negotiating independently	Vancouver Island	Stage 4		Not a member of the Nuu-chah-nulth Tribal Council and define themselves differently
Pauquachin	Sencot'en Alliance	Vancouver Island	Douglas Treaties	1850-54	Fighting other First Nations over claims made in the BC Treaty process
Pavilion Indian Band	Lillooet Tribal Council	Lillooet Country/Fraser Canyon	Not participating in treaty process		Also known as Ts'kw'aylaxw First Nation
Penelakut First Nations	Hul'qumi'num Treaty Group	Vancouver Island	Stage 4		
Penticton Indian Band	Okanagan Nation Alliance	Okanagan	Not participating in treaty process		
Peters Band	Sto:lo Nation unaffiliated	Fraser Valley	No Information		INAC number - 586
Popkum Band	Sto:lo Nation	Fraser Valley	Stage 4		
Prophet River Band	Treaty 8 Tribal Association	Peace River Country	Treaty 8, Treaty ratified	June 21, 1899	Discussions with BC and Canada outside the treaty process to adjust Treaty 8.
New Westminster Indian Band	Negotiating independently	Fraser Valley, New Westminster	The New Westminster Indian Band is not a legitimate First Nation, but is a composite band with no right to Indigenous Land. They are not officially involved in treaty negotiations		
Qualicum First Nation		Vancouver Island	No Information		
Quatsino First Nation	Kwakiutl District Council	Vancouver Island	Stage 4		Also affiliated with the Winalagalis Treaty Group
Red Bluff First Nation	Carrier-Chilcotin Tribal Council		Not participating in treaty process		
Saik'uz First Nation	Carrier Sekani Tribal Council	The Interior	Stage 4		
Samahquam First Nation	In-SHUCK-ch Nation/Lower Stl'atl'imx Tribal Council	Lower Lillooet River Valley	Stage 5		
Saulteau First Nation	Treaty 8 Tribal Association	Peace River Country	Treaty 8, Treaty ratified	June 21, 1899	Discussions with BC and Canada outside the treaty process to adjust Treaty 8.
Simpcw North Thompson Indian Band	Shuswap Nation Tribal Council	Thompson Country	Not participating in treaty process		
Scowlitz First Nation	Stó:lō Tribal Council	Fraser Valley	Not participating in treaty process		
Seabird Island Band	Stó:lō Tribal Council	Fraser Valley	Not participating in treaty process		
Sechelt Indian Band	unaffiliatd	Sunshine Coast	Stage 5	April 16, 1999	Negotiating independently; Negotiations have been on hold since October 1999, when the Sechelt requested a break in final agreement negotiations in order to consult with their community members.
Semiahmoo First Nation	Sencot'en Alliance	Fraser Valley, White Rock	[[]]	1852	Sencot'en Alliance; Fighting other First Nations over claims made in the BC Treaty process
Seton Lake First Nation	Lillooet Tribal Council	Bridge River-Lillooet Country	Not participating in treaty process		On November 4, 2008, The Province, Canada and the Seton Lake Indian Band celebrated the settlement of the remaining cut-off claims in British Columbia.
Shackan First Nation	Nicola Tribal Association	Nicola Country	Not participating in treaty process		
Shuswap Indian Band	Ktunaxa Kinbasket Tribal Council	Shuswap Country	Stage 4		Also part of the Shuswap Nation Tribal Council
Sinixt Nation	Sinixt Nation	West Kootenay	Not participating in treaty process		
Siska Indian Band	Nicola Tribal Association	Fraser Canyon	Not participating in treaty process		
Skatin First Nation	In-SHUCK-ch Nation/Lower Stl'atl'imx Tribal Council	Lower Lillooet River Valley	Stage 5		
Skawahlook First Nation	Sto:lo Nation	Fraser Valley	Stage 4		
Skeetchestn Indian Band	Shuswap Nation Tribal Council	Thompson Country	Not participating in treaty process		
Skidegate Band Council	Council of the Haida Nation	Haida Gwaii	Stage 2		In December 2009 a reconciliation protocol was signed outside of the BC Treaty Process between the BC government and the First Nations represented by the Haida Nation. Along a number of economic issues being settled an agreement was reached to rename the Queen Charlotte Islands to the Haida Gwaii.
Skin Tyee First Nation		Omineca Country/Nechako Country	No Information		INAC number - 729
Shxw'ow'hamel First Nation	Stó:lō Tribal Council	Fraser Valley	Not participating in treaty process		
Skowkale First Nation	Sto:lo Nation	Fraser Valley	Stage 4		
Skuppah First Nation	Fraser Canyon Indian Administration	Fraser Canyon	Not participating in treaty process		
Skwah First Nation		Fraser Valley	No information		Not to be confused with Skway or Shxwhá:y Village which is also located near Chilliwack in the Fraser Valley.
Shxwhá:y Village	Sto:lo Nation	Fraser Valley	Not participating in treaty process		One of four Sto:lo Nation members not in the treaty process Also known as the Skway First Nation. Not to be confused with Skwah which is also located near Chilliwack in the Fraser Valley.
Sliammon First Nation		British Columbia	Stage 5	December 6, 2003	Negotiating independently
Snuneymuxw First Nation		Vancouver Island, Nanaimo	Douglas Treaties	1850-54	Negotiating independently; Renegotiating in the BC Treaty Process, presently at Stage 4
Soda Creek/Deep Creek Band	Northern Shuswap Tribal Council	Cariboo	Stage 4		Community voted to proceed to Stage 5 BCTC negotiations, February 2016
Songhees First Nation		Vancouver Island	Douglas Treaties	1850-54	Te'mexw Treaty Association; Renegotiating in the BC Treaty Process, presently at Stage 4
Soowahlie First Nation	Stó:lō Tribal Council	Fraser Valley	Not participating in treaty process		
Spallumcheen Indian Band	Shuswap Nation Tribal Council	Shuswap-Okanagan	Not participating in treaty process		
Spuzzum Indian Band	Nlaka'pamux Nation Tribal Council and Fraser Canyon Indian Administration	Fraser Canyon	Not participating in treaty process		
Squamish Nation	unaffiliated	Howe Sound/Burrard Inlet	Stage 3		Negotiating independently
Squiala First Nation	Sto:lo Nation	Fraser Valley	Not participating in treaty process		One of four Sto:lo Nation members not in the treaty process
St. Mary's Indian Band	Ktunaxa Kinbasket Tribal Council	Kootenays	Stage 4		
Stellat'en First Nation	Carrier Sekani Tribal Council	The Interior	Stage 4		Reserves 5 and 6 split from Nadleh Whut'en First Nation to make the Stellat'en First Nation.
Stone First Nation	Tsilhqot'in Tribal Council	Chilcotin	Not participating in treaty process		
Sumas First Nation	Sto:lo Nation	Fraser Valley, Abbotsford	Not participating in treaty process		One of four Sto:lo Nation members not in the treaty process
Tahltan First Nation	Tahltan Nation	Stikine Country	Not participating in treaty process		
Takla Lake First Nation	Carrier Sekani Tribal Council	The Interior	Stage 4		
T'it'q'et First Nation	Lillooet Tribal Council	Lillooet Country	Not participating in treaty process		
T'sou-ke Nation	unaffiliated	Vancouver Island	Douglas Treaties	1850-54	Te'mexw Treaty Association; Renegotiating in the BC Treaty Process, presently at Stage 4
Tl'azt'en Nation	Carrier Sekani Tribal Council	The Interior	Stage 4		
Taku River Tlingit First Nation		Atlin Country	Stage 4		Northern Regional Negotiations Table
Tl'etinqox-t'in Government Office	Tsilhqot'in Tribal Council	Chilcotin	Not participating in treaty process		
Tla-o-qui-aht First Nations	Nuu-chah-nulth Tribal Council	Vancouver Island	Stage 4		Negotiating independently
Tlatlasikwala Nation	Kwakiutl District Council	Vancouver Island	Stage 4		Also affiliated with the Winalagalis Treaty Group
Tlowitsis Tribe		Vancouver Island	Stage 4		Negotiating independently
Tobacco Plains Indian Band	Ktunaxa Kinbasket Tribal Council	Kootenays	Stage 4		
Toosey First Nation	Chilcotin		Stage 4		Negotiating independently; Also known as the Tl'esqox First Nation
Toquaht First Nation	Maa-nulth Treaty Society	Vancouver Island	Stage 6	April 9, 2009	
Tsartlip	Sencot'en Alliance	Vancouver Island	Douglas Treaties	1850-54	Sencot'en Alliance; Fighting other First Nations over claims made in the BC Treaty process
Tsawout		Vancouver Island	Douglas Treaties	1850-54	Sencot'en Alliance; Fighting other First Nations over claims made in the BC Treaty process
Tsawataineuk First Nation	Musgamagw Tsawataineuk Tribal Council	Vancouver Island	Not participating in treaty process		
Tsawwassen First Nation		Fraser Valley, Delta	Stage 6	April 3, 2009	Negotiated independently
Tsay Keh Dene Band	unaffiliated	Northern Interior	Stage 4		Negotiating independently
Tseshaht First Nation	Nuu-chah-nulth Tribal Council	Vancouver Island	Stage 4		
Tseycum First Nation		Vancouver Island	Douglas Treaties	1850-54	Signatory in the Douglas Treaties 1850-54
Tsleil-Waututh First Nation	Naut'sa mawt Tribal Council	Fraser Valley, Vancouver	Stage 4		Negotiating independently; Also known as the Burrard Indian Band
Tzeachten First Nation	Sto:lo Nation	Fraser Valley	Stage 4		
Uchucklesaht First Nation	Maa-nulth Treaty Society	Vancouver Island	Stage 6	April 9, 2009	
Ulkatcho First Nation	Carrier-Chilcotin Tribal Council		Not participating in treaty process		
Union Bar First Nation	Sto:lo Nation	Fraser Valley	No Information		
Upper Nicola Indian Band	Nicola Tribal Association	Nicola Country	Not participating in treaty process		
Upper Similkameen Indian Band	Okanagan Nation Alliance	Nicola-Similkameen Country	Not participating in treaty process		In 2001, the Upper Similkameen Indian Band (USIB) Cut-Off Claim Settlement Agreement was ratified by Canada, B.C. and the USIB.
West Moberly First Nations		Peace River Country	Treaty 8, Treaty ratified	June 21, 1899	Negotiating independently
Westbank First Nation	Okanagan Nation Alliance	Okanagan	Stage 4		
Wet'suwet'en First Nation	Carrier Sekani Tribal Council	The Interior	Stage 4		Formerly known as the Broman Lake Indian Band
Whispering Pines/Clinton Indian Band	Shuswap Nation Tribal Council	Thompson-Cariboo	Not participating in treaty process		
Williams Lake Indian Band	Northern Shuswap Tribal Council	Cariboo	Stage 4		Also known as T'exelc, Sugarcane, The Cane or SCB: Community endorsed moving on to Stage 5 of the BC Treaty Process in April, 2016.
Witset First Nation	Office of the Wet'suwet'en	North Coast	Stage 4		
Wuikinuxv Nation	Negotiating independently	Central Coast, Rivers Inlet	Stage 4		Affiliate of the Oweekeno-Kitasoo-Nuxalk Tribal Council. Formerly the Oweekeno Nation.
Xeni Gwet'in First Nation	Tsilhqot'in Tribal Council	Chilcotin	Not participating in treaty process		Under that BC Treaty Process, bands have received title to about five per cent of the land they have claimed plus cash. In 2007 the Xeni Gwet'in First Nation won a court ruling that gave them 50% of their claim.
Yakweakwioose First Nation	Sto:lo Nation	Fraser Valley	Stage 4		
Yale First Nation	Negotiating independently	Fraser Canyon	Stage 6	February 5, 2010	Implementation halted, agreement not in full force and effect.
Yekooche First Nation	Negotiating independently	Omineca Country	Stage 5		
Yuułuʔiłʔatḥ (Ucluelet First Nation)	Maa-nulth Treaty Society	Vancouver Island	Stage 6	April 9, 2009	

== See also ==
- British Columbia Treaty Process
- British Columbia Aboriginal treaty referendum, 2002
- List of First Nations governments in British Columbia
- The Canadian Crown and Aboriginal peoples
- Royal Proclamation of 1763
