= Kwakiutl District Council =

First Nations tribal council in British Columbia, Canada

The Kwakiutl District Council, also spelled Kwakwewlth District Council and Kwakiuth District Council, pronounced Kwagiulth District Council, is a First Nations tribal council based on Vancouver Island in British Columbia, Canada, based in the community of Campbell River, British Columbia in the northern Strait of Georgia but including member nations spanning northern Vancouver Island as far as Quatsino Sound. The nations represented within the Kwakiutl District Council are all Kwakwaka'wakw (speakers of Kwak'wala).

== Treaty groups within the Kwakiutl District Council ==
The Quatsino First Nation, Tlatlasikwala Nation, Da'naxda'xw Awaetlatla Nation, and Gwa'Sala-'Nakwaxda'xw Nation are members of the Winalagalis Treaty Group.

The Kwiakah First Nation, Wei Wai Kai (Cape Mudge First Nation) and Wei Wai Kum (Campbell River First Nation) are members of the Laich-Kwil-Tach Treaty Group.

The Kwakiutl First Nation of Fort Rupert is not in the treaty process at present.

== Member governments ==
- Laich-kwil-tach Treaty Group
  - Wei Wai Kum First Nation
  - We Wai Kai Nation (Cape Mudge)
  - Kwiakah First Nation, also spelled Kwix̌a
- K'ómoks First Nation aka Comox Indian Band
- Da'naxda'xw Awaetlatla Nation
- Gwa'Sala-'Nakwaxda'xw Nation
- Kwakiutl First Nation
- Mamalilikulla-Qwe'Qwa'Sot'Em First Nation
- Quatsino First Nation
- Tlatlasikwala Nation

== See also ==
- List of tribal councils in British Columbia
  - Winalagalis Treaty Group
  - Hamatla Treaty Society
  - Musgamagw Dzawadaʼenuxw Tribal Council
