= Kuper Island Indian Residential School =

Defunct Canadian residential school

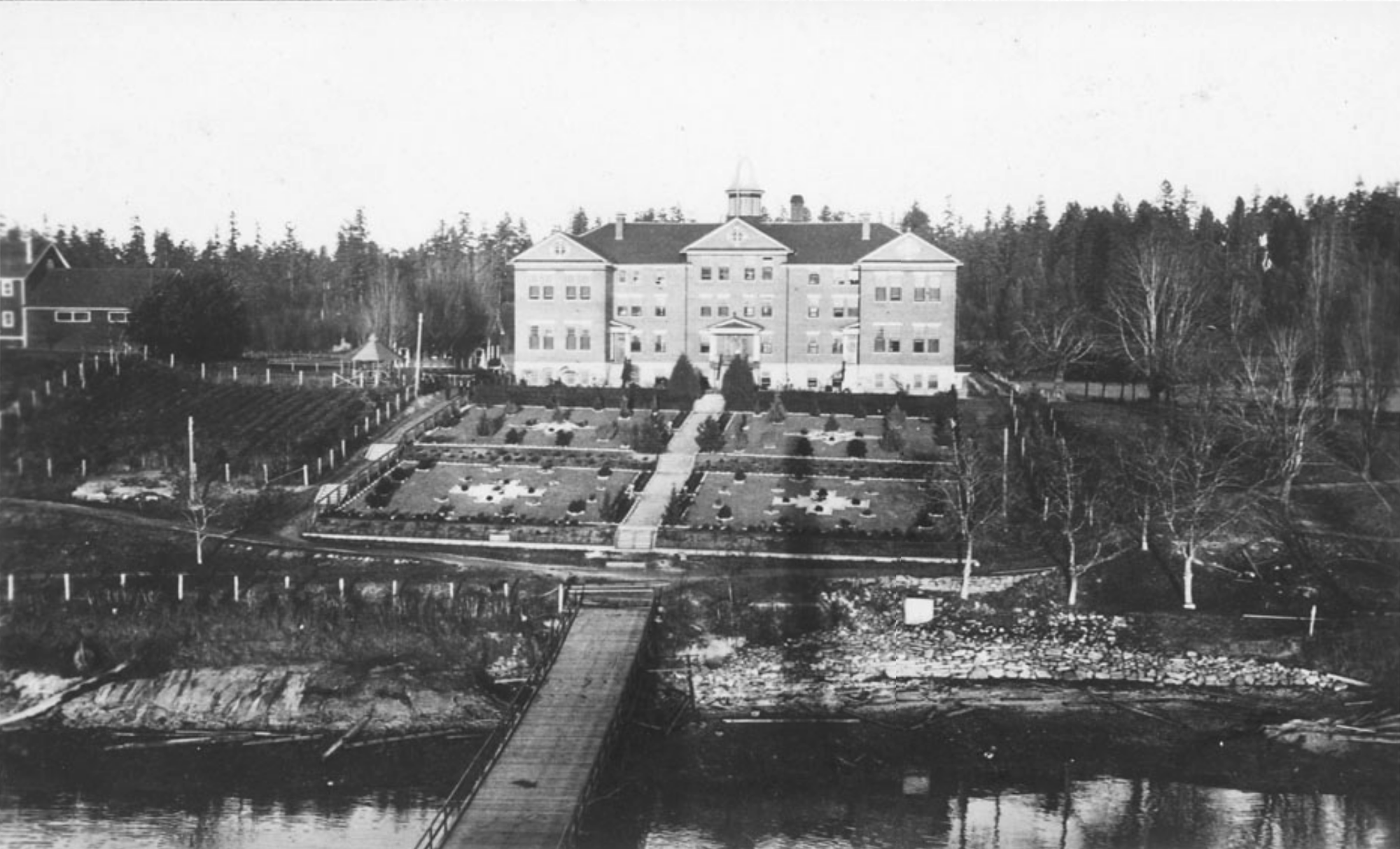
- June 19, 1941 view of Kuper Island Indian Residential School
- Kuper Island, British Columbia; Canada

Information
- Type: Canadian Indian residential school
- Religious affiliation: Catholic
- Established: 1889
- Closed: 1975
- Authority: Catholic Church in Canada
- Oversight: Crown–Indigenous Relations and Northern Affairs Canada
- Language: English

The Kuper Island Indian Residential School, also known as Kuper Island Indian Industrial School, was a Canadian Indian residential school located on Kuper Island (now known as Penelakut Island), near Chemainus, British Columbia, that operated from 1889 to 1975. The institution was operated by the Roman Catholic Church, with funding from the Department of Indian Affairs.

On 12 July 2021, the Penelakut First Nation announced that more than 160 unmarked graves had been found on the grounds and foreshore of the former institution. In August 2025, Penelakut Tribe released interim findings of new research into archival records, indicating that as many as 171 attendees are known to have died.

It has also been asserted that attendance was mandatory for children from the then-Cowichan Indian Agency and adjacent Coast Salish peoples. CBC's Ombudsman, in reviewing a complaint regarding language related to residential school attendance, cited the 2008 Statement of apology to former students of Indian Residential Schools: "the residential school system was intended to “remove and isolate children from the influence of their homes, families, traditions and culture” further supports the idea that residential school attendance was involuntary."

== History ==
The school opened in 1889. In 1896, a poll found that 107 of the 264 students who had attended the school had died. The cancellation of holidays at the school led students to try to burn it down in 1896. In 1922 a school inspector wrote that “The Indians are inclined to boycott this school on account of so many deaths.”

In 1959 sisters Beverly and Patricia Marilyn Joseph drowned while trying to escape the school. In 1969 the federal government of Canada took over the school, and closed it in 1975. The school building was demolished in the 1980s.

The school was nicknamed "Alcatraz" or "Canada's Alcatraz", after the American prison, due to its remote island location and the difficulty of escape.

== Administration ==
The Roman Catholic Diocese of Victoria was the first operator of the school, with Rev. G. Donekele acting as principal from 1890 to February 1907. P. Claessen and Bishop W. Lemmens of the Missionaries of the Company of Mary (Montfort Missionaries) replaced Donekele after his death in 1907. By 1957, the Oblates of Mary Immaculate were listed as the operators of the school. In 1969 the Canadian federal government assumed management.

== Experiences of survivors ==
Experiences of some who attended the Kuper Island Residential School have been shared publicly through media.

In 1995 Oblate Brother Glen Doughty pled guilty to three charges of indecent assault and gross indecency for offences committed at Kuper Island Residential School between 1967 and 1968.

Qwul'sih'yah'maht, Robina Anne Thomas, looked at experiences of three former students of the institution from Halalt First Nation and Cowichan Tribes through a storytelling methodology in her social work thesis.

No time to say goodbye: Children's stories of Kuper Island Residential School by Sylvia Olsen with Rita Morris and Ann Sam is a fictional account of five children sent to the school, based on the recollections of a number of Tsartlip First Nations people. In the Elder Project no. 19, The Rivers Where We Sing, a number of Elders make reference to their experiences as former residential school students.

A 1998 film, Kuper Island: Return to the Healing Circle, explored effects of the institution and healing journeys of survivors twenty years after it closed. In 2022, the filmmaker returned to make a follow-up documentary, Penelakut: Returning to the Healing Circle, to look at changes in the intervening period, and the experiences of intergenerational survivors.

In May 2022, a CBC podcast series by Duncan McCue explored the stories of four children who attended the institution, with sources that included police investigations and coroner's reports, in addition to interviews with abusers and community members.

Also in May 2022, Penelakut Elder Raymond Tony Charlie published a book, In The Shadow of the Red Brick Building, relating his experiences at the Kuper Island institution and at St. Mary's residential school in Mission, BC. In July 2021 he shared a poem about healing that he wrote for survivors of the schools.

Other accounts have been the subject of controversy, including that in 1930, German doctors are alleged to have arrived to inject large syringes into the chest of some students, resulting in several deaths. While author Terry Glavin wrote in 2008 that there is "not a shred of evidence" for some such assertions, since then new application of technology such as ground penetrating radar confirms community knowledge of some past events. With calls for the release of records related to Kuper Island and other institutions accelerating early in 2021, additional information may be forthcoming.

== Unmarked graves ==
In 2018, Penelakut Chief and Council and Elders' Committee met with researchers from the University of British Columbia to discuss possible identification of unmarked graves using ground-penetrating radar (GPR). This work would build on previous GPR surveys conducted in known cemeteries in the community. In the context of the Truth and Reconciliation Commission: Calls to Action, these conversations sought to ensure that the work occurs in a community-led way.

On 12 July 2021, Penelakut Chief and leadership sent a letter to neighbouring tribes and organizations, confirming that more than 160 undocumented and unmarked graves had been found on their grounds and foreshore. This information was updated in August 2025, when Penelakut leadership and technical experts reported that through use of GPR and LiDAR and other technologies they have surveyed over 3,500 square metres of land, identifying possible, probable, and likely unmarked graves. Work is ongoing with the guidance of the Elders' Committee.

== Community Responses ==
With the release of information about unmarked burials at the former Kamloops Indian Residential School in Spring 2021, a group of residential school survivors launched a fundraising campaign to support the search for unmarked graves at the former Kuper Island institution and at other Vancouver Island residential school sites. The original goal of the fundraiser was met, with additional funds going to Ahousaht and Snuneymuxw First Nations to support ground-penetrating radar searches at sites in their territories.

As a response to emerging news related residential schools through Spring 2021, including the Kuper Island institution, Penelakut Elders Ray Tony Charlie and Florence James (who passed in June 2025) led a listening circle to focus on support, learning, and healing. The virtual gathering on June 30, 2021 was hosted by the Centre for Global Studies and the POLIS Project on Ecological Governance at the University of Victoria, and was attended by 180 people.

On August 2, 2021 Penelakut First Nation held the first Spune’luxutth Sulxwe’en Memorial Walk (or March for the Children) in the neighbouring town of Chemainus, BC. Representatives from several Island First Nations attended, as did a handful from areas around the Lower Mainland and interior of B.C., together with school trustees, local representatives of government, and university researchers who have partnered with Penelakut First Nation in their search for information regarding unmarked burials. In spite of the ongoing COVID-19 pandemic, the march was attended by thousands from across Vancouver Island and the province of British Columbia. The march was followed on August 4 by healing sessions held in the Penelakut community for residential school and intergenerational survivors. The March for the Children has continued as an annual event, with the fourth occurring in Chemainus on August 4, 2025.

== See also ==
- Canadian Indian residential schools gravesite discoveries
- List of Indian residential schools in Canada
- Anglican Mission at Hwlumelhtsu (Lamalchi Bay)
