= Jean Baptiste Paul =

20th-century Canadian wrestler

Jean Baptiste Paul (1896 – November 23, 1966) was a Canadian wrestler from the Tsartlip First Nation, who is better known by his ring name, Chief Thunderbird.

== Early life and education ==
Paul was born into the Tsartlip Nation in Brentwood, Vancouver Island. His father was Tommy Paul, and his grandfather was Ben Paul; both men were chiefs, and Jean Baptiste Paul was also a hereditary chief. He grew up in Saanich, British Columbia. Although his family wanted him to become a medicine man, Paul was uninterested. He ran away from home and attended a residential school on Kuper Island. Following this, he attended the Cushman School in Tacoma, Washington where he competed in baseball, basketball, boxing, football, lacrosse, soccer, track and field, and wrestling.

== Wrestling career ==
Paul debuted in 1933 as Chief Thunderbird. He wore "regalia" for his matches (more stereotypical than true Tsartlip regalia), and he is cited as being one of several wrestlers to popularize "stereotyped ring characters". His signature move was the "Saanich Snap", which was similar to an "Indian Deathgrip", but he used his arms. His career took him both across North America, to locations such as Hawaii, Salt Lake City, and to Australia and New Zealand. He also continued to compete in Canada.

In one 1935 match against Babe Smallinski, Chief Thunderbird's tackle knocked out both men, but Chief Thunderbird recovered first and was able to win the match.

In the early 1940s Paul took time off from wrestling, although he returned to the sport in the late 1940s.

In the 1950s, Chief Thunderbird competed in the United Kingdom, where he found popularity during his tours in 1951-1952 and 1954–1955.

In 1955 he toured India.

He retired in 1955 following an injury where he broke his leg in two places; he had previously said he planned to wrestle until he turned sixty.

== Post-wrestling life and death ==
In February 1957 Paul spoke out against the proposed transfer of 700 acres of Tsartlip-controlled property near Goldstream to the Provincial government. Paul enjoyed gardening, playing instruments, and dancing in his retirement.

Paul died in November 1966 after two weeks in St. Joseph's Hospital, Saanich, British Columbia.

== Personal life ==
Paul and his wife Julia had six children, three sons and three daughters - all of whom survived Paul; at the time of his death, he also had 29 grandchildren.

== Legacy ==
Following his death in 1966, a totem pole, designed by his nephew, Benjamin Paul, was erected in the elder Paul's honour. It was unveiled in August 1969.

In 1978, the headdress Paul wore for his wrestling matches in the 1940s was donated to the BC Sports Hall of Fame.
