= Musgamagw Dzawadaʼenuxw Tribal Council =

First Nations tribal council in British Columbia, Canada

The Musgamagw Dzawadaʼenuxw Tribal Council, formerly Musgamagw Tsawataineuk, is a First Nations tribal council based in the Queen Charlotte Strait region around northern Vancouver Island in British Columbia, Canada.

The headquarters of the Musgamagw Dzawada'enuxw Tribal Council is in the community of Quinsam, British Columbia in Campbell River, but territories of the three member nations span the Mainland Inlets of the Broughton Archipelago just to the north of the mouth of Knight Inlet.

== Member governments ==
- Ḵwiḵwa̱sut'inux̱w Ha̱xwa'mis First Nation
- Dzawada̱ʼenux̱w First Nation
- Gwawaenuk Tribe

== See also ==
- Kwakwaka'wakw
- Kwak'wala (language)
- List of tribal councils in British Columbia
  - Winalagalis Treaty Group
  - Hamatla Treaty Society
  - Kwakiutl District Council
