= Kwiakah First Nation =

First Nation band government in British Columbia, Canada

- Band No. 628
- People: Kwakwaka'wakw
- Province: Vancouver Island, Discovery Islands, mainland British Columbia

Population
- On reserve: 7
- Off reserve: 14
- Total population: 21

Tribal Council
- Kwakiutl District Council

The Kwiakah First Nation, also known as the Kwiakah Band or Kwiakah Nation, is the band government of the Kwiakah (Kwexa) people, a subgroup of the Laich-kwil-tach (Euclataws or Southern Kwakiutl) group of the Kwakwaka'wakw peoples. Their mailing address is in Campbell River, British Columbia, Canada, where most of their 19 band members live, although their traditional territory is in the Discovery Islands to the north of that city and their two Indian Reserves are located on the mainland coast adjacent to that archipelago. The band is making an effort to "go back to the land" and re-occupy their traditional sites.

== Language ==
The traditional language of the Kwiakah people is Lekwala, the southern dialect of Kwak'wala, a Northern Wakashan language.

== Indian Reserves ==
Indian Reserves under the administration of the Kwiakah Band are:

- Matsayno Indian Reserve No. 5, 48 ha., on the east shore of Phillips Arm, which is to the north of East Thurlow Island.
- Saaiyouck Indian Reserve No. 6, 20.8 ha. on the mainland coast to the northwest of Stuart Island, two miles west of the Arran Rapids.

== Tribal council membership ==
They are a member government of the Kwakiutl District Council.

== BC Treaty Process ==
In the British Columbia Treaty Process They are part of the Hamatla Treaty Society. There are in Stage 4 of the BC Treaty Process.

With the Cape Mudge First Nation and the Campbell River First Nation, they also form the Laich-kwil-tach Council of Chiefs or Laich-kwil-tach Treaty Society.

== See also ==
- Pałəmin/Estero Basin Conservancy
- Phillips Estuary/ʔNacinuxʷ Conservancy
