= 2002 British Columbia Indigenous treaty referendum =

The BC Treaty Referendum was a province-wide referendum on First Nations treaty rights in British Columbia, Canada.

In the spring of 2002 the Premier Gordon Campbell and the British Columbia Liberal Party government sent out ballots to registered voters in the province.

35.84% of ballots (763,480) were received by Elections BC by the deadline of May 15. Over 80 per cent of those ballots indicated agreement with all eight principles. Between 55,000 and 60,000 votes on each question were rejected.

== Questions posed ==
The referendum proposed eight principles that voters were asked to either support or oppose:

1. Private property should not be expropriated for treaty settlements. (Yes/No)

2. The terms and conditions of leases and licences should be respected; fair compensation for unavoidable disruption of commercial interests should be ensured. (Yes/No)

3. Hunting, fishing and recreational opportunities on Crown land should be ensured for all British Columbians. (Yes/No)

4. Parks and protected areas should be maintained for the use and benefit of all British Columbians. (Yes/No)

5. Province-wide standards of resource management and environmental protection should continue to apply. (Yes/No)

6. Aboriginal self-government should have the characteristics of local government, with powers delegated from Canada and British Columbia. (Yes/No)

7. Treaties should include mechanisms for harmonizing land use planning between Aboriginal governments and neighbouring local governments. (Yes/No)

8. The existing tax exemptions for Aboriginal people should be phased out. (Yes/No)

Voters were also told that, for each principle, a Yes vote would compel the provincial government to adopt the principle in treaty negotiations, while a No vote would mean that the government was not bound to adopt the principle when taking part in treaty negotiations.

== Outcome ==
Critics claimed that the phrasing of the referendum ballot was flawed. For example, the first principle, being phrased in the negative, may have confused some voters about which answer meant support. The fourth was written in such a positive way that a Yes response was virtually guaranteed. The eighth may have been misleading, since the tax-exemption for Status Indians is provided by the federal Indian Act, and cannot be altered by provincial governments. The impact of the referendum on treaty negotiations was also unclear, since the government did not indicate what level of support for each principle would be enough to make it binding, or whether any of the principles might still be taken into account by the government even if they had been rejected by some or most voters.

The government called the referendum "an experiment in direct democracy," but a representative for the polling firm Angus Reid called it "one of the most amateurish, one-sided attempts to gauge the public will that I have seen in my professional career." Critics called for a boycott of the referendum and First Nations groups collected as many ballots as possible so that they might be destroyed publicly. The boycott was backed by the Anglican Church, the United Church, the Presbytery of New Westminster, the Canadian Jewish Congress, the Canadian Muslim Federation, the BC Federation of Labour, the Council of Senior Citizens and the David Suzuki Foundation.

35.84% of ballots (763,480) were received by Elections BC by the deadline of May 15. Over 80 per cent of those ballots indicated agreement with all eight principles. Between 55,000 and 60,000 votes on each question were rejected.

== See also ==
- Status of British Columbian First Nation Treaties
