= Malahat First Nation =

First Nations community in British Columbia, Canada

Malahat Nation
- Band No. 647
- MÁLEXEȽ
- People: W̱SÁNEĆ
- Treaty: Douglas Treaties
- Province: British Columbia

Land
- Main reserve: Malahat 11
- Reserve: Goldstream 13
- Land area: 2.479 km^{2} (0.957 sq mi)

Population (2024)
- On reserve: 151
- On other land: 54
- Off reserve: 165
- Total population: 370

Government
- Chief: Gordon Harry

Tribal Council
- Naut'sa mawt Tribal Council

Website
- malahatnation.com

Malahat First Nation (Saanich: MÁLEXEȽ [ˈmeləχəɬ] or MÁ¸LEXEȽ [ˈmeʔləχəɬ]) is a Coast Salish First Nations community of W̱SÁNEĆ (Saanich People) representing approximately 350 members with two reserve lands located on the western shore of Saanich Inlet, Vancouver Island in British Columbia, Canada. The Malahat First Nation is one of many nations within the Coastal Salish group that live on their traditional lands. The Coastal Salish are Indigenous to the Northwest mainland, coast, and islands. The Malahat First Nation is a member nation of the Naut'sa mawt Tribal Council and was the ninth First Nation in Canada to be certified by the First Nations Financial Management Board. The ancestral languages of Malahat Nation are Hul̓q̓umín̓um̓ and SENĆOŦEN . The Hul̓q̓umín̓um̓ or Halkomelem language is spoken in Washington State and British Columbia and is within the Coastal Salish language family. Currently it is being revitalized, as it is mainly spoken by elders in the community. The Chief of Malahat Nation is George Harry. George served on the council for four years before being elected as Chief on June 10, 2019.

The Malahat Nation inhabits land rich in natural resources and have throughout history and modern day made efforts to restore depleted species. Aside from their spiritual backgrounds supporting the respect of nature, many of their goals for their community involve strengthening their resources after years of overfishing, and being settled in the 18th through 20th centuries. They also participate in activism surrounding such environmental issues, as well as social issues. As with other Indigenous Canadian peoples and Nations, residential schools have been surging in new information and new initiatives to better understand and combat the effects. This particular community has also been hit hard during COVID-19, but have responded with health initiatives as well as economic driven solutions to the issues caused by COVID-19.

== Geography ==
=== Location ===
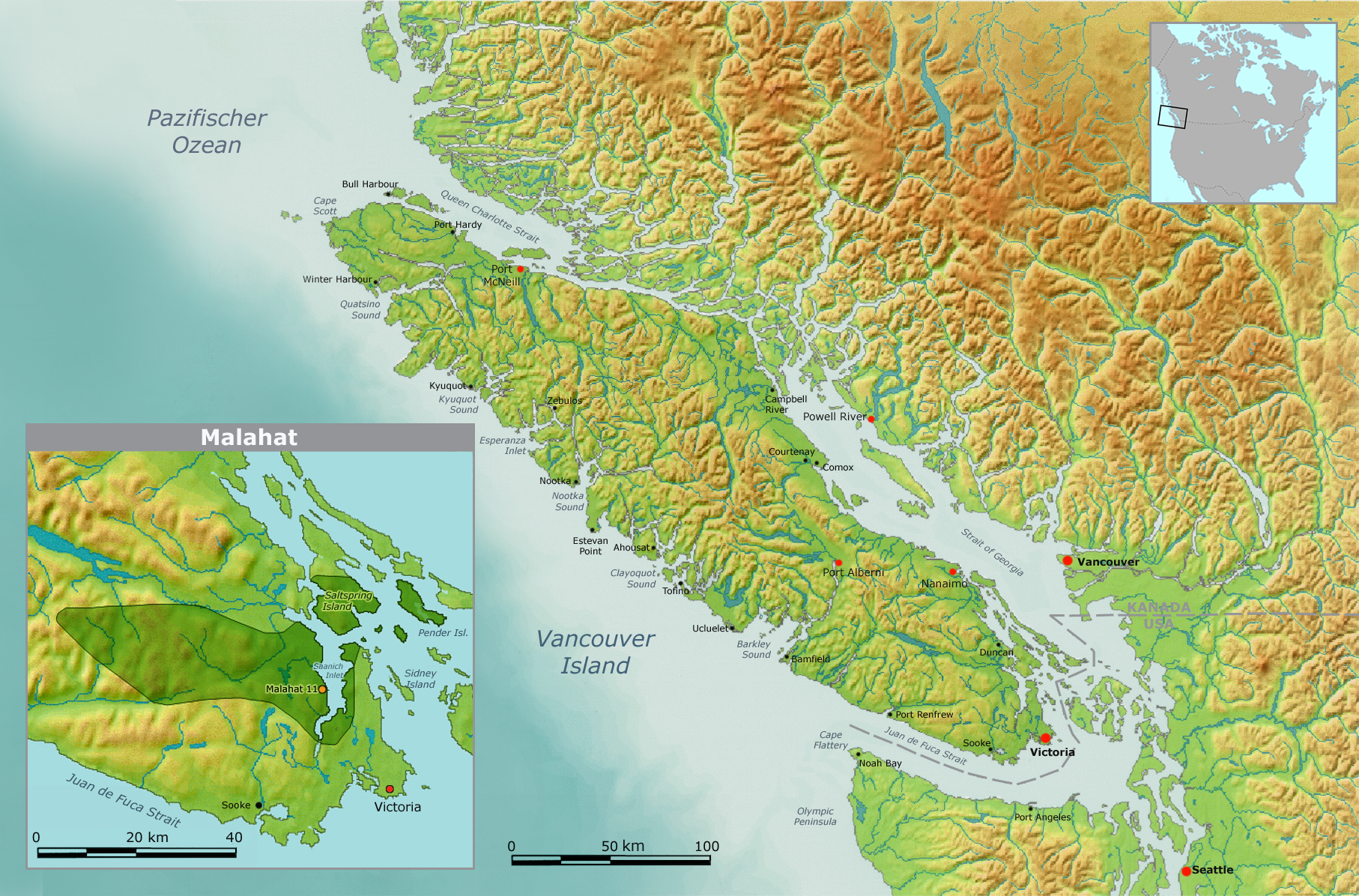
Malahat traditional territory

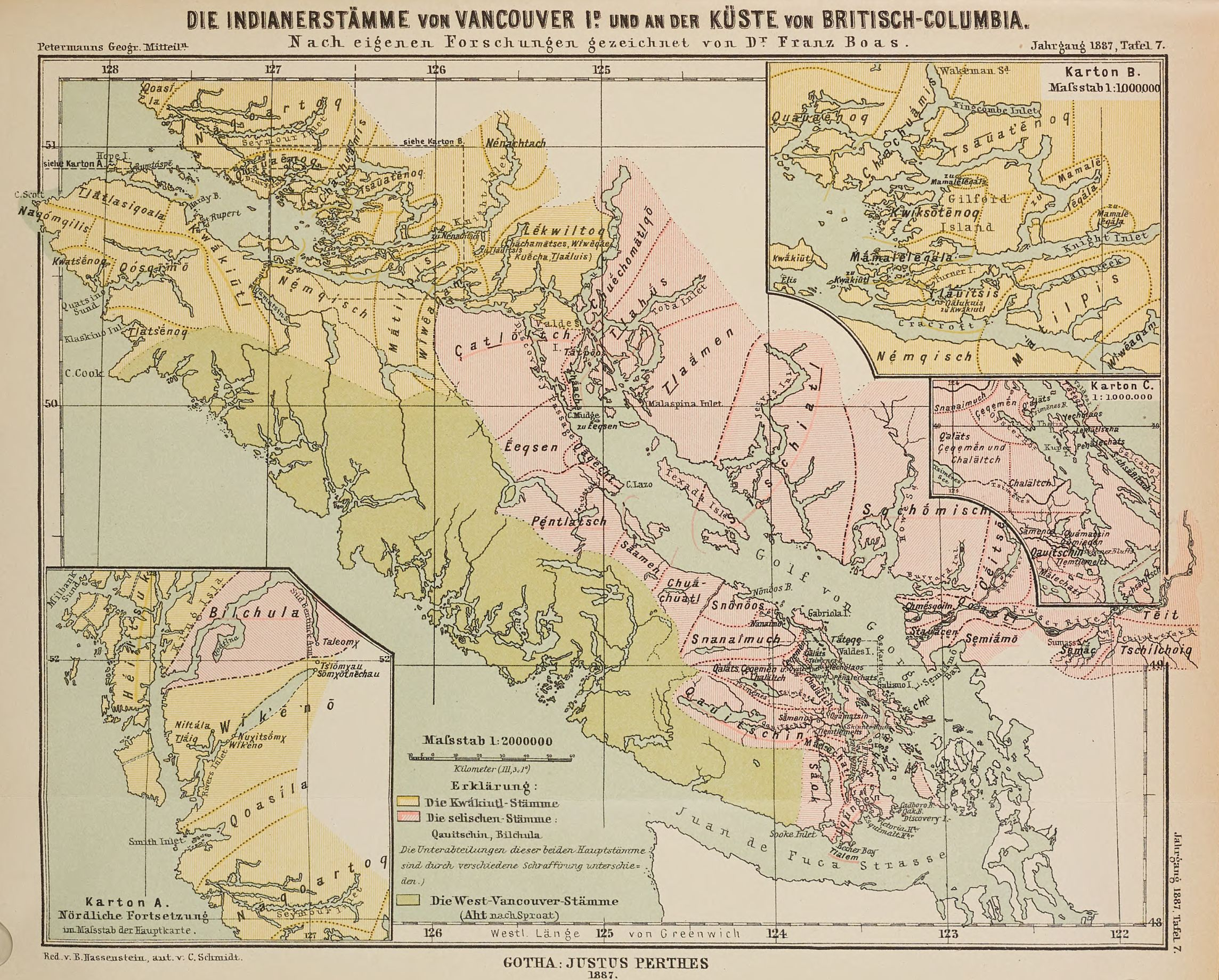
Dr. Franz Boas 1887 map showing Malahat territories

The Malahat live on Vancouver Island, off the coast of British Columbia. West of the Canadian coast, the environment of their homelands are defined by mountains, forests, rivers, waterfalls and an abundance of natural resources. In 2015, the Malahat Nation acquired a portion of their traditional homelands through a loan from the First Nations Finance Authority. This land purchase encompassed locations such as Bamberton and Oliphant Lake, while also tripling the amount of territory they own in total. Past Chief, Michael Harry has suggested that buying the land outright was much more efficient than being tied up in the courts for years over rightful ownership. This investment in the land will provide intergenerational wealth via housing, job opportunities, and as a potential tourist location.

=== Natural resources ===
These resources included sea-life, hunting, timber, and semi-precious metals/sedimentary rocks that could be mined. Materials from the forests have been used in the past by both colonial people and First Nations people. The western side of Vancouver, particularly in the south, there is also a better environment for agriculture. While the Malahat people favor developing their land for future generations, there are also conversations happening currently about fracking development. Due to the complex nature of drilling there is careful consideration when it comes to the impacts about their local environment, such as carbon pollution and an abundant uptick in the use of fresh water.

=== Environmental issues ===
In the last decade, salmon has been an important topic both in regards to being a staple in Indigenous resources, but also in environmental disasters and preservation. In 2011, a large amount of gasoline and diesel fuel spilled on the Malahat Highway which led to a leak into the Goldstream River. This resulted in thousands of fish dying and a response to clean up the surrounding area and dispose of contaminated fish. The gasoline was expected to degrade naturally and quickly, along with the concentrated efforts to protect the area. Years later, 2018, there were also plans to restore chinook salmon on the West Coast of Vancouver Island. These are the biggest species of salmon on the Pacific Coast, and in some areas are listed as endangered. While originally intended to be a deal between the Malahat Nation and Steelhead LNG, and built on Indigenous land, it has since been moved nearby on the Huu-ay-aht First Nations land. This effort will hopefully impact the reduced numbers of salmon and benefit all local Indigenous peoples.

== Cosmology and religion ==
The Malahat Nation comes from the Saanich people, who in turn are a smaller piece of Coast Salish peoples. While there are many variations of beliefs and histories of the Salish people, they often have common threads or underlying traits between them. In their cosmology, ties between humans and nature serve as their origin story and reasoning for why they are linked to their ancestral lands. Many of the stories have been passed down through oral history, and keeps the languages preserved through an effort to maintain a connection to their cosmology. For example, they have creation stories about mountains, deer, blue jays, as well as what happens when humans forget their obligations to nature. Spiritual or religious rituals that the early Salish people performed were coming of age rites that focus on boys, but were not exclusionary towards girls. These rituals, such as vision quests, would help young people forge a relationship with their personal guides.

== History ==
=== Pre-contact ===
Indigenous people have inhabited Vancouver Island for thousands of years, and particularly chose these sites because of the availability of resources. Early Coast Salish people relied heavily on hunting fish and mammals, and it is theorized that people living in internal British Columbia moved closer to the coast as it again provided ample food. Coast Salish people tended to live the summer season in semi-nomadic conditions to take advantage of their abundant resources. In the winter they resided in plank houses which were permanent fixtures of their lives. The social structure of Coast Salish people was based on households and each area was divided by these homes. In each home there could be not only immediate family but also those more distantly related. They would all live in one home and these homes would make up a small village, in the cases of permanent winter lodgings.

=== Post contact ===
As part of the Coast Salish group, the Malahat Nation would have made contact with Europeans in the 1700s. Through contact with settlers, Indigenous people across British Columbia were pushed out and off their traditional lands and lost great numbers to smallpox in the 1700s and the 1800s.

Treaties were also a key component of post-contact interactions with European and English settlers. In the mid 19th century, the Hudson Bay Company set out to establish their presence on Vancouver Island, which was named for George Vancouver. This was done by sending James Douglas onto Indigenous territories to set up treaties and acquire land. Treaties have greatly affected the inter-relations of Indigenous people and modern day nations recognized through western governments. The Douglas Treaties came at a time in which Coast Salish people believed that sharing and being generous were positive attributes. As a culture within that, it was common for Saanich people to have good relations with other groups in the area when it came to accessing resources and the movement across territories. In modern day, the rules of these treaties and others have impacted both how those who signed the treaties interact with each other as well as their non-Indigenous neighbors.

Residential schools are also important to the post-contact relationship between colonialism and Indigenous values. Vancouver Island had five residential schools, the earliest starting in 1890 and the latest closing in 1983. The lowest numbers of how many children died at these schools are 202, these numbers being reported in 2021. The history of these schools show how attempts to assimilate Indigenous children were met with resistance throughout their entire existence. This can be seen in the number of times the schools were rebuilt due to arson. Under new initiatives from the Canadian government, there is more willingness to discuss the sexual abuse, physical punishments, and politics behind these schools designed to re-educate and end Indigenous values in children.

== Culture ==
=== Art and repatriation ===
A large part of Indigenous cultures are their material objects or essentially their material culture. One of the effects of colonialism has been the acquirement of Indigenous objects and artifacts. In British Columbia, the government decided to allocate two million dollars toward repatriation via the Royal B.C. Museum. This effort will not only include repatriation of cultural objects but also the hiring of Indigenous professionals who will participate and guide the process. While the extent of these returns has yet to be determined, creating access to ancestral objects and heritage is one of the main goals of many communities. Another aspect of this partnership includes the attempt to get human remains returned. This is important to Indigenous communities because reburying the remains of their ancestors means completing ceremonies and life or death journeys that were cut short through being dug up and removed from Indigenous homelands. The Coast Salish nations are known for their nature inspired art and overall cosmologies that took root in the world around them.

=== Potlatches ===
Historically, potlatches were used by Coast Salish people, among others, to display and give away wealth. These events also served as a way to bring people together to discuss current issues or politics, determine rank, and display material culture. Typically a potlatch would include giving away as many goods as possible which by distributing wealth and behaving generously, would solidify a prominent member's social status among the group. These large events would also include a large meal and serve as a way to settle disagreements or internal feuds with competition, rather than violence.

== Government ==
Malahat is a First Nation which means that they were either the original people, or those who were present during the first European contact. The First Nation people are not Inuit or Métis, and is an umbrella term that groups together many people who identify as Indigenous to Canada, but might have more specific titles and names for their own community. First Nations are primarily under the Indian Act, rather than having self-governance which some Indigenous people have in Canada. This act has been in place since 1876, and grants some autonomy to have their own laws, but still limits their power in conjunction with the Canadian government. Some of the significant treaties that have been passed in British Columbia and Canada are the Te'mexw Treaty Association Agreement-in-Principle (2015), the Malahat Nation Incremental Treaty Agreement (2013), and the Douglas Treaties of 1850 and 1854. As of 2022, there is a new treaty that has reached stage 5 out of 6 between the Te'mexw Treaty Association and the Canadian government. The Te'mexw Treaty Association is made up of five Nations within the Coastal Salish group including, the Malahat, Snaw-aw-as, Songhees, T'sou-ke, and Scia'new. The Malahat Nation is also under a Chief system, or leadership, as currently it is led by Chief George Harry.

== Activism ==
=== Land rights and use ===
In the Malahat community, much like other Indigenous communities, there can be contention over how traditional lands are being used. This can pertain to both lands in possession by the Canadian government as well as those maintained by First Nations and other Indigenous peoples. Working in conjunction with environmental groups, people in the Southwest of British Columbia have been proactive and vocal about pipelines and industrial construction on their homelands. As well as pipelines, the overuse of lumber generated protests from Indigenous peoples, including the Malahat in 2021. The protests surrounded Fairy Creek and concerned the removal of thousands of years old trees. The main issues at hand were the desire to save the trees and to allow for First Nation leaders to come up with plans on how to navigate and negotiate with the logging companies. While pointing at larger issues, this fight against climate change and rights surrounding traditional forests resulted in the arrest of 800 people.

=== Residential schools ===
In 2021, with the recent discoveries of mass residential school graves, the Malahat Nation organized an event to both protest past treatment and to honor the lives of those lost to residential schools. During this event, a march took place consisting of the Malahat Nation, neighboring nations, and non-Indigenous allies. As a result, the Malahat Nation are hopeful for unity against past treatment, and are currently commissioning totem poles to recognize the legacy of those who died at and survived the residential schools.

== COVID-19 ==
COVID-19 has led to significant changes and impacts on Indigenous communities over the course of a few years. The Malahat Nation is adapting to these new circumstances by focusing on community projects that enrich their economy. They have been working on the Malahat Skywalk, which has been under construction over the COVID-19 pandemic after it was assessed to be safe to continue and health precautions will be followed. While many Indigenous communities have struggled over COVID-19, there is a push to provide both sanitary products and information. This project will transform the forest treetops into a tourist destination measuring 650 metres long. Guests will be able to walk through nature and then ascend to a spiral lookout of the Malahat lands.

== See also ==
- Malahat
