= We Wai Kai Nation =

First Nation on Quadra Island, British Columbia, Canada

- Band No. 623
- People: Laich-kwil-tach
- Headquarters: Campbell River
- Province: British Columbia

Population (2025)
- On reserve: 333
- On other land: 44
- Off reserve: 953
- Total population: 1330

Government
- Chief: Ronnie Chickite
- Council: List: Nicole Assu; Jonathan Chickite; Samantha Chickite; Kim Duncan; Cindy Inrig; Merci Lewis; Art Wilson; Cameron McArthur

Tribal Council
- Laich-Kwil-Tach Treaty Society

Website
- wewaikai.com

The We Wai Kai Nation, also known as the Cape Mudge First Nation, is the band government of the We Wai Kai subgroup of the Laich-kwil-tach (Kwak'wala: Liǧʷiłdaxʷ) group of the Kwakwaka'wakw peoples, based on Quadra Island offshore from Campbell River, British Columbia, Canada, which is on the east coast of Vancouver Island at the northern end of the Strait of Georgia. The Laich-kwil-tach include the Wei Wai Kum, who are organized as the Campbell River First Nation, and the Kwiakah Nation, whose traditional territory is in the Discovery Islands to the northeast of that city and on the adjoining mainland coast. All three are part of the Kwakiutl District Council, a tribal council which includes other Kwakwaka'wakw bands farther northwest in the Queen Charlotte Strait region and on northern Vancouver Island.

== Indian Reserves ==
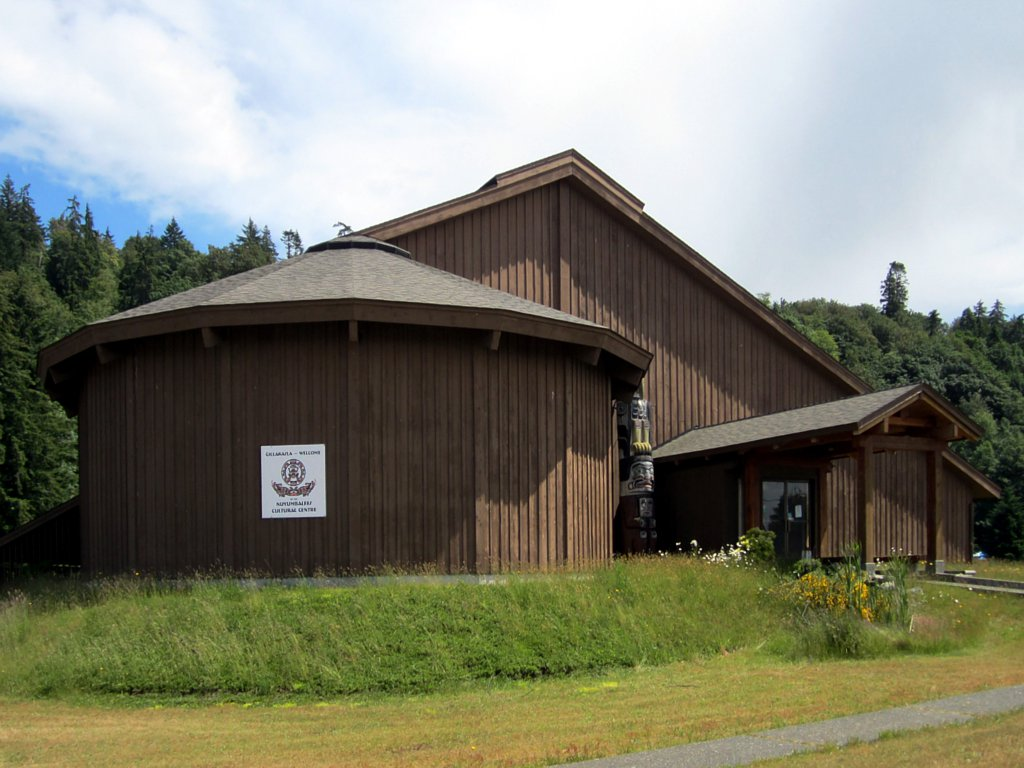
The Nuyumbalees Cultural Centre at Cape Mudge 10

Indian Reserves under the band's administration are:

- Village Bay Indian Reserve No. 7, 4.11 ha. in size, uninhabited (east coast of Quadra Island)
- Open Bay Indian Reserve No. 8, 5.2 ha. in size, uninhabited (east coast of Quadra Island)
- Drew Harbour Indian Reserve No. 9, 96.6 ha. in size; site of the We Wai Kai Campsite, a band-run business (east side of Quadra Island; also the site for the We Wai Kai Scallop Farm which is located in Suitl Channel.
- Cape Mudge Indian Reserve No. 10, 458 ha. Site of the band-run businesses and services: the Tsa-Kwa-Luten Lodge, the Boatworks, the Nuyumbalees Culture Centre (formerly the Kwaguith Museum), the Band Administration Office, pre-school/daycare and approximately 65 homes for the Nations citizens and their families.
- Quinsam Indian Reserve No. 12, 121 ha. Site of 121 hectares in size. Over 100 residential homes for their citizens and a 43-acre economic development zone. The Quinsam Reserve also is the site of several businesses and services: a Shell gas station, Lee's Famous Ribs and Chicken, the Quinsam Liquor Store, the administration offices of the We Wai Kai Nation, the KDC Kwakiuth District Council, The Cape Mudge Band Learning Centre, the offices of the Aboriginal Headstart Program, and the Quinsam Wellness Centre.

== Chief and councillors ==
As of November 2026

- Chief Councillor - Ronnie Chickite
- Councillor - Cameron McArthur
- Councillor - Nicole Assu
- Councillor - Merci Lewis
- Councillor - Jonathan Chickite
- Councillor - Samantha Chickite
- Councillor - Kim Duncan
- Councillor - Cindy Inrig
- Councillor - Art Wilson

== British Columbia Treaty Process ==
They are a member government of the negotiating group for the BC Treaty Process known as the Hamatla Treaty Society, and are also constituted for treaty negotiation purposes as the Laich-kwil-tach Council of Chiefs.The treaty society members are in Stage 4 of the BC Treaty Process.

== Demographics ==
The We Wai Kai Nation has 1329 registered members, living both on and off reserve.

== Notable We Wai Kai Nation people ==
- Sonny Assu, interdisciplinary artist
- Jody Wilson-Raybould, Regional Chief of the BC Assembly of First Nations, Minister of Justice and Attorney General of Canada from 2015 to 2019
- Chief Billy Assu
- Tanille Johnston, city councillor in Campbell River, British Columbia, candidate in the 2026 New Democratic Party leadership election
