= Hamatla Treaty Society =

Group of three First Nations band governments in British Columbia, Canada

The Hamatla Treaty Society handles Treaty negotiations in the BC Treaty Process for a number of First Nations located in the northern Strait of Georgia of British Columbia.

== Membership ==
- Campbell River Indian Band (We Wai Kum Nation)
- Cape Mudge Indian Band (We Wai Kai Nation)
- Kwiakah First Nation

== Treaty Process ==
The Hamatla Treaty Society entered the treaty process in February 1997, reaching as far as Stage 4 in the BC Treaty Process. However, in the Fall of 2003, negotiations stalled after it became apparent that the five member bands needed time to resolve internal issues. Former member the Tlowitsis Tribe left the society to independently continue negotiations and former member K'omoks First Nation also left to independently continue negotiations.

First Nation	ID #	Population
Campbell River Indian Band (We Wai Kum Nation)	622	665
Cape Mudge Indian Band (We Wai Kai Nation)	623	924
Kwiakah First Nations	628	19

== See also ==
- Status of First Nations treaties in British Columbia
- List of tribal councils in British Columbia
  - Winalagalis Treaty Group
  - Kwakiutl District Council
  - Musgamagw Dzawadaʼenuxw Tribal Council
