= Scia'new First Nation =

First Nations band government

Scia'new Nation
- Band No. 640
- SCʼIȺNEW
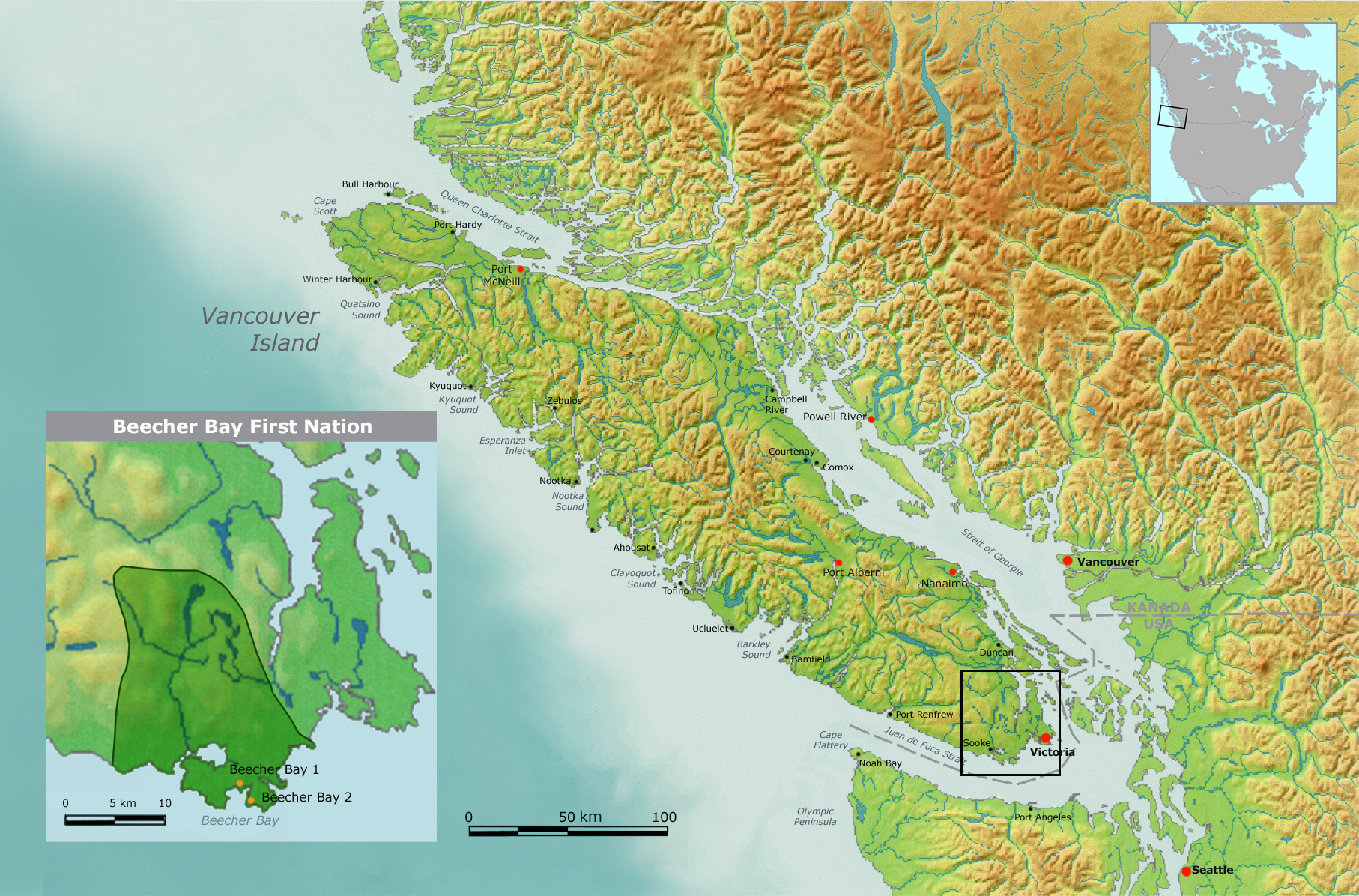
- Scia'new Nation traditional territory
- People: Coast Salish
- Treaty: Douglas Treaties
- Headquarters: Sooke
- Province: British Columbia

Land
- Main reserve: Becher Bay 1
- Reserves: List: Becher Bay 2; Fraser Island 6; Lamb Island 5; Long Neck Island 9; Twin Island 10; Village Island 7; Whale Island 8
- Land area: 307.7 km^{2} (118.8 sq mi)

Population (2024)
- On reserve: 103
- On other land: 12
- Off reserve: 159
- Total population: 274

Government
- Chief: Russ Chipps
- Council: Traci Pateman; Sheeba Sawyer

Tribal Council
- Te'mexw Treaty Association

Website
- scianew.com

Scia'new Nation (in Saanich SCʼIȺNEW, anglicized as Sciaʼnew or Scʼianew) and also known as Beecher Bay First Nation is a band government of First Nations people in British Columbia. Beecher Bay lands are located on southern Vancouver Island in southwestern British Columbia, Canada and include Beecher Bay (also known as Becher Bay), Fraser Island, Lamb Island, Long-neck Island, Twin Island, Village Island, and Whale Island.

The Scia'new were party to the 1850-1854 Douglas Treaties and are negotiating an updated treaty as a member of the Te'mexw Treaty Association along with the Malahat, Nanoose, Songhees, and T'Sou-ke Nations. Scia'new Nation has a population of 261 as of March 2020.

== Languages ==
The group recognizes four ancestral languages though not all are currently spoken. The name "SCʼIȺNEW" comes from the Klallam word for Beecher Bay, "xʷčiyánəxʷ." It is translated as "the place of the big fish," literally "salmon place" from xʷ- 'location' and √č⟨iy⟩ánnəxʷ 'salmon'. The name is W̱ĆIYÁNEW̱ (also variously ĆIYÁNEW̱) in the Saanich dialect of Northern Straits, and is derived from the Klallam name.
