= Nautʼsa mawt Tribal Council =

First Nations Tribal Council

Nautʼsa mawt Tribal Council (in orthography, nucʼamʼat or nəc̕amat 'unity') is a First Nations tribal council located in British Columbia, Canada, with offices in Tsawwassen and Nanaimo. NmTC advises and assists its 11-member Nations in the areas of community planning, economic development, financial management, governance and technical services (which includes community infrastructure, capital projects, housing development and inspections, water quality and emergency preparedness). NmTC is also actively involved in fostering dialogue and understanding between its members and their neighbouring communities.

The member Nations of the region span the Strait of Georgia, touch the Strait of Juan de Fuca and encompass eastern and southern Vancouver Island, the Lower Mainland and the Sunshine Coast.

The head office of the Tribal Council is on Snuneymuxw First Nation lands in Nanaimo. A mainland office is located on Tsawwassen First Nation lands near the Tsawwassen area of the city of Delta.

== Member governments ==
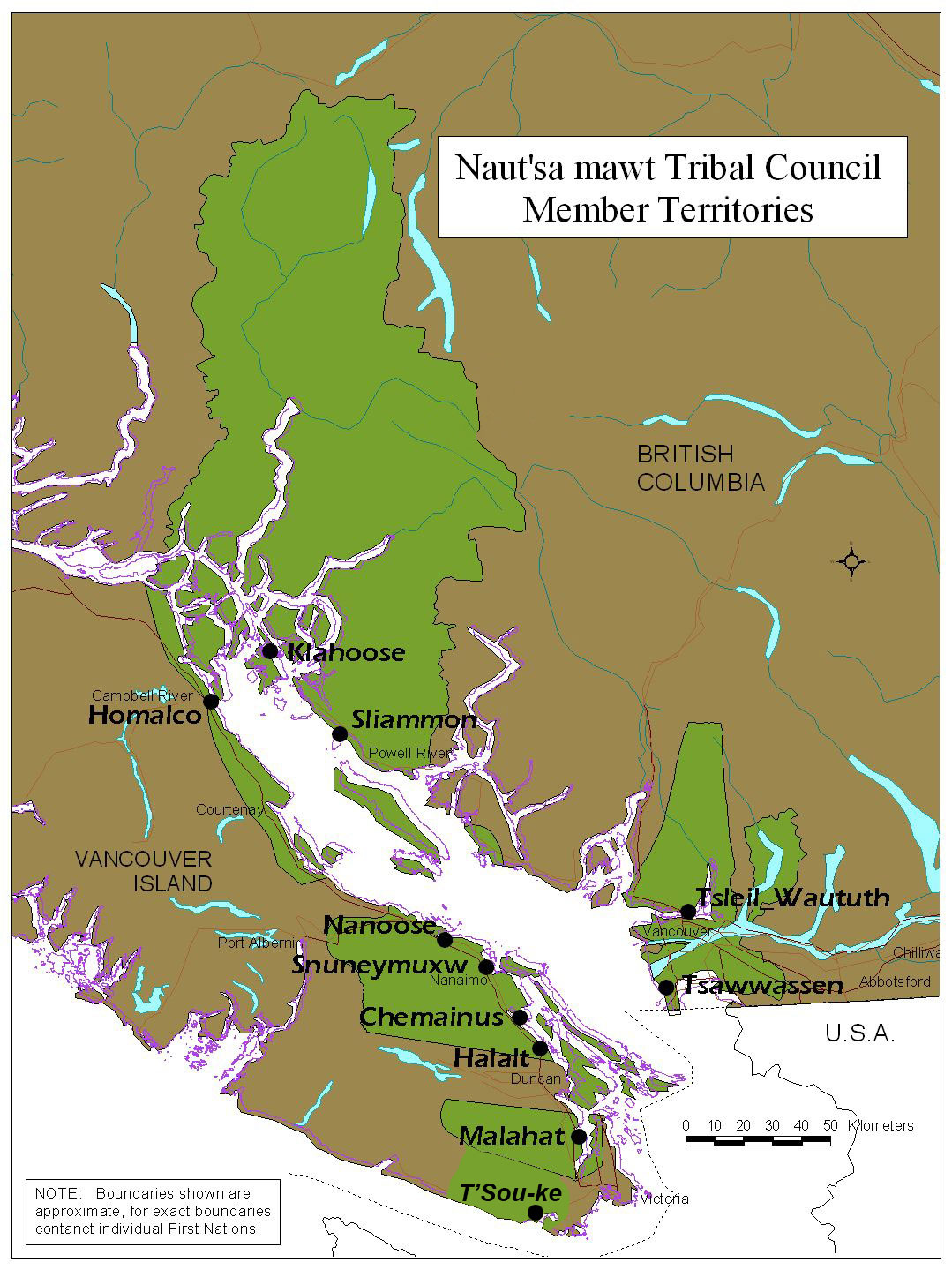
Territories and locations of Nautʼsa mawt Member Nations

- Halalt First Nation, Crofton, BC
- Homalco First Nation, Campbell River, BC
- Kʼómoks First Nation, Comox Valley, BC
- Klahoose First Nation, Cortes Island, BC
- Malahat First Nation, Mill Bay, BC
- Nanoose First Nation, Lantzville, BC
- Sliammon First Nation, Powell River, BC
- Snuneymuxw First Nation, Nanaimo, BC
- Stzʼuminus First Nation, Ladysmith, BC
- Tsawwassen First Nation, Tsawwassen, BC
- Tsleil-Waututh First Nation, North Vancouver, BC
- T'sou-ke First Nation, Sooke, BC

== Board of directors ==
In 2012-13 the Tribal Council Board is composed of:

=== Executive ===
- Doug White, Snuneymuxw First Nation - Chair
- Terry Sampson, Stzʼuminus First Nation - Vice-Chair
- Gordon Planes, T'Sou-ke First Nation - Secretary Treasurer

=== Other Directors ===
- Bryce Williams, Tsawwassen First Nation
- Lawrence Mitchell, Nanoose First Nation
- Russell Harry, Malahat First Nation
- James Delorme, Klahoose First Nation
- James Thomas, Halalt First Nation
- Carleen Thomas, Tsleil-Waututh First Nation
- Bill Blaney, Homalco First Nation
- Walter Paul, Sliammon First Nation

== Klahowya online newspaper ==
NmTC publishes an online newspaper, Klahowya - the voice of the member nations of the Nautʼsa mawt Tribal Council.

== See also ==
- Coast Salish peoples
- Halkomelem (language)
- Comox language
- Squamish language
- North Straits Salish
- Teʼmexw Treaty Association
- List of tribal councils in British Columbia
