= Laich-kwil-tach =

Indigenous people of Canada

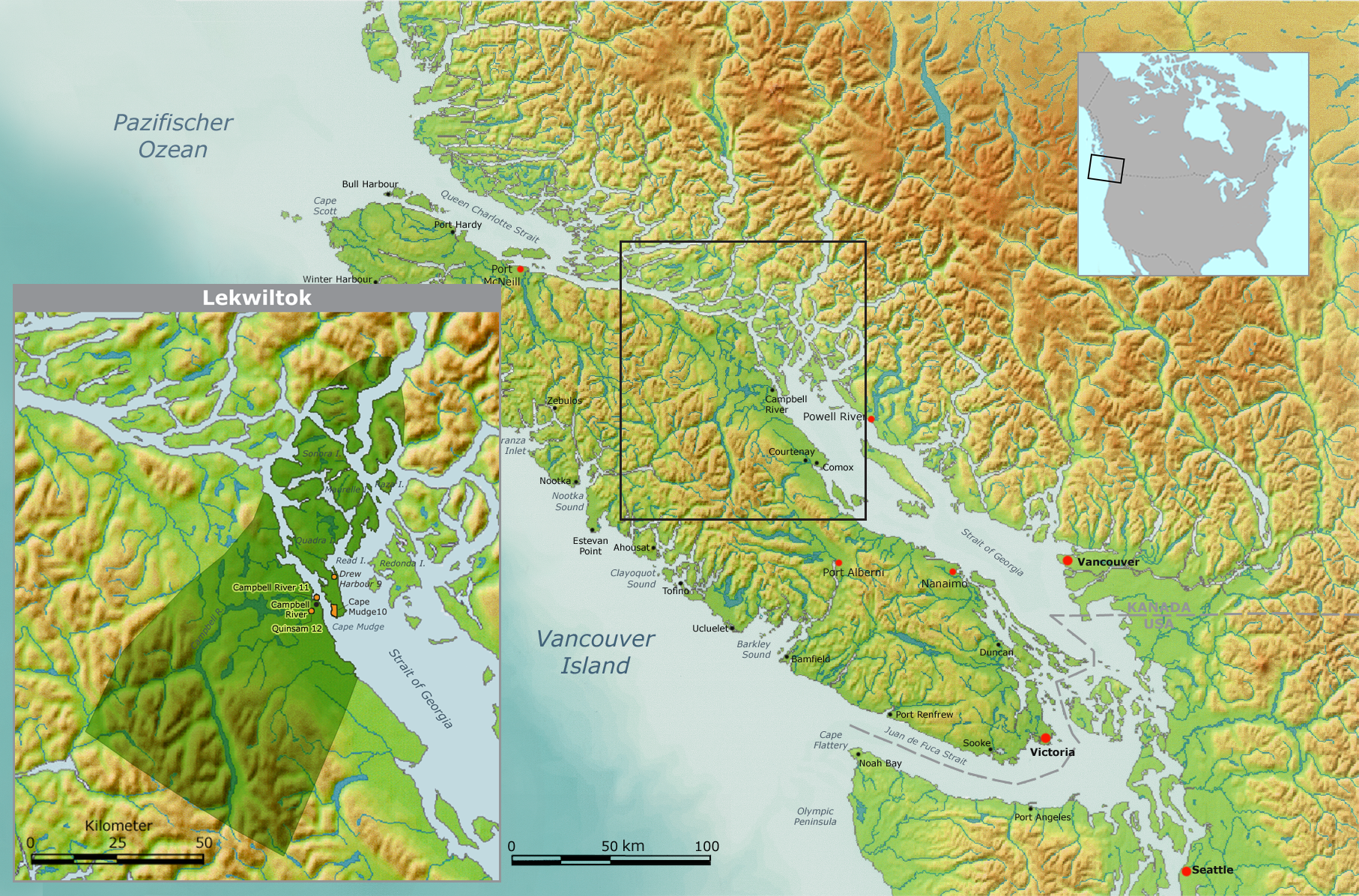
Laich-kwil-tach

Laich-kwil-tach (Kwak'wala: Liǧʷiłdaxʷ) are a southern Kwakʼwala-speaking people of Quadra Island and Campbell River in British Columbia, Canada. Today, there are two main groups (of ~5 original groups): the Wei Wai Kai (Cape Mudge Band) on Quadra Island, and the Wei Wai Kum (Campbell River Band) on Vancouver Island. In addition to these two main groups there are: the Kwiakah (Kwiakah Band / Kwiakah First Nation) originally from Phillips Arm, Frederick Arm, and the Discovery Islands; the Tlowitsis (ƛaʔaluis) between Bute and Loughborough Inlets—after a great war between the Kwakiutl and the Salish peoples they were so reduced in numbers that they joined the Kwiakah—; and the Walitsima / Walitsum Band of Salmon River (also called Hahamatses or Salmon River Band).

So great was the power of the Southern Kwakiutl that the Kʼómoks people of the Courtenay-Comox came to speak Kwakʼwala instead of Comox, which today remains spoken by their kin the Tla'amin and Homalco Nations on the other side of Georgia Strait around Powell River. Many of the Wewaykum in Campbell River are of Kʼómoks descent, while the Weewaikai of the Cape Mudge Band retain noble lineages and ceremonies going back centuries to their roots in the Queen Charlotte Strait. The great potlatches of the Cape Mudge chiefs are celebrated in the book Chiefly Feasts: The Enduring Kwakiutl Potlatch (A. Donaitis, U. Wash Press).

The Southern Kwakiutl remain politically separate from their distant kin, the Kwakwakaʼwakw, whose name means speakers of Kwakʼwala who remained in the Queen Charlotte Strait. The Kwaguʼł or Northern Kwakiutl of Fort Rupert are more closely allied and related to the Southern Kwakiutl than are the Kwakwakaʼwakw. The term "Kwakiutl" has different political and historical associations with each of these groups, and has associations with one band in particular over all others, which is one reason why Kwakwakaʼwakw evolved as the collective name for the main group of Queen Charlotte Strait Kwakʼwala-speakers. The Southern Kwakiutl have always called themselves Laich-kwil-tach, at least since moving into the Georgia Strait.

Laich-kwil-tach raids on the southern Georgia Strait, Puget Sound, and even up the Fraser River and out into the Strait of Juan de Fuca, and northwards, are described in the annals of the early non-First Nations explorers and traders. There was one notable incident shortly after the founding of Fort Langley in which the Hudson's Bay Company (HBC) staff repelled a siege by the Euclataws (i.e. the Laich-kwil-tach) with cannonades (much earning the appreciation of the beleaguered local Kwantlens). Despite the presence of Fort Langley the Laich-kwil-tach continued to raid other Sto:lo communities farther up the river.

== Notable Liǧʷiłdaxʷ people ==
- Sonny Assu, interdisciplinary artist
- Chief Billy Assu

== See also ==
- Kwakwakaʼwakw mythology
