= Te'mexw Treaty Association =

The Te'mexw Treaty Association (from Halkomelem /tə́məxʷ/ 'land, earth') handles Treaty negotiations in the BC Treaty Process for a number of First Nations located in the northern Strait of Georgia of British Columbia. The members of the association are former signatories of the Douglas Treaties, a group of treaties signed in the 1850s.

== Treaty Process ==
The Treaty group has reached Stage 5 in the BC Treaty Process.

== Membership ==
First Nation	ID #	Population
Becher Bay Indian Band (Scʼiⱥnew First Nation)	640	237
Malahat First Nation	647	262
Nanoose First Nation (Snaw-naw-AS First Nation)	649	223
Songhees First Nation	656	507
T'sou-ke Nation	657	221

== See also ==
- List of tribal councils in British Columbia
