= Tsartlip First Nation =

First Nation on Vancouver Island, Canada

Tsartlip
- Band No. 653
- W̱JOȽEȽP
- People: W̱SÁNEĆ
- Treaty: Douglas Treaties
- Headquarters: Brentwood Bay
- Province: British Columbia

Land
- Main reserve: South Saanich 1
- Reserves: Goldstream 13; Mayne Island 6; Seaus Island 10
- Land area: 3.3 km^{2} (1.3 sq mi)

Population (2024)
- On reserve: 540
- On other land: 121
- Off reserve: 407
- Total population: 1068

Government
- Chief: Don Tom

Website
- tsartlip.com

Tsartlip First Nation is a First Nation located on the Saanich Peninsula, in Saanich territory on Vancouver Island. They are a member of the Sencot'en Alliance fighting for Native rights. In the 1850s, they were signatories to one of the Douglas Treaties.

The band's reserve and offices are located near and to the north of the town of Brentwood Bay.

== Past Chiefs ==
Position	Name	Term start	Term end	Reference
Chief	Don Tom	12/08/2021	12/07/2025	
Chief	Ivan Morris	12/08/2011	12/07/2013	
Chief	Wayne Morris	12/07/2007	12/06/2009	

== Treaty Process ==
Not participating in BC Treaty Process.

== Demographics ==
As of December 2024, Tsartlip has 1,068 registered members, 540 of whom live on reserve, with 528 living off reserve or on other crown land.

== Notable Tsartlip ==
- Adam Olsen, BC MLA for Saanich North and the Islands
- Jean Baptiste Paul, also known as Chief Thunderbird, 20th-century wrestler
