= Hulʼqumiʼnum Treaty Group =

The Hulʼqumiʼnum Treaty Group was founded in 1993 to negotiate a treaty with the Province of British Columbia and Government of Canada. The organization is based in Duncan, British Columbia. Hulʼqumiʼnum Treaty Group is currently in Stage 5 of the treaty process.

== Members ==
The group is made up of close to 6500 members from the following First Nations:

- Cowichan Tribes
- Halalt First Nation
- Lake Cowichan First Nation (now Tsʼuubaa-asatx Nation)
- Lyackson First Nation
- Penelakut Tribe

== Publications & Work ==
In the process of treaty negotiations, a great deal of research has been carried out by the Hulʼqumiʼnum Treaty Group. Though much of the research remains confidential subject to treaty negotiations, many of the products of these projects can be shared with all. These include projects, reports, annual reports, guides, and other publications.
