= Stzʼuminus First Nation =

First Nation in British Columbia, Canada

- Band No. 641
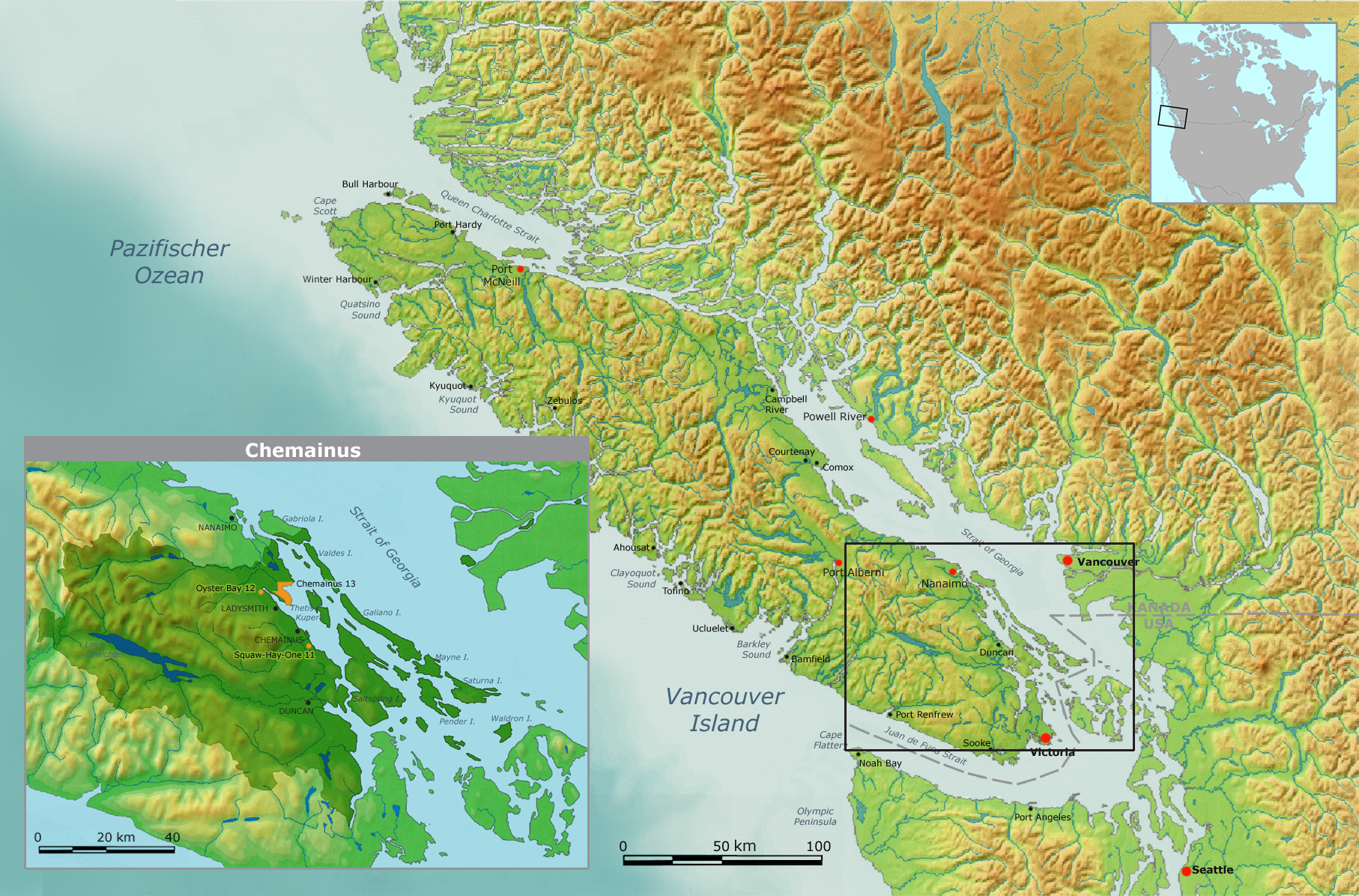
- traditional territory claimed by the Chemainus First Nation
- People: Coast Salish
- Headquarters: Ladysmith
- Province: British Columbia

Land
- Main reserve: Chemainus 13
- Reserves: Say-la-quas 10; Sqaw-hay-one 11; Oyster Bay 12
- Land area: 12.7 km^{2} (4.9 sq mi)

Population (2025)
- On reserve: 733
- On other land: 129
- Off reserve: 595
- Total population: 1457

Government
- Chief: John Elliott

Tribal Council
- Nautʼsa mawt Tribal Council

Website
- www.stzuminus.com

Stzʼuminus First Nation (in Halkomelem, shcʼumʼínus or šc̕əmínəs; formerly known as the Chemainus Indian Band and Chemainus First Nation) is a First Nations government located in southeastern Vancouver Island, British Columbia, Canada, near the town of Ladysmith, British Columbia. Stzʼuminus First Nation is a member government of the Naut'sa mawt Tribal Council. In early 2009, chief and council unanimously passed a band council resolution to officially change the name from Chemainus to Stzʼuminus in order to reflect its original Hul'qumi'num language name.

== "Salish Sea" ==
In March 2008, Stzʼuminus First Nation representative George Harris proposed renaming the nearby Strait of Georgia as the Salish Sea, an idea that reportedly met with approval by B.C.'s Aboriginal Relations Minister Mike de Jong, who pledged to put it before the B.C. cabinet for discussion. Renaming would require a formal application to the Geographical Names Board of Canada. The name was formally adopted as of the Throne Speech opening the BC Legislature on February 9, 2010.

The Salish Sea name has been used by the Coast Salish Gathering, a trans-boundary organization of Coast Salish leaders, since 2007. Stzʼuminus First Nation's largest Indian reserve, Chemainus Indian Reserve No. 13, is located on Stuart Channel, which is one of the countless smaller waterways within the Salish Sea as defined.

The Salish Sea name was originally proposed by Bert Webber from Bellingham, Washington in March, 1989, for the Strait of Georgia, Puget Sound and the Strait of Juan de Fuca and all adjoining waters.

== See also ==
- Hulqʼumiʼnum (language)
- Nautʼsa mawt Tribal Council
