= Quatsino First Nation =

First Nations band government in British Columbia, Canada

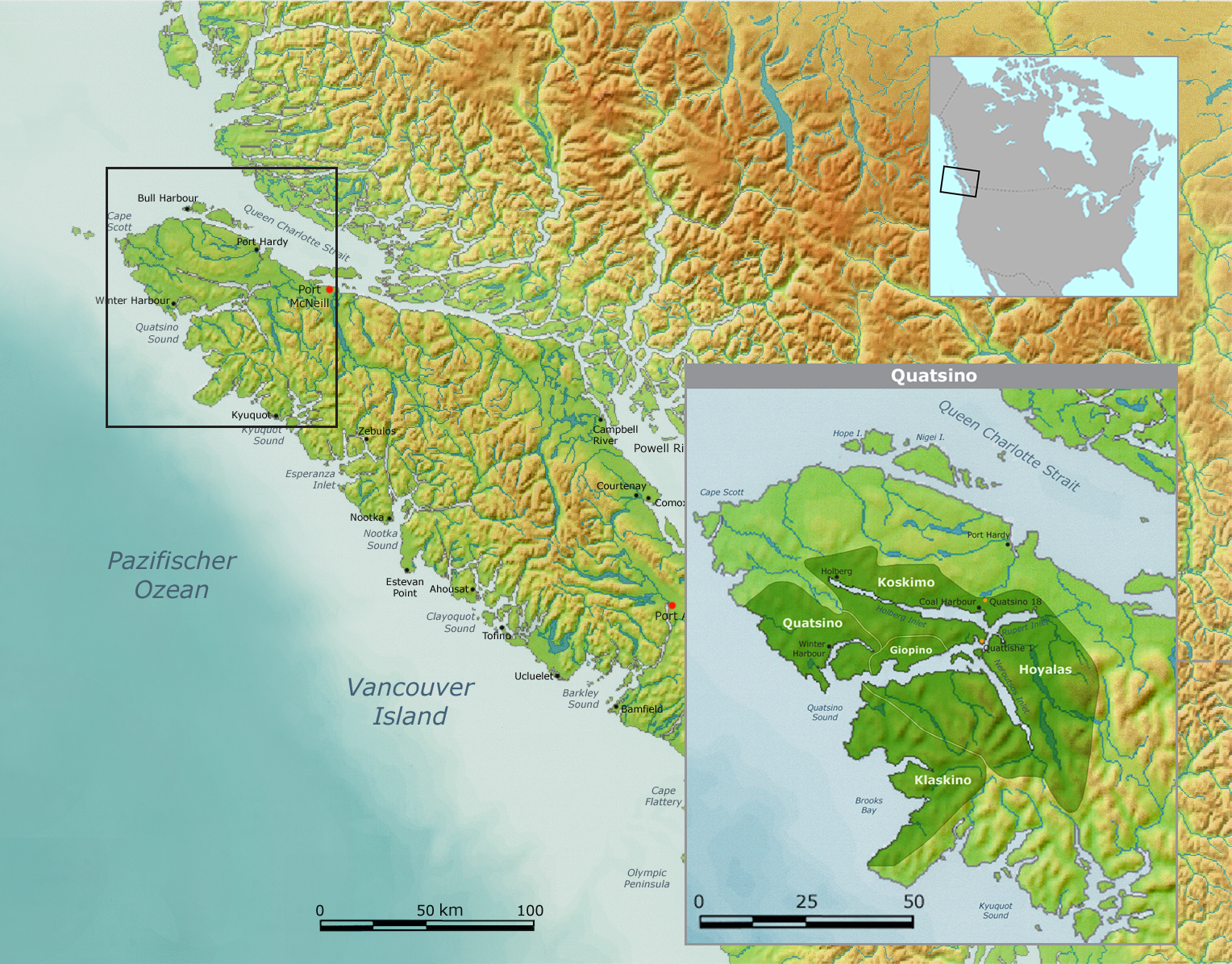
Quatsino First Nation

The Quatsino First Nation is the First Nations band government of the Gwat'sinux subgroup of the Kwakwaka'wakw peoples, based in the Quatsino Sound region on the west coast of northern Vancouver Island in British Columbia, Canada, focused on the community of Coal Harbour in Quatsino Sound. It is a member of the Kwakiutl District Council and, for treaty negotiation purposes, the Winalagalis Treaty Group which includes three other members of the Kwakiutl District Council (the Da'naxda'xw Awaetlatla Nation, Gwa'Sala-Nakwaxda'xw Nation, and the Tlatlasikwala Nation.

The band's reserve lands include Kultah 4, which is on the east shore of the north end of Quatsino Narrows.

== See also ==
- Kwak'wala (language)
