= Da̱ʼnaxdaʼx̱w/A̱waetla̱tla̱ First Nation =

First Nation in British Columbia, Canada

The Da̱ʼnaxdaʼx̱w Nation, or Da̱ʼnaxdaʼx̱w/A̱waetla̱tla̱ First Nation, is a First Nation government in northern Vancouver Island in British Columbia, Canada, their main community is the community of Alert Bay, British Columbia in the Queen Charlotte Strait region. There are approximately 225 members of the Daʼnaxdaʼxw Nation. The Nation is a member of the Kwakiutl District Council and, for treaty negotiation purposes, the Winalagalis Treaty Group which includes three other members of the Kwakiutl District Council (the Quatsino First Nation, the Gwa'Sala-Nakwaxda'xw Nation, and the Tlatlasikwala Nation.

The Daʼnaxdaʼxw Aweatlata Nation were formerly known as the Tanakteuk First Nation (Tanakteuk is a different anglicization of Daʼnaxdaʼxw).

As of January 2019 the Daʼnaxdaʼxw Nation had no treaty with the Government of Canada or the government of British Columbia, however the nation is in stage 4 of 6 of Principle negotiations with the government of British Columbia. Previous agreements have been reached with the government of British Columbia including forestry and reconciliation agreements.

== Notable people of Da'naxda'xw/Awaetlatla heritage ==
- Rainbow Eyes (Angela Davidson), Ooh-mah Ah-nise (Deputy Leader) of the Green Party of Canada
- Tanaya Beatty, actress

== See also ==
- Alert Bay, British Columbia
- Kwakwaka'wakw
- Kwak'wala (language)
