= Tlatlasikwala Nation =

First Nations band government in Canada

The Tlatlasikwala Nation is a First Nations band government based on northern Vancouver Island in British Columbia, Canada, focused on the community of Port Hardy, British Columbia in the Queen Charlotte Strait region. It is a member of the Kwakiutl District Council and, for treaty negotiation purposes, the Winalagalis Treaty Group which includes three other members of the Kwakiutl District Council (the Quatsino First Nation, the Da'naxda'xw Awaetlatla Nation, and the Gwa'Sala-'Nakwaxda'xw Nation.

== See also ==
- Port Hardy, British Columbia
- Kwakwaka'wakw
- Kwak'wala (language)
