= Sencot'en Alliance =

First Nations grouping

The Sencot'en Alliance is a First Nations grouping, composed of the Tsartlip, Tsawout, Pauquachin bands from the Saanich Peninsula and the Semiahmoo from White Rock. "Sencot'en" (the language spoken by the Saanich First Nations people) is equivalent to "Saanich" in ethnographic terms.

== Claim ==
The Alliance claims Greater Victoria, the southern half of the Gulf Islands, the San Juan Islands, Point Roberts and the adjacent mainland area up to the Coquitlam River and the whole of the area south of the Fraser River through to Seattle.

== Member governments ==
| First Nation | Population | Reference |
|---|---|---|
| Pauquachin | 373 | |
| Semiahmoo | 81 | |
| Tsartlip | 825 | |
| Tsawout | 764 | |
