= Northern Regional Negotiations Table =

The Northern Regional Negotiations Table handles treaty negotiations in the British Columbia Treaty Process for a number of First Nations located in the far north of British Columbia and the south of the Yukon Territory in Canada.

== Membership ==
- Carcross/Tagish First Nation
- Champagne and Aishihik First Nations
- Taku River Tlingit First Nation
- Teslin Tlingit Council

== Treaty Process ==
All of the members are based in Yukon except for the Taku River Tlingit First Nation. Members of the Northern Regional Negotiations Table entered the British Columbia Treaty Process because some of their traditional territories lie within British Columbia's provincial boundaries.

First Nation	Population	Treaty Status
Carcross/Tagish First Nation	609	Entered the B.C. treaty process in 1997. Signed an agreement between Yukon and Canada in 2005.
Champagne and Aishihik First Nations	507	Entered the B.C. treaty process in December 1993 after they had signed their Yukon agreement with Canada.
Taku River Tlingit First Nation	371	Entered the B.C. treaty process in December 1993 and are presently at Stage 4. They are the only B.C.-based first nation at this table and are not negotiating an agreement with Yukon and Canada.
Teslin Tlingit Council	559	Entered the B.C. treaty process in 1994 after they had signed their Yukon agreement with Canada.
