= Ts'uubaa-asatx =

British-Columbian governmental reserve

The Tsʼuubaa-asatx Nation, previously called Lake Cowichan First Nation, government and reserve is located in Lake Cowichan, British Columbia (Ditidaht: baluxwaqst - "Lake Cowichan Town").

The Tsʼuubaa-asatx Nation, while its own distinct group, is closely linked to the peoples of the Cowichan Tribes band government, the largest band among the Coast Salish people. The Cowichan Tribes speak a "Hulʼqumiʼnum (Island dialect)" of Halkomelem (part of the Coast Salish languages); because the Tsʼuubaa-asatx have adopted the dialect of their dominant Salish neighbors, they are classed as part of the Hulʼqumiʼnum linguistic group.

There are currently (April 2022) 26 registered tribal members, their Cowichan Lake Reserve is on the north bank of Cowichan Lake, ca. 42.70 hectares.

The Tsʼuubaa-asatx ("People of the Lake, i.e. Cowichan Lake") usually known as "Lake Cowichan" and called by the neighboring Ditidaht-speaking peoples c̓uubaʕsaʔtx̣ are therefore often confused with the neighboring Cowichan Tribes (Quwʼutsun Mustimuhw / Quwʼutsun Hwulmuhw - "People of the Warm Land") - known by the Dititdaht as qiʔwiičidaʔtx̣ - "Duncan people", who speak a "Hulʼqumiʼnum (Island)" dialect of Halkomelem (part of the Coast Salish languages). They once spoke the "Tsʼuubaa-asatx dialect" of the Ditidaht language, a South Wakashan (Nootkan) language; currently, they are trying to revive their original culture and language with the support of the Nuu-chah-nulth and Ditidaht (Diitiid7aa7tx / Diitiidʔaaʔtx̣) ("People of Diitiidaʔ" or "People along the Diitiidaʔ, i.e. Jordan River") peoples. But regarding treaty negotiations with the government, the Tsʼuubaa-asatx are still together with the dominant Cowichan Tribes part of the "Hulʼqumiʼnum Treaty Group".

== History ==
Early settlers to the Lake Cowichan area described "a small tribe of Indians" living in "houses constructed of bark." During the 19th Century the Lake Cowichan First Nation was decimated by disease and conflict with neighboring groups. In 1887 the surveyor Ashdown Green reported that the Lake Cowichan people had once been a large tribe but had been nearly wiped out by war with the neighboring Cowichan Tribes and Ditidaht. In 1860, a prospector by the name of Samuel Harris travelled to the area seeking minerals and reported that many of the Natives were dead and dying from smallpox. Archaeological investigations have revealed the historic presence of a village on the north east side of the lake, within the boundaries of the present day Cowichan Lake Indian Reserve.

== See also ==
- Hulʼqumiʼnum Treaty Group
