= Penelakut First Nation =

Band government of the Penelakut people of British Columbia, Canada

Penelakut Tribe
- Band No. 650
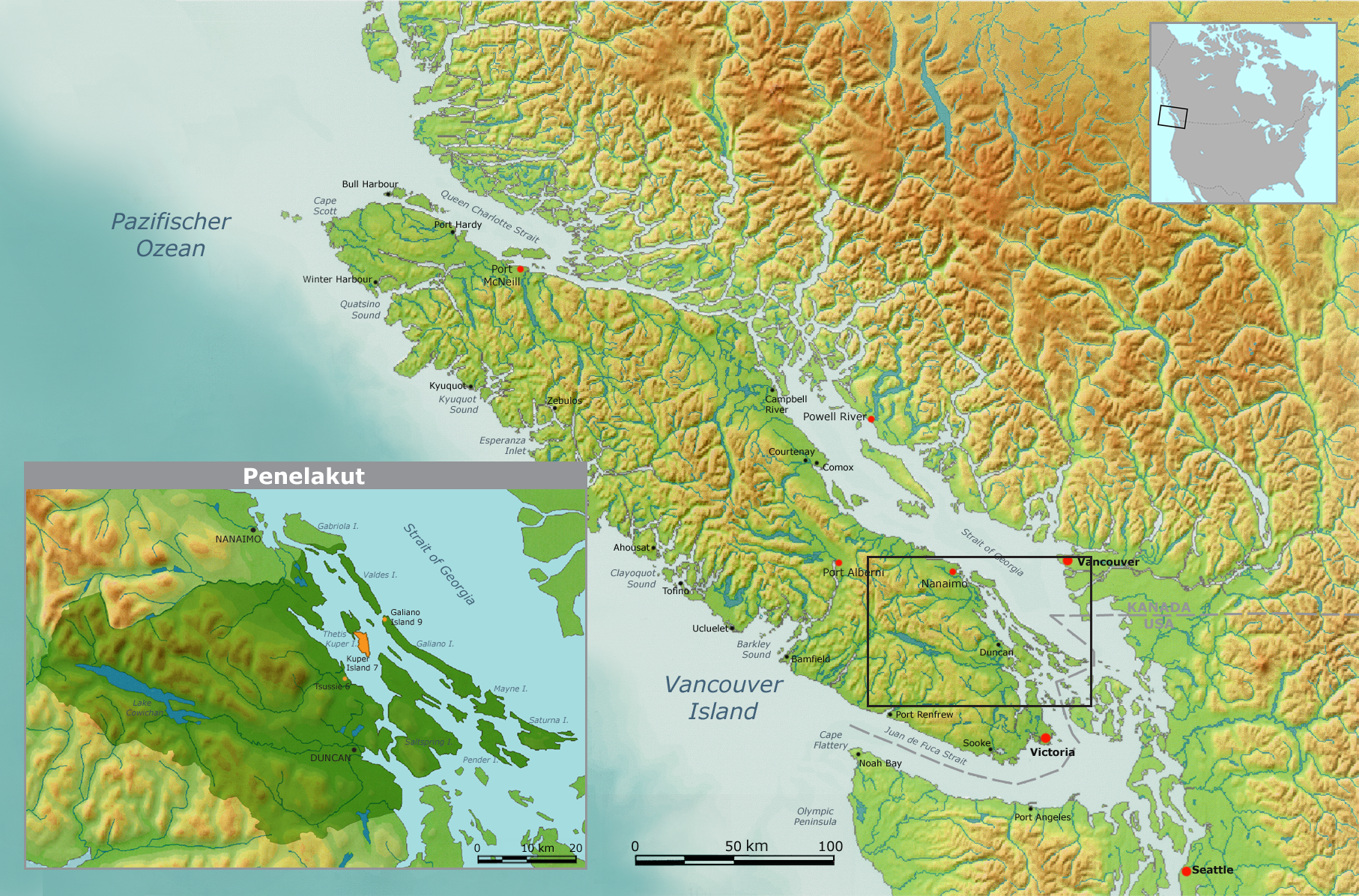
- Location of traditional Penelakut tribal territory
- People: Penelakut
- Headquarters: Chemainus
- Province: British Columbia

Land
- Other reserves: Galiano Island 9; Penelakut Island 7; Tent Island 8; Tsussie 6
- Land area: 635.70 ha (1,570.8 acres)

Population (2026)
- On reserve: 510
- On other land: 68
- Off reserve: 726
- Total population: 1304

Government
- Chief: Chakeenakwaut (Pam) Jack

Website
- penelakut.ca

Penelakut First Nation is the band government of the Penelakut people on Vancouver Island in British Columbia, Canada. Their headquarters is in Chemainus, British Columbia.

== Governance ==
The Penelakut are led by a democratically election chief and council. In 2024, they elected Rickie (Pam) Jack as their chief. Their council is as follows.

- Roger Charlie
- Sharon Cross
- Denny Jack
- Joshua James
- Freddy Mitchell Jr.
- Mike Sam
- Ken Thomas
- Regina Sam
- Kurt Irwin

== Alliances ==
The Penelakut Tribe is part of the Hul’qumi’num Treaty Group. The six member tribes are Chemainus First Nation, Cowichan Tribes, Halalt First Nation, Lake Cowichan First Nation, Lyackson First Nation, and Penelakut Tribe. All of the member tribes speak the Hul'qumi'num language.

== Lanuage ==
The Hul'qumi'num language is a Central Salish language. As of 2016, 40 of 555 Penelakut people spoke their Indigenous languages.

== Demographics ==
The Penelakut Tribe, INAC number 650, has 1,304, as of 2026. Of these, 510 live on their reserve, 68 live on other reserves, and 726 live off reserve.

== See also ==
- List of tribal councils in British Columbia
- Government of Canada Aboriginal Portal
