= Halalt First Nation =

Canadian First Nation tribe

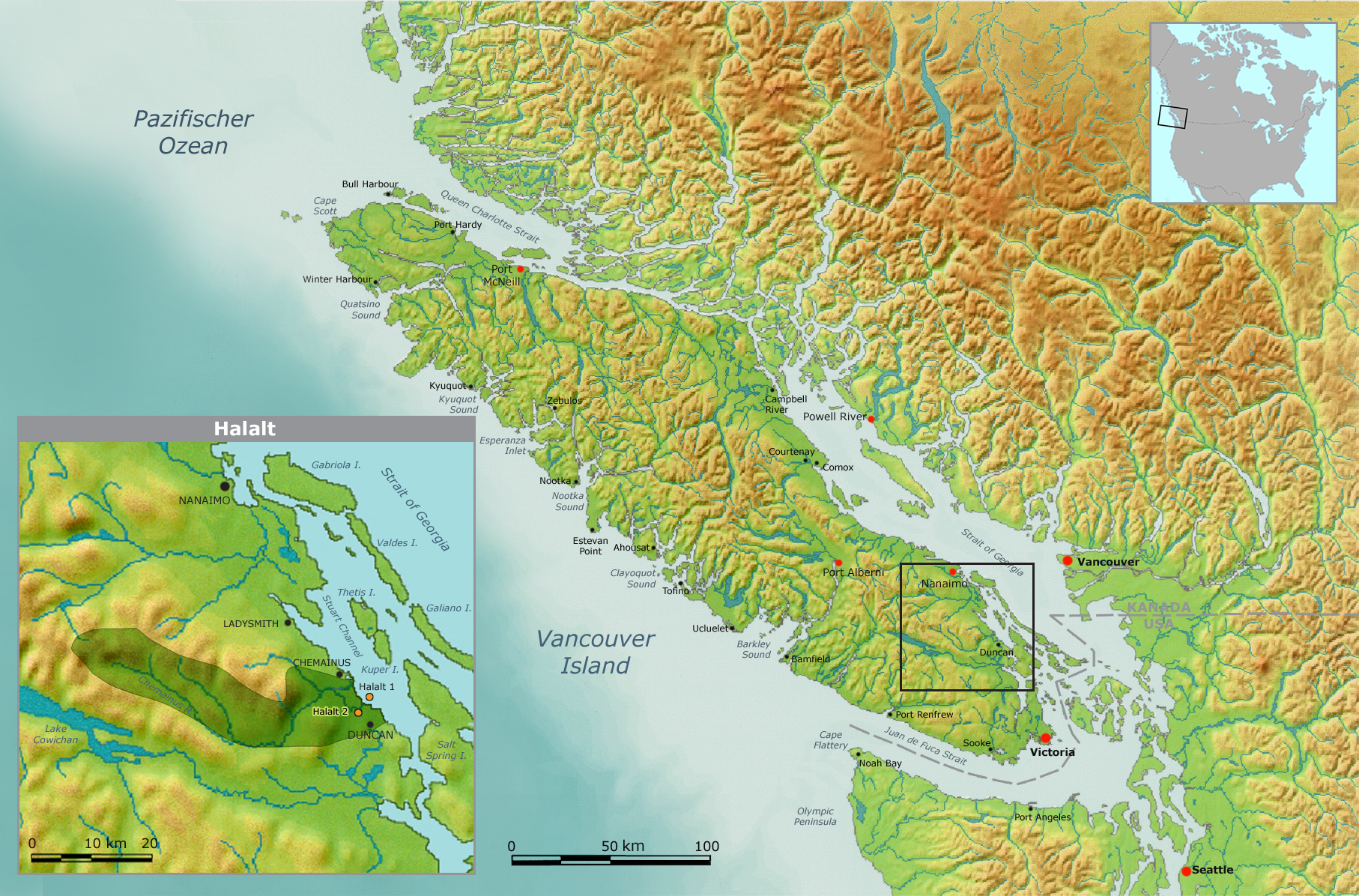
Traditional Halalt territory

Halalt First Nation' (Halkomelem Language: xeláltxw) is a First Nations tribe located on a reservation on the Chemainus River in southeastern Vancouver Island, British Columbia, Canada. The Halalt were originally from the village xeláltxw once located in the Cowichan Valley, and likely moved to Willy Island, the largest of the Shoal Islands, in the early 19th century.

Halalt First Nation is a member government of the Naut'sa Mawt Tribal Council, and affiliated with the Hul'qumi'num Treaty Group.

As of 2006, the Halalt had 202 members on two reserves.

== See also ==
- Hul'qumi'num (language)
