= Wei Wai Kum First Nation =

Campbell River
- Band No. 622
- Kwak'wala: Wei Wai Kum
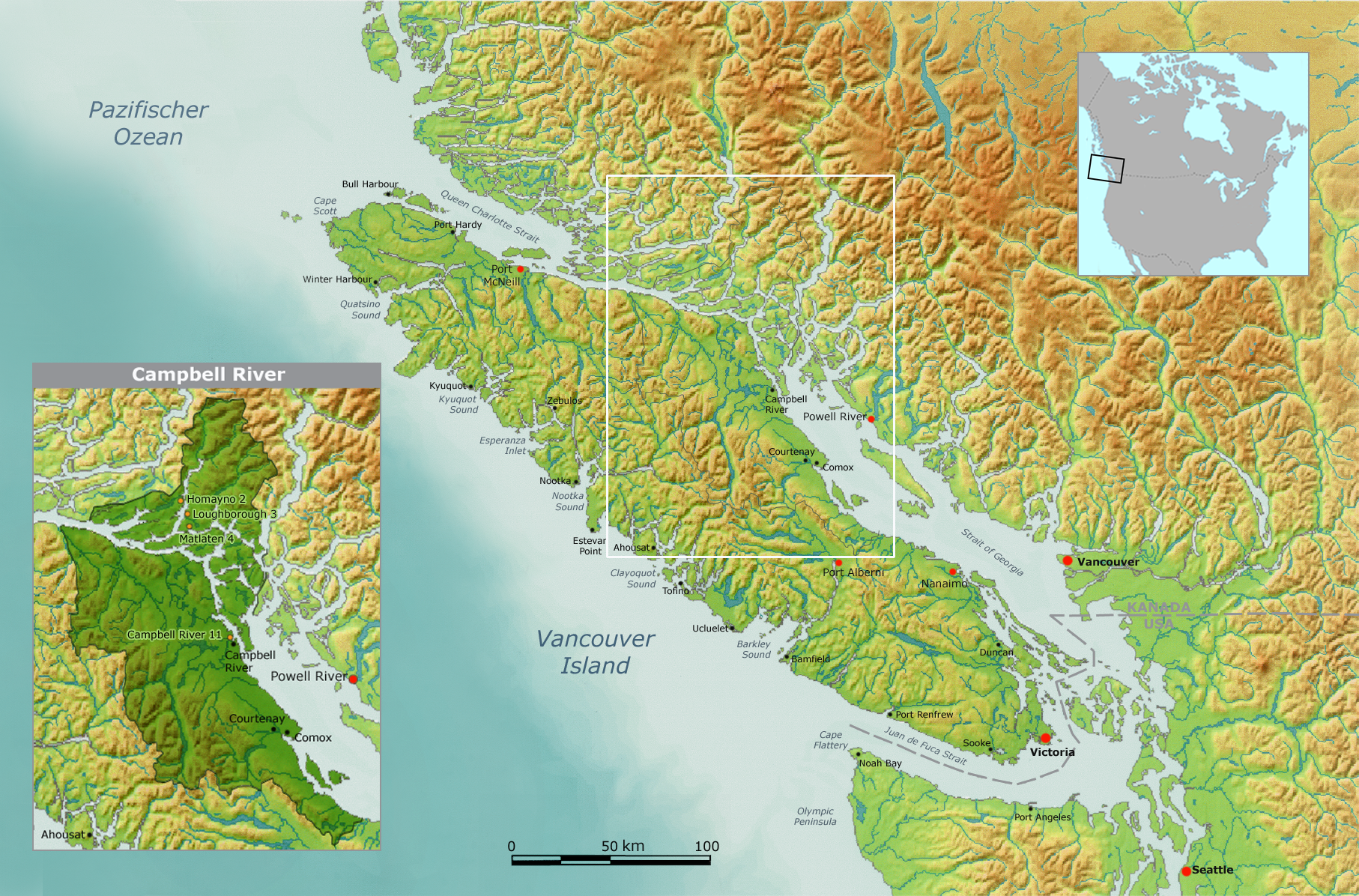
- Traditional territory of the Wei Wai Kum First Nation
- People: Kwakwaka'wakw
- Headquarters: Campbell River
- Province: British Columbia

Land
- Main reserve: Campbell River 11
- Reserves: Homayno 2; Loughborough 3; Matlaten 4; Campbell River 13
- Land area: 2.03 km^{2} (0.78 sq mi)

Population (2025)
- On reserve: 355
- On other land: 36
- Off reserve: 564
- Total population: 955

Government
- Chief: Christopher Roberts
- Council: 2023–27: Shelly Haunch; Lorraine Henderson; Dawn Duncan; Sonny Assu; Kimberly Puglas; Rony Roberts Jr.; Christine Smith

Tribal Council
- Laich-Kwil-Tach Treaty Society / Nanwakolas Council

Website
- weiwaikum.ca

The Wei Wai Kum First Nation, also called Campbell River First Nation, are the band government of one of the component groups of the Laich-kwil-tach or Southern Kwakiutl subgroup of the Kwakwaka'wakw peoples, based at the city of Campbell River. They are part of the Hamatla Treaty Society.

== Chief and Councillors ==
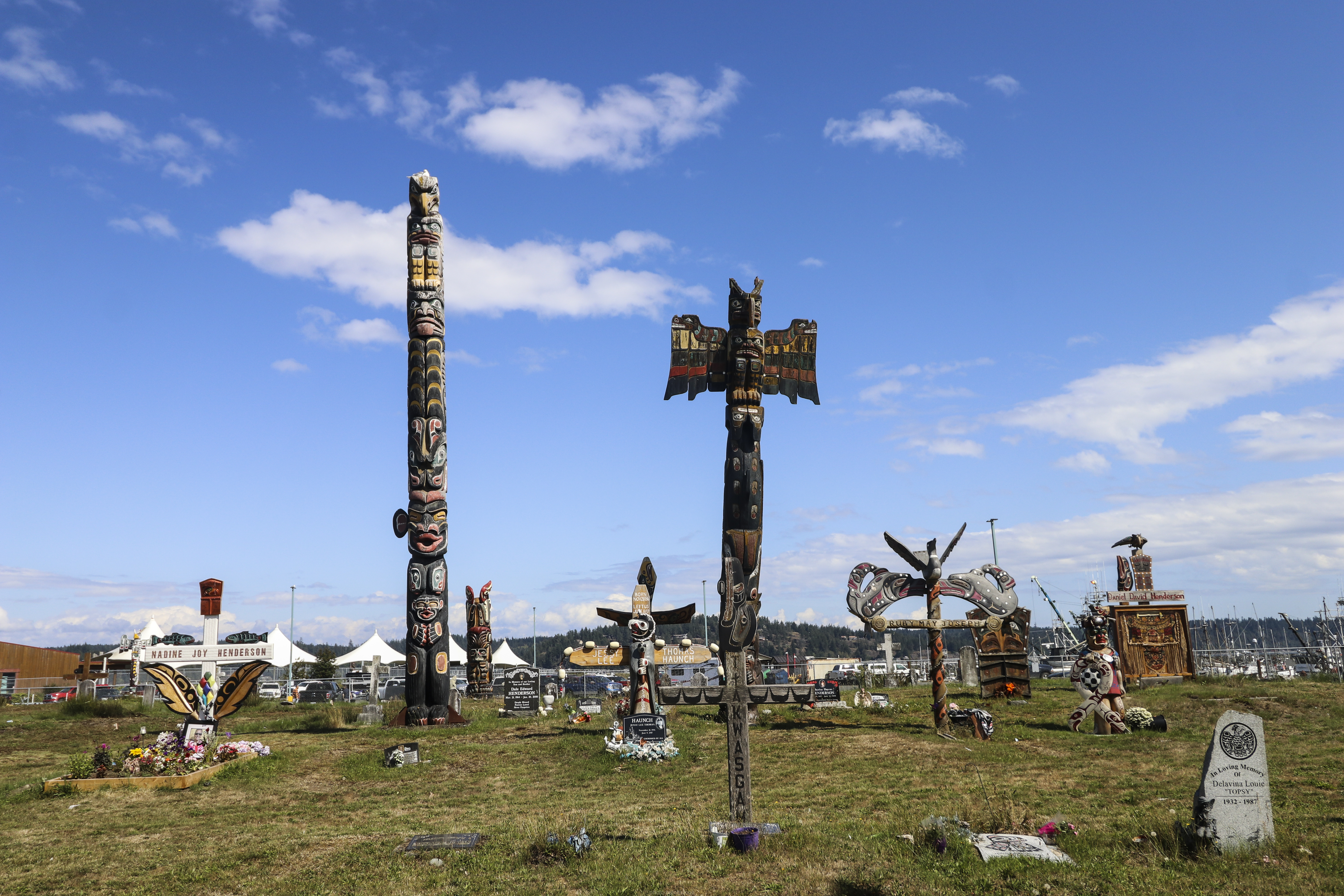
Wei Wai Kum First Nation Memorial Poles

- Chief Councillor — Christopher Roberts
- Councillors — Jim Henderson, Lorraine Henderson, Tony Roberts Jr, Shelly Haunch, Kim Puglas

== Demographics ==
The Wei Wai Kum First Nation has 941 members as of 2021.

== Indian Reserves ==
Indian Reserves under the band’s administration are:

- Campbell River 11, 127.5 ha. in size
- Campbell River 13, 79.5 ha. in size
- Homayno 3, 15.4 ha. in size
- Loughborough 3, 8.5 ha. in size
- Matlaten 4, 39 ha. in size
