= Nanoose First Nation =

First Nations government

- Band No. 649
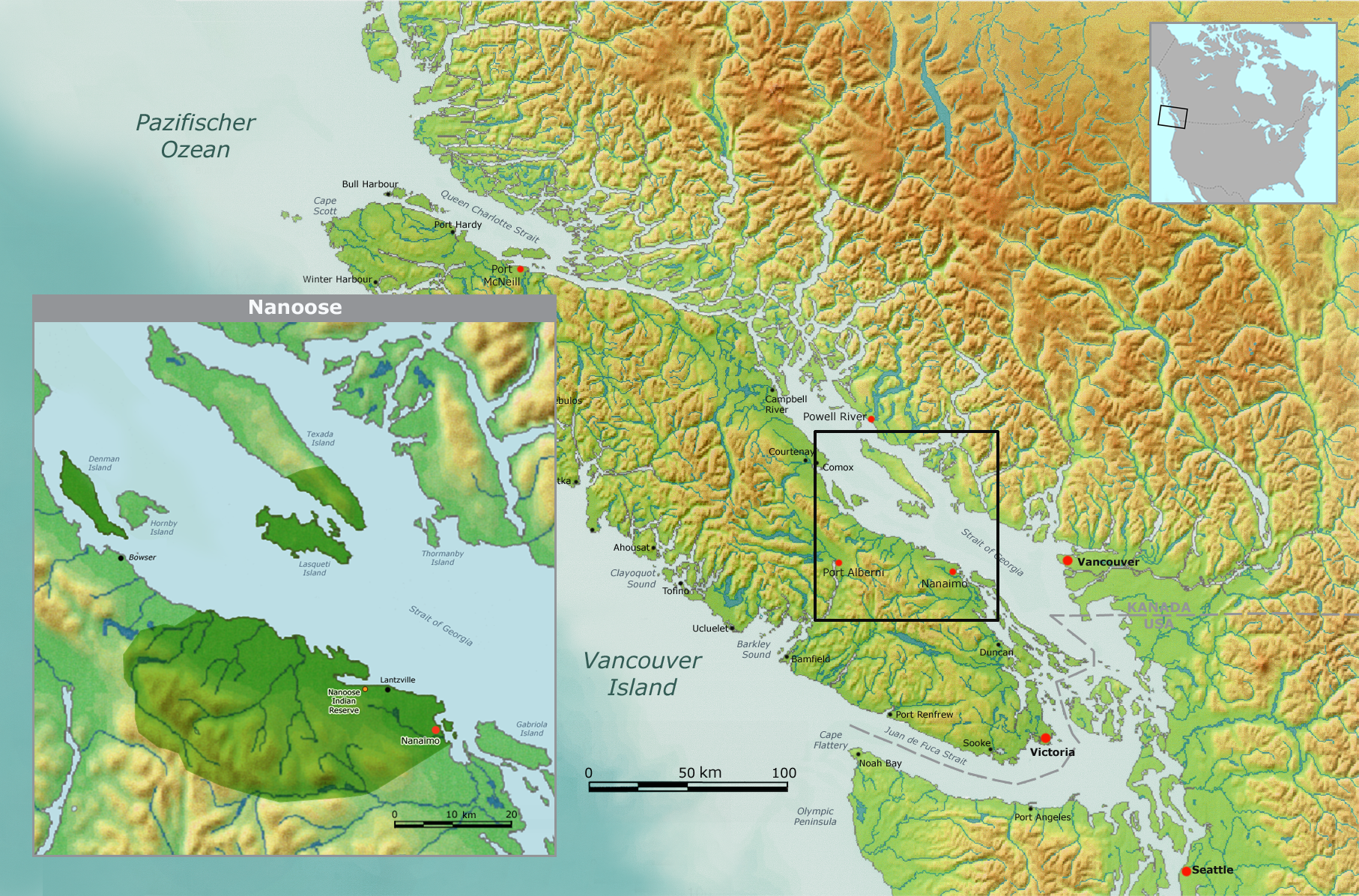
- Map of Nanoose First Nation Territory
- People: Coast Salish
- Headquarters: 209 Mallard Way, Lantzville
- Province: British Columbia

Land
- Main reserve: Nanoose
- Land area: 0.626 km^{2} (0.242 sq mi)

Population (June 2025)
- On reserve: 175
- On other land: 12
- Off reserve: 94
- Total population: 281

Government
- Chief: Brent Collin Edwards
- Council: Christopher Bob; Gordon Edwards; Cheryl Jones; Lawrence Mitchell

Tribal Council
- Naut'sa mawt Tribal Council

Website
- https://snawnawas.org/

Nanoose First Nation, also known as Snaw-naw-as First Nation, is a First Nations government located on central Vancouver Island in southwestern British Columbia, Canada, in the vicinity of the community of Nanoose Bay. They are Coast Salish people, and one of the most northern tribes on the east side of Vancouver Island. The Nation's language is Hul’q’umi’num’, one of three branches of the Halkomelem dialect.

The Snaw-naw-as are named after the sole survivor of a battle in the 1800s. The name comes from the word “Naus” which means “the way in the harbour”. There are many spelling variants of Snaw-naw-as such as Snonoose, Sno-no-was, Nuas, and Nanooa and Snuwnuwus.

Nanoose First Nation is a member government of the Naut'sa mawt Tribal Council.

== See also ==
- Halkomelem Language
