= Winalagalis Treaty Group =

Group of four First Nations band governments in British Columbia, Canada

The Winalagalis Treaty Group is a group of four First Nations band governments on Vancouver Island in the Canadian province of British Columbia, Canada. The group was formed to coordinate and administer negotiations with the government of the Province of British Columbia relating to unresolved treaty issues. It has opted engage in a separate round of negotiation from the rest of the Kwakwaka'wakw peoples (Kwak'wala speaking peoples, often incorrectly called the Kwakiutl). The member nations of the Winalagalis Treaty Group are Da'naxda'xw Awaetlatla Nation, Gwa'Sala-'Nakwaxda'xw Nation, Quatsino First Nation and Tlatlasikwala Nation.

== See also ==
- Winalagalis
