= Siwhe Mountain =

Summit located in British Columbia, Canada

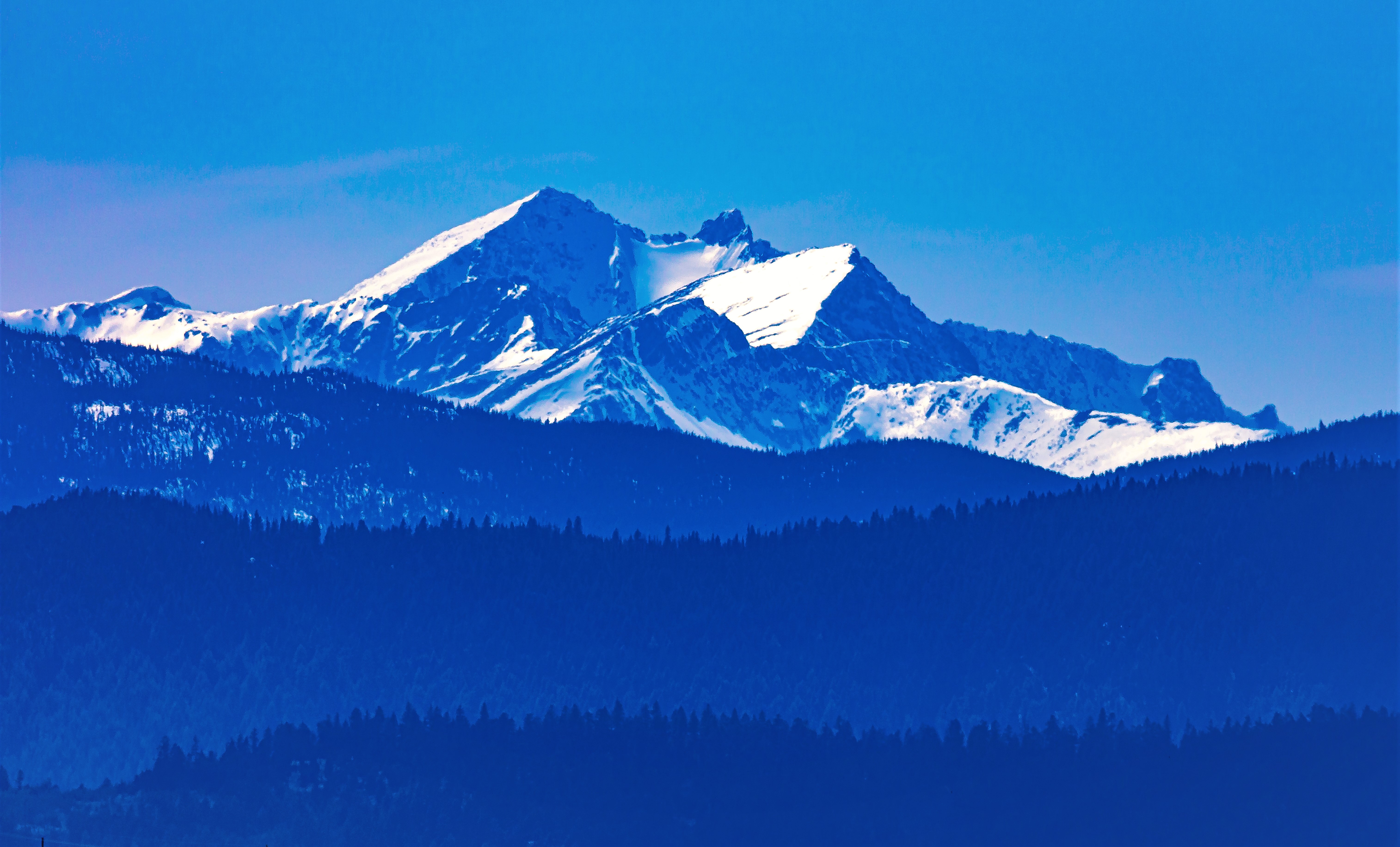
- East aspect

Highest point
- Elevation: 2,843 m (9,327 ft)
- Prominence: 839 m (2,753 ft)
- Parent peak: Mount Brew (2,891 m)
- Isolation: 15.1 km (9.4 mi)
- Listing: Mountains of British Columbia
- Coordinates: 50°21′41″N 121°50′24″W

Geography
- Location within British Columbia Location within Canada
- Interactive map of Siwhe Mountain
- Country: Canada
- Province: British Columbia
- District: Kamloops Division Yale Land District
- Protected area: Stein Valley Nlaka'pamux Heritage Park
- Parent range: Lillooet Ranges; Coast Mountains
- Topo map: NTS 92I5 Stein River

Siwhe Mountain is a 2,843-metre (9,327-foot) summit located in British Columbia, Canada.

== Description ==
Siwhe Mountain is situated 24 km (15 mi) northwest of Lytton in the Lillooet Ranges of the Coast Mountains. It is the fifth-highest point in the Lillooet Ranges, and third-highest point in Stein Valley Nlaka'pamux Heritage Park. Precipitation runoff from the mountain drains north to Siwhe Creek, and south to Stein River, which are both tributaries of the Fraser River. Siwhe Mountain is more notable for its steep rise above local terrain than for its absolute elevation as topographic relief is significant with the summit rising over 2,250 meters (7,382 ft) above Stein Valley in 5.5 km (3.4 mi). The mountain's toponym was officially adopted October 6, 1936, by the Geographical Names Board of Canada, as suggested by W.H. Matthews, Geological Survey of Canada, on account of its proximity to Siwhe Creek. The first ascent of the mountain was likely made by prospectors.

== Climate ==
Based on the Köppen climate classification, Siwhe Mountain is located in the marine west coast climate zone of western North America. Most weather fronts originate in the Pacific Ocean, and travel east toward the Coast Mountains where they are forced upward by the range (Orographic lift), causing them to drop their moisture in the form of rain or snowfall. As a result, the Coast Mountains experience high precipitation, especially during the winter months in the form of snowfall. Winter temperatures can drop below −20 °C with wind chill factors below −30 °C. This climate supports a small glacier in the peak's east cirque. The months July through September offer the most favorable weather for viewing or climbing Siwhe Mountain.

== Gallery ==
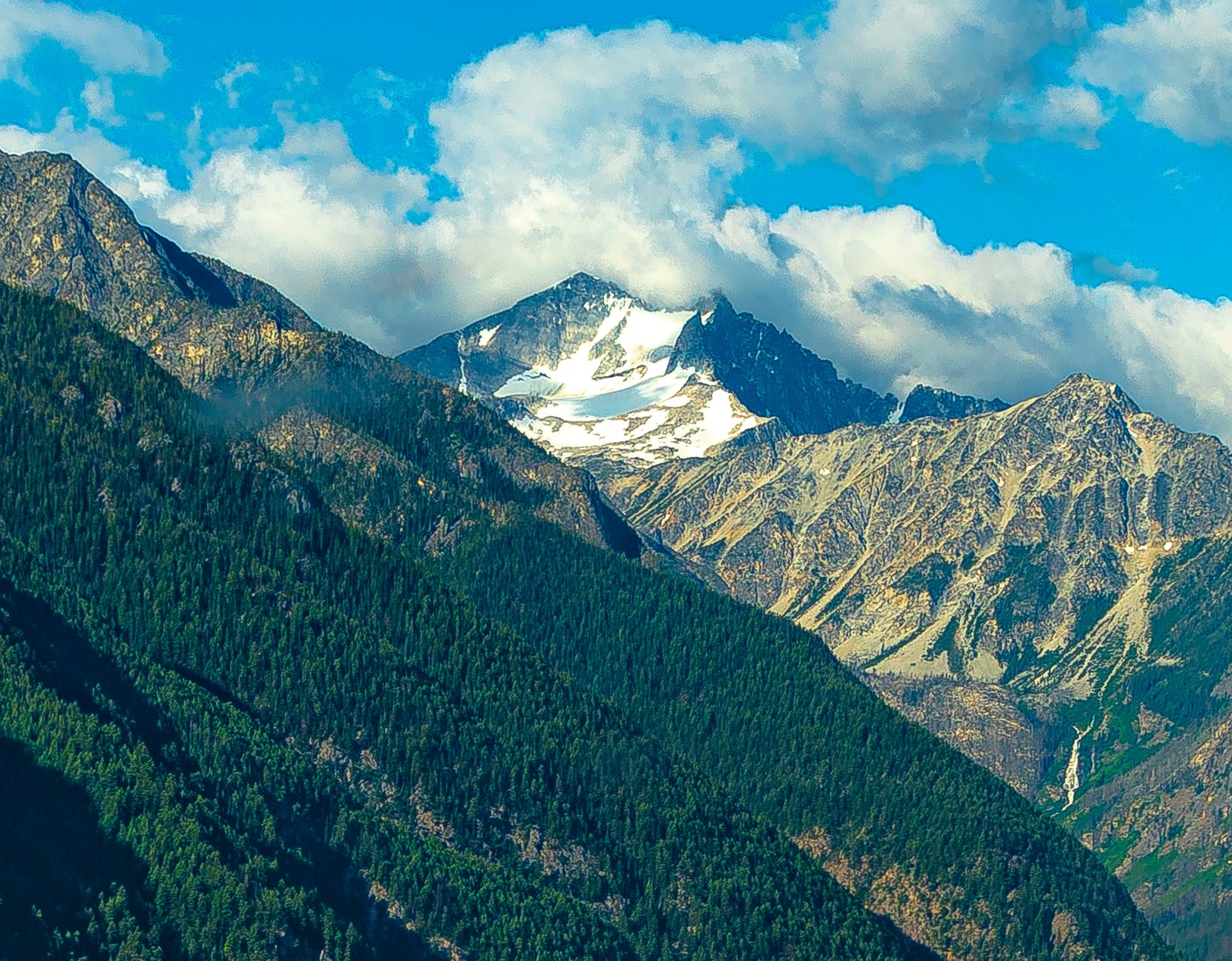
Northeast aspect

== See also ==
- Geography of British Columbia
- Geology of British Columbia
