= Antimony Mountain =

Mountain in British Columbia, Canada

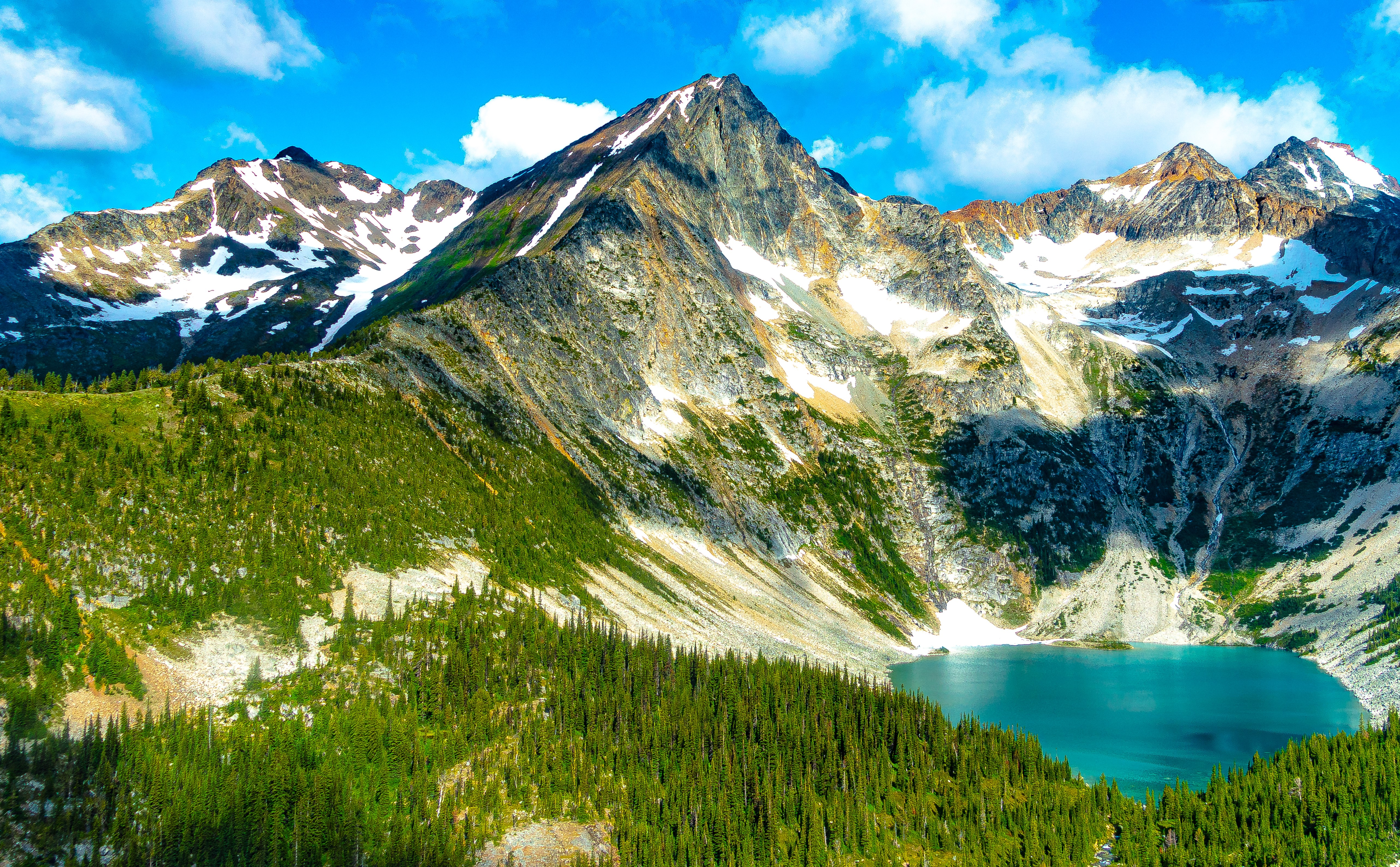
- Southeast aspect, with Antimony Lake

Highest point
- Elevation: 2,668 m (8,753 ft)
- Prominence: 128 m (420 ft)
- Parent peak: Skihist Mountain (2,968 m)
- Isolation: 1.03 km (0.64 mi)
- Listing: Mountains of British Columbia
- Coordinates: 50°10′04″N 121°53′35″W

Geography
- Location within British Columbia Location within Canada
- Interactive map of Antimony Mountain
- Country: Canada
- Province: British Columbia
- District: Kamloops Division Yale Land District
- Protected area: Stein Valley Nlaka'pamux Heritage Park
- Parent range: Lillooet Ranges; Coast Mountains
- Topo map: NTS 92I4 Lytton

Antimony Mountain is a 2,668-metre (8,753-foot) mountain summit located in British Columbia, Canada.

== Description ==
This remote peak is situated 23 km (14 mi) west-southwest of Lytton on the eastern boundary of Stein Valley Nlaka'pamux Heritage Park. It is part of the Lillooet Ranges of the Coast Mountains and the nearest higher neighbor is Claimpost Peak, 1.03 km (1 mi) to the north. Precipitation runoff from the peak's south and east sides drains to Kwoiek Creek, thence Fraser River, and the west slope drains into headwaters of Nesbitt Creek → Stein River → Fraser River. Topographic relief is significant as the summit rises 1,530 metres (5,020 ft) above Kwoiek Creek in 3 km (1.9 mi) and approximately 800 metres (2,625 ft) above Antimony Lake in one kilometre.

== Etymology ==
The mountain is named for Antimony, the metallic element (identified as Sb in the Periodic table). It is most frequently used as a constituent of alloys and semiconductors. The toponym was officially adopted on March 2, 1950, by the Geographical Names Board of Canada as submitted by W.H. Matthews of the Geological Survey of Canada.

== Climate ==
Based on the Köppen climate classification, Antimony Mountain is located in a subarctic climate zone of western North America. Most weather fronts originate in the Pacific Ocean, and travel east toward the Coast Mountains where they are forced upward by the range (Orographic lift), causing them to drop their moisture in the form of rain or snowfall. As a result, the Coast Mountains experience high precipitation, especially during the winter months in the form of snowfall. Winter temperatures can drop below −20 °C with wind chill factors below −30 °C. The months July through September offer the most favorable weather for climbing Antimony Mountain.

== See also ==
- Geography of British Columbia
