= Claimpost Peak =

Mountain in British Columbia, Canada

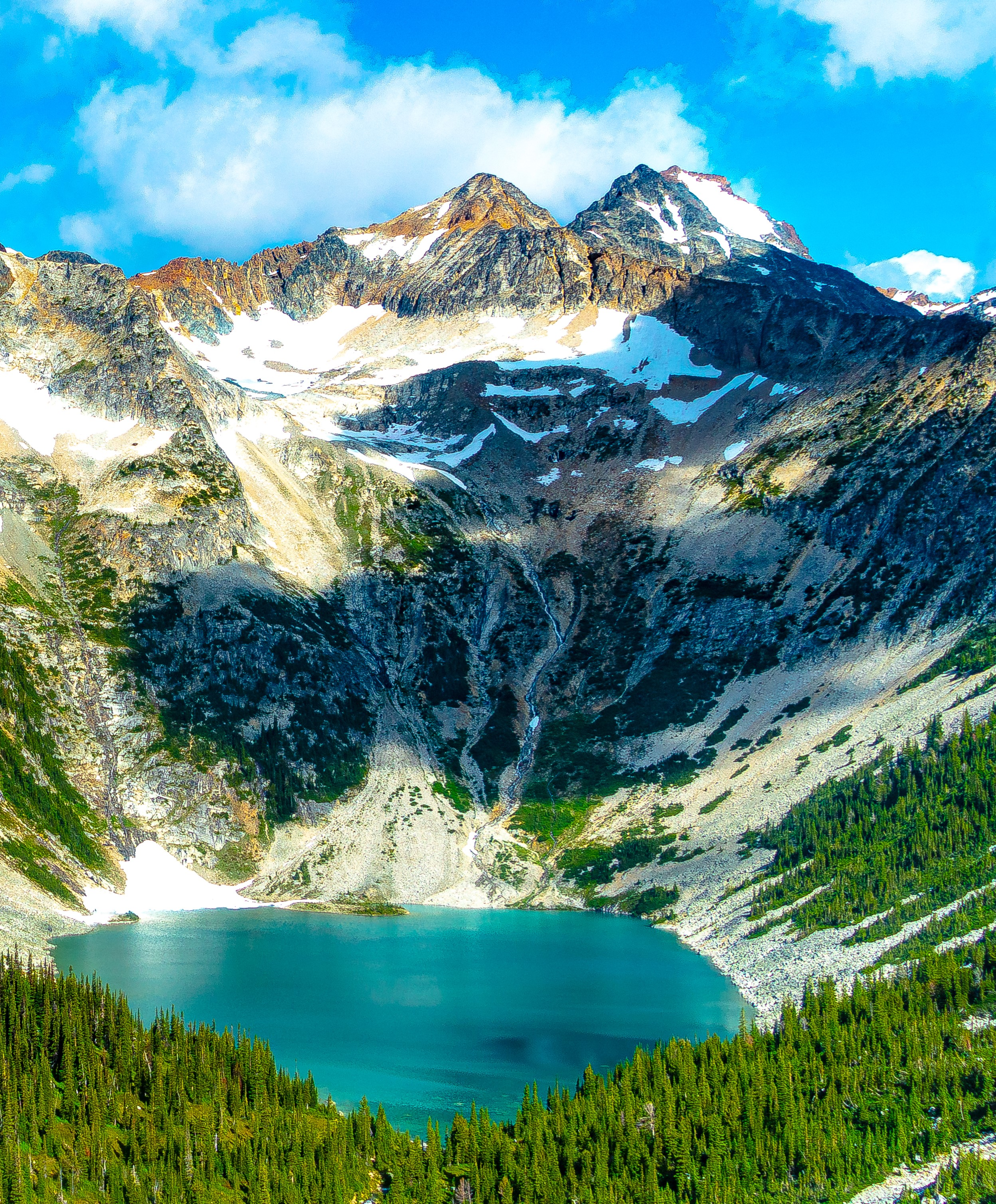
- Southeast aspect, with Antimony Lake (Top of Skihist Mountain behind, right)

Highest point
- Elevation: 2,671 m (8,763 ft)
- Prominence: 71 m (233 ft)
- Parent peak: Skihist Mountain (2,968 m)
- Isolation: 1.54 km (0.96 mi)
- Listing: Mountains of British Columbia
- Coordinates: 50°10′36″N 121°53′25″W

Geography
- Location within British Columbia Location within Canada
- Interactive map of Claimpost Peak
- Country: Canada
- Province: British Columbia
- District: Kamloops Division Yale Land District
- Protected area: Stein Valley Nlaka'pamux Heritage Park
- Parent range: Lillooet Ranges; Coast Mountains
- Topo map: NTS 92I4 Lytton

Claimpost Peak is a 2,671-metre (8,763-foot) mountain summit located in British Columbia, Canada.

== Description ==
This remote peak is situated 23 km (14 mi) west-southwest of Lytton on the eastern boundary of Stein Valley Nlaka'pamux Heritage Park. It is part of the Lillooet Ranges of the Coast Mountains. The nearest neighbor is Antimony Mountain 1.03 km (1 mi) to the south, and the nearest higher neighbor is Skihist Mountain, 1.54 km (1 mi) to the northwest. Precipitation runoff from the peak's south and east sides drains to Kwoiek Creek, thence Fraser River, whereas the west slope drains into headwaters of Nesbitt Creek → Stein River → Fraser River. Topographic relief is significant as the summit rises 800 metres (2,625 ft) above Antimony Lake in approximately 1.5 km (0.93 mi) and 900 metres (2,953 ft) above an unnamed lake to the east in 1.5 km (0.93 mi).

== Etymology ==
The mountain was named by a 1973 climbing party that found old wooden claim posts lying on the summit area. The toponym was officially adopted on January 23, 1979, by the Geographical Names Board of Canada.

== Climate ==
Based on the Köppen climate classification, Claimpost Peak is located in a subarctic climate zone of western North America. Most weather fronts originate in the Pacific Ocean, and travel east toward the Coast Mountains where they are forced upward by the range (Orographic lift), causing them to drop their moisture in the form of rain or snowfall. As a result, the Coast Mountains experience high precipitation, especially during the winter months in the form of snowfall. Winter temperatures can drop below −20 °C with wind chill factors below −30 °C. The months July through September offer the most favorable weather for climbing Claimpost Peak.

== See also ==
- Geography of British Columbia
