= Mount Brew (Lillooet Ranges) =

Mountain in British Columbia, Canada

- Location within British Columbia
- Interactive map of Mount Brew

Highest point
- Elevation: 2,891 m (9,485 ft)
- Prominence: 1,035 m (3,396 ft)
- Parent peak: Skihist Mountain (2968 m)
- Listing: Mountains of British Columbia
- Coordinates: 50°35′06″N 121°58′16″W

Geography
- Location: British Columbia, Canada
- District: Lillooet Land District
- Parent range: Lillooet Ranges
- Topo map: NTS 92I12 Lillooet

Mount Brew is a mountain located 12 km (7 mi) south of Lillooet and 44 km (27 mi) north of Skihist Mountain in south-central British Columbia, Canada. It lies on the western side of the Fraser River and is the third-highest mountain of the Lillooet Ranges, after Skihist Mountain and Petlushkwohap Mountain in the Cantilever Range to the west of Lytton.

The mountain was named in 1859 by Lt. Mayne for Chartres Brew, a police officer and judge in the Colony of British Columbia.
