= Grizzly Falls (British Columbia) =

Waterfall located in British Columbia, Canada

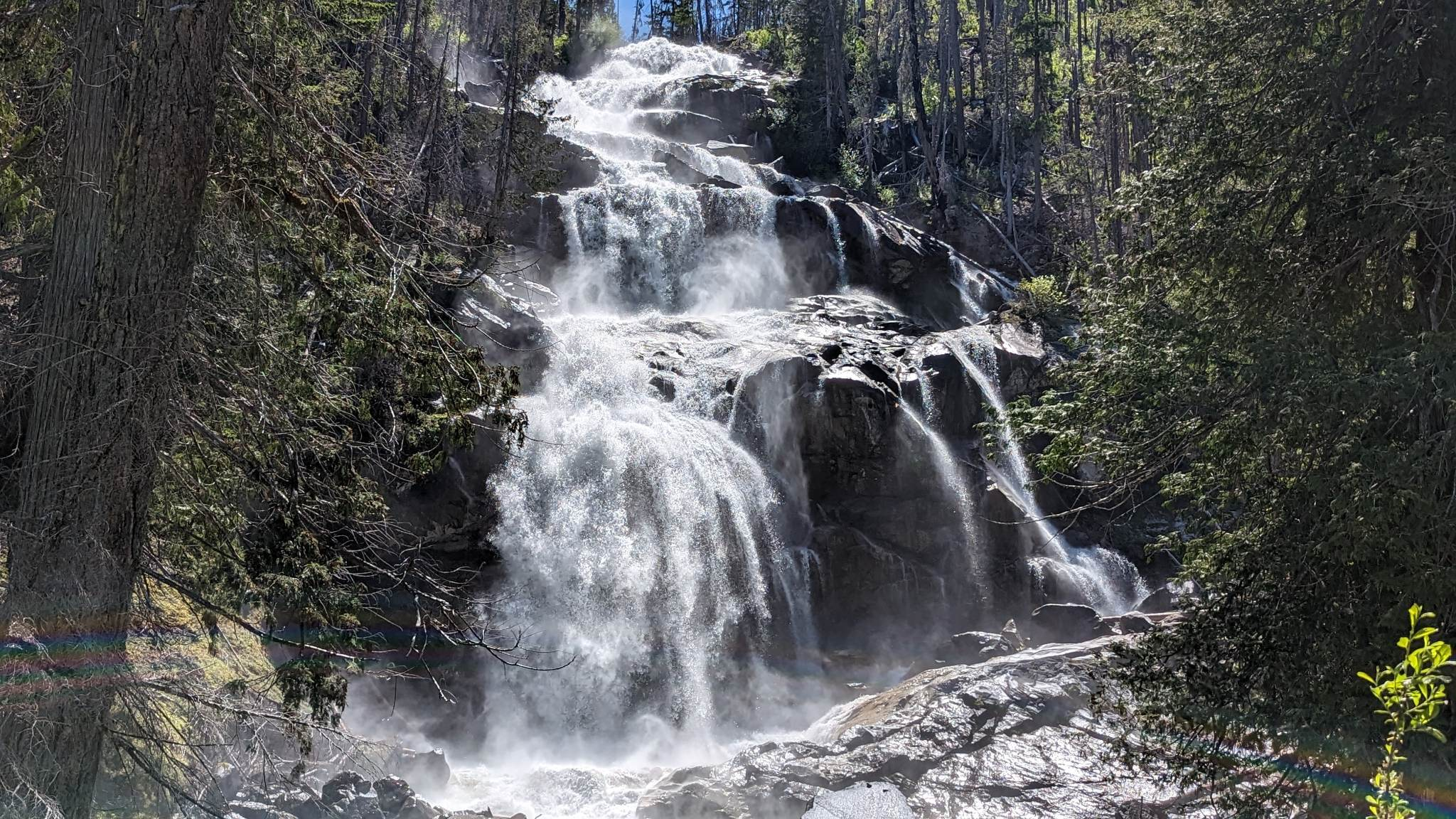
- Grizzly Falls
- Location: Fraser Valley, British Columbia, Canada
- Type: Steep Tiered Cascades
- Total height: 276 ft (84 m)
- Number of drops: 4
- Watercourse: Grizzly Creek

Grizzly Falls is a 276-foot (84 m) waterfall in the Fraser Valley region of British Columbia, Canada. It is located on Grizzly Creek, a tributary of the Nahatlatch River.

The falls are described as a series of four steep tiered cascades.

== Location and access ==
Grizzly Falls is a remote waterfall located in the Nahatlatch Valley, west of Boston Bar. Access is via the Nahatlatch Forest Service Road. The turnoff for the falls is located approximately 49 kilometres (30 mi) from North Bend, just after the main bridge crossing the Nahatlatch River. A final 2-kilometre (1.2 mi) road leads from the turnoff to the falls. This final section of road has been noted as being in poor condition and may not be suitable for low-clearance vehicles.

The falls are located near the boundaries of Nahatlatch Provincial Park and Protected Area and Mehatl Creek Provincial Park.

== See also ==
- List of waterfalls
- List of waterfalls in British Columbia
