= Akasik Mountain =

Mountain in British Columbia, Canada

- Location within British Columbia
- Interactive map of Akasik Mountain

Highest point
- Elevation: 2,450 m (8,040 ft)
- Prominence: 285 m (935 ft)
- Parent peak: Petlushkwohap Mountain (2939 m)
- Listing: Mountains of British Columbia
- Coordinates: 50°14′16″N 121°45′55″W

Geography
- Country: Canada
- Province: British Columbia
- District: Kamloops Division Yale Land District
- Parent range: Lillooet Ranges
- Topo map: NTS 93D1 Jacobsen Glacier

Akasik Mountain is a mountain in the Lillooet Ranges of British Columbia, Canada, located southwest of the town of Lytton.

The mountain is associated in the lore of the Nlakaʼpamux people with Skihist Mountain, whose name means "jump" or "leap" and is a reference to a mythological giant who leapt back and forth between Skihist and this summit.
