= Nahatlatch Provincial Park and Protected Area =

Protected area of the Canadian province of British Columbia

Nahatlatch Provincial Park
- IUCN category II (national park)
- Location within British Columbia
- Interactive map of Nahatlatch Provincial Park
- Location: British Columbia, Canada
- Nearest city: Lytton
- Coordinates: 49°58′32″N 121°47′56″W
- Area: 20.09 km^{2} (7.76 sq mi)
- Established: June 28, 1999
- Governing body: BC Parks

Nahatlatch Provincial Park and Protected Area is a provincial park in British Columbia, Canada, surrounding the Nahatlatch River in the southern Lillooet Ranges to the southwest of Lytton. Access to the river and the park is via the Boston Bar-North Bend Bridge and the Nahatlatch Forest Service Road.

== See also ==
- Mehatl Creek Provincial Park
