= Chartres Brew =

Canadian judge

- Born: 31 December 1815; Corofin, County Clare, Ireland
- Died: 31 May 1870 (aged 54); Richfield, Colony of British Columbia
- Occupations: Policeman, judge, gold commissioner
- Years active: 1858-1870
- Known for: Resolving the Grouse Creek War

Chartres Brew (31 December 1815 – 31 May 1870) was a Gold commissioner, Chief Constable and judge in the Colony of British Columbia, later a province of Canada.

Brew's name was conferred on two mountain summits in British Columbia, both named Mount Brew. The higher one at 2,891 m (9,485 ft) is located just south of the Fraser Canyon town of Lillooet, and which is the second-highest in the Lillooet Ranges after Skihist Mountain. The other is just east of Likely, British Columbia in the Cariboo district, 2,057 m (6,749 ft), adjacent to Quesnel Lake.

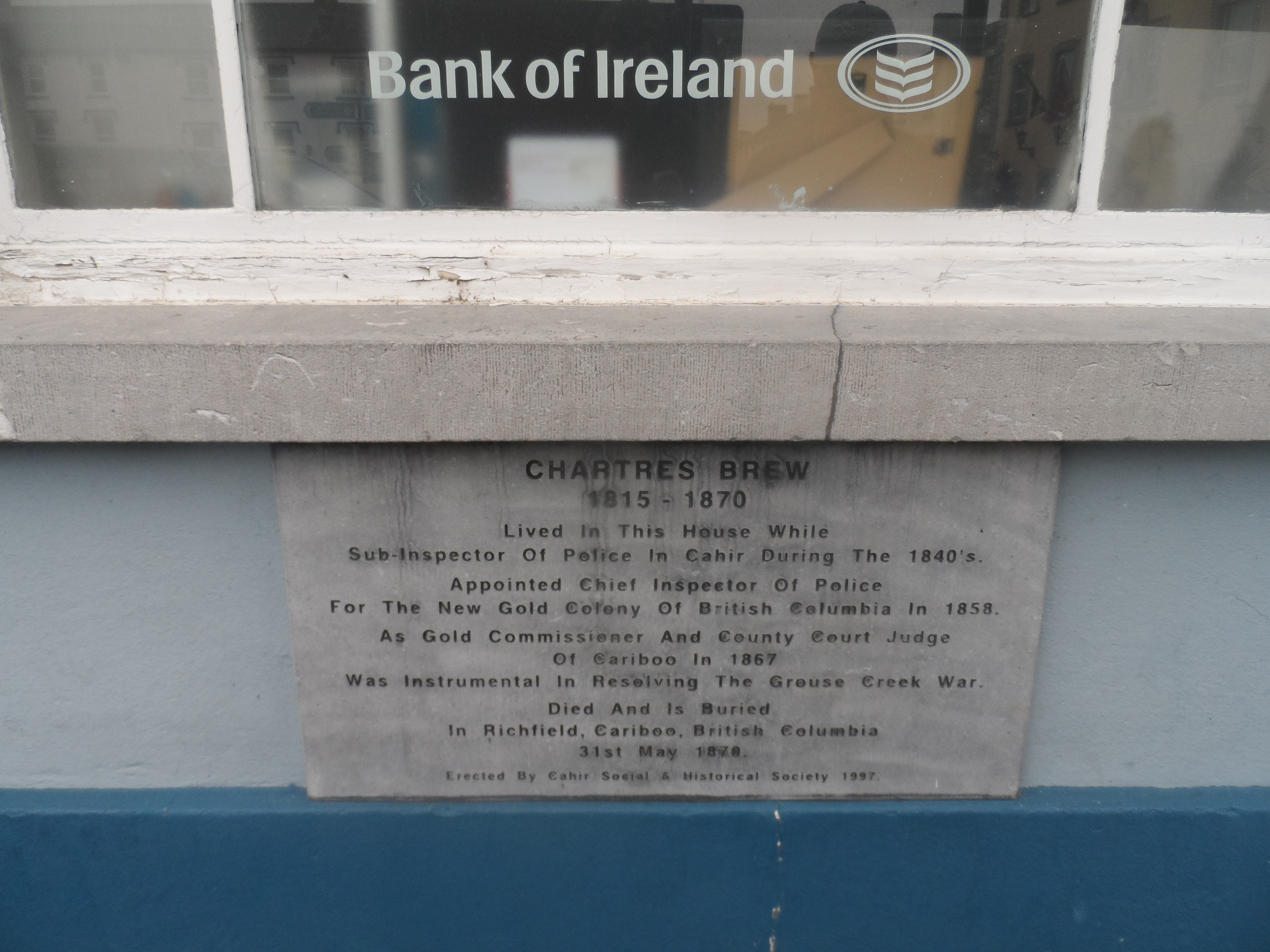
Sign in Cahir, Ireland, marking a house where Brew lived while subinspector of police.
