= Cantilever Range =

Mountain range in British Columbia, Canada

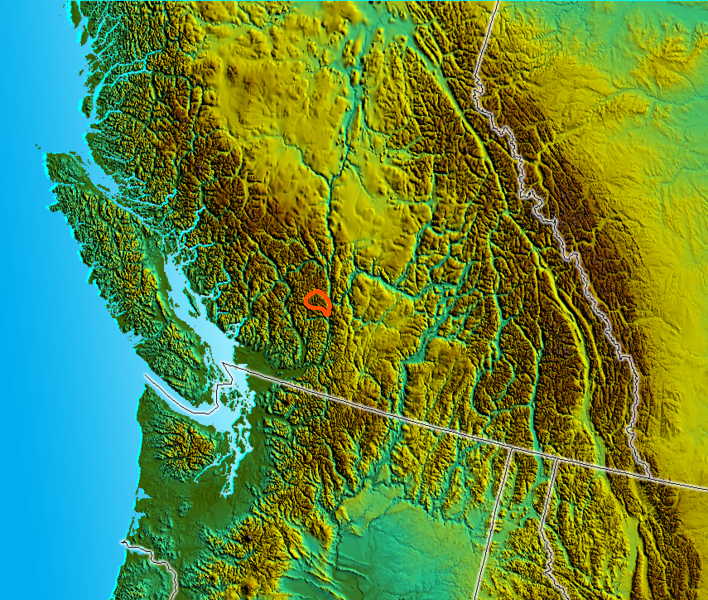
- Location map of Cantilever Range

Highest point
- Peak: Skihist Mountain
- Elevation: 2,968 m (9,738 ft)
- Coordinates: 50°11′N 121°42′W

Dimensions
- Area: 475 km^{2} (183 mi^{2})

Geography
- Country: Canada
- Province: British Columbia
- Range coordinates: 50°10′59″N 121°42′04″W
- Parent range: Lillooet Ranges

The Cantilever Range is a mountain range in southwestern British Columbia, Canada, a subrange of the Lillooet Ranges, which is itself a subgrouping of the Pacific Ranges of the Coast Mountains. About 1100 km^{2} in area and about 50 km east to west and 35 km north to south, the Cantilever Range is located southwest of Lytton between the valleys of the Stein River (N) and Kwoiek Creek (S).

The Cantilever Range is the highest sector of the Lillooet Ranges and is crowned by Skihist Mountain, which stands 2,968 m (9,738 ft) in elevation, making it the highest mountain in southwestern British Columbia. The next-highest is nearby Petlushkwohap Mountain, standing 2,939 m (9,642 ft). Most other peaks in the range, which is really a ridge between the two watersheds defining it, are more or less subpeaks of these two.

The north flank of the Cantilever Range is in the Stein Valley Nlaka'pamux Heritage Park.
