= Foster Bar =

Settlement in British Columbia, Canada

Coordinates: 50°31′36″N 121°45′21″W

Foster Bar, originally known as Foster's Bar, is a gold-bearing sandbar in the Fraser Canyon of British Columbia, Canada as well as the name used for the surrounding locality, which includes Nesikep Indian Reserve 6 and Nesikep Indian Reserve 6A of the Cayoose Creek First Nation of the St'at'imc people and Lytton Indian Reserves Nos. 6A and 5B and Seah Indian Reserve No. 5 of the Lytton First Nation of the Nlaka'pamux people.

== History ==
Foster Bar is notable for being one of the first places on the Fraser to be mined for gold in the mid-1850s, a few years in advance of the Fraser Canyon Gold Rush of 1858. Foster Bar remained important during the gold rush as a junction between the River Trail and a route that led through a low pass in the Clear Range via Fountain Valley to Fountain (then called the "Upper Fountain") which was a junction and staging ground and roadhouse on the route of the Old Cariboo Road from Lillooet and Alexandria and also via Marble Canyon to Upper Hat Creek to connect to the Brigade Trail beyond, and at that same junction with the Cariboo Road once it was completed.

The Foster Bar Ranch was founded in 1865 by Frederick Joseph Watkinson and his wife Catherine.
