= Twin Goat Mountain =

Mountain in British Columbia, Canada

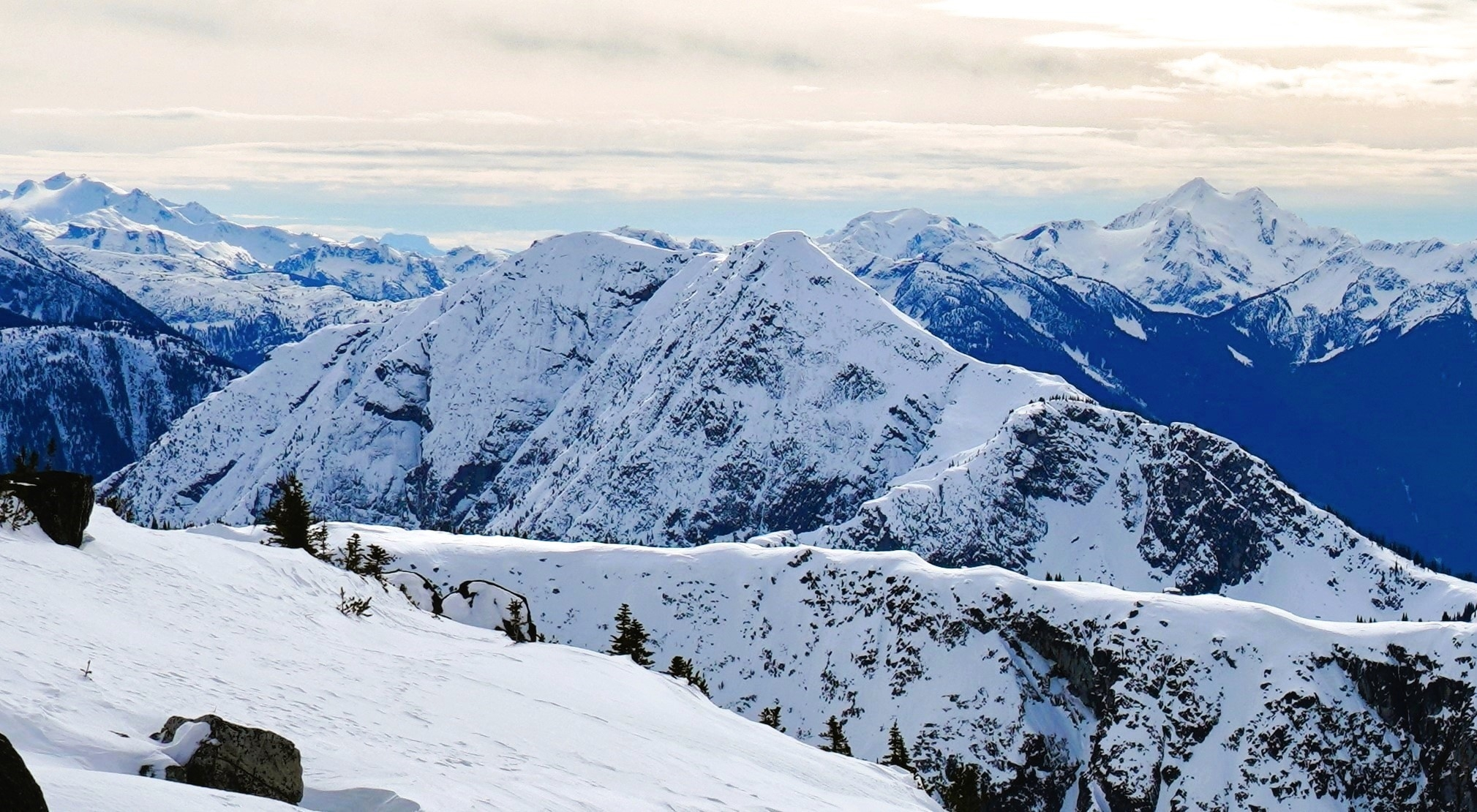
- North-northwest aspect centered (Cloudraker Mountain in upper right)

Highest point
- Elevation: 2,128 m (6,982 ft)
- Prominence: 298 m (978 ft)
- Parent peak: Mount Matier
- Isolation: 2.92 km (1.81 mi)
- Listing: Mountains of British Columbia
- Coordinates: 50°16′51″N 122°28′30″W

Geography
- Location within British Columbia Location within Canada
- Location: British Columbia, Canada
- District: Lillooet Land District
- Parent range: Coast Mountains; Lillooet Ranges; Joffre Group
- Topo map: NTS 92J8 Duffey Lake

Twin Goat Mountain is a 2,128-metre (6,982-foot) summit in British Columbia, Canada.

== Description ==
Twin Goat Mountain is located 24 kilometres (15 mi) east of Pemberton in the Lillooet Ranges of the Coast Mountains. Precipitation runoff from this mountain drains into tributaries of the Lillooet River. Twin Goat Mountain is more notable for its steep rise above local terrain than for its absolute elevation as topographic relief is significant with the summit rising 1,928 metres (6,325 ft) above Lillooet Lake in 3.5 kilometres (2.2 mi). The mountain's toponym was officially adopted January 23, 1979, by the Geographical Names Board of Canada. The mountain was named in association with Twin One Creek, as submitted by Karl Ricker of the Alpine Club of Canada.

== Climate ==
Based on the Köppen climate classification, Twin Goat Mountain is located in the marine west coast climate zone of western North America. Most weather fronts originate in the Pacific Ocean, and travel east toward the Coast Mountains where they are forced upward by the range (orographic lift), causing them to drop their moisture in the form of rain or snowfall. As a result, the Coast Mountains experience high precipitation, especially during the winter months in the form of snowfall. Winter temperatures can drop below −20 °C with wind chill factors below −30 °C.

== See also ==
- Geography of British Columbia
- Geology of British Columbia
