= Cameron Bar Indian Reserve No. 13 =

Indian reserve in British Columbia, Canada

Coordinates: 50°22′00″N 121°41′00″W

Cameron Bar Indian Reserve No. 13, referred to as Cameron Bar 13 for census purposes, is an Indian reserve in the Fraser Canyon region of the Canadian province of British Columbia. As of 2001, the population was 0 (No population change since 1996). The area of the reserve was .35 square kilometres. It is under the administration of the Lytton First Nation based in nearby Lytton, 15 miles to the south, which is a band government of the Nlaka'pamux people.

== Name origin ==
The name of the reserve derives from that of Cameron Bar, a gold-bearing sandbar on the Fraser River below named during the Fraser Canyon Gold Rush of 1858–59.

== Population ==
The reserve's population as of the 2006 census was 0.

== See also ==
- List of communities in British Columbia
