= Cloudraker Mountain =

Mountain in British Columbia, Canada

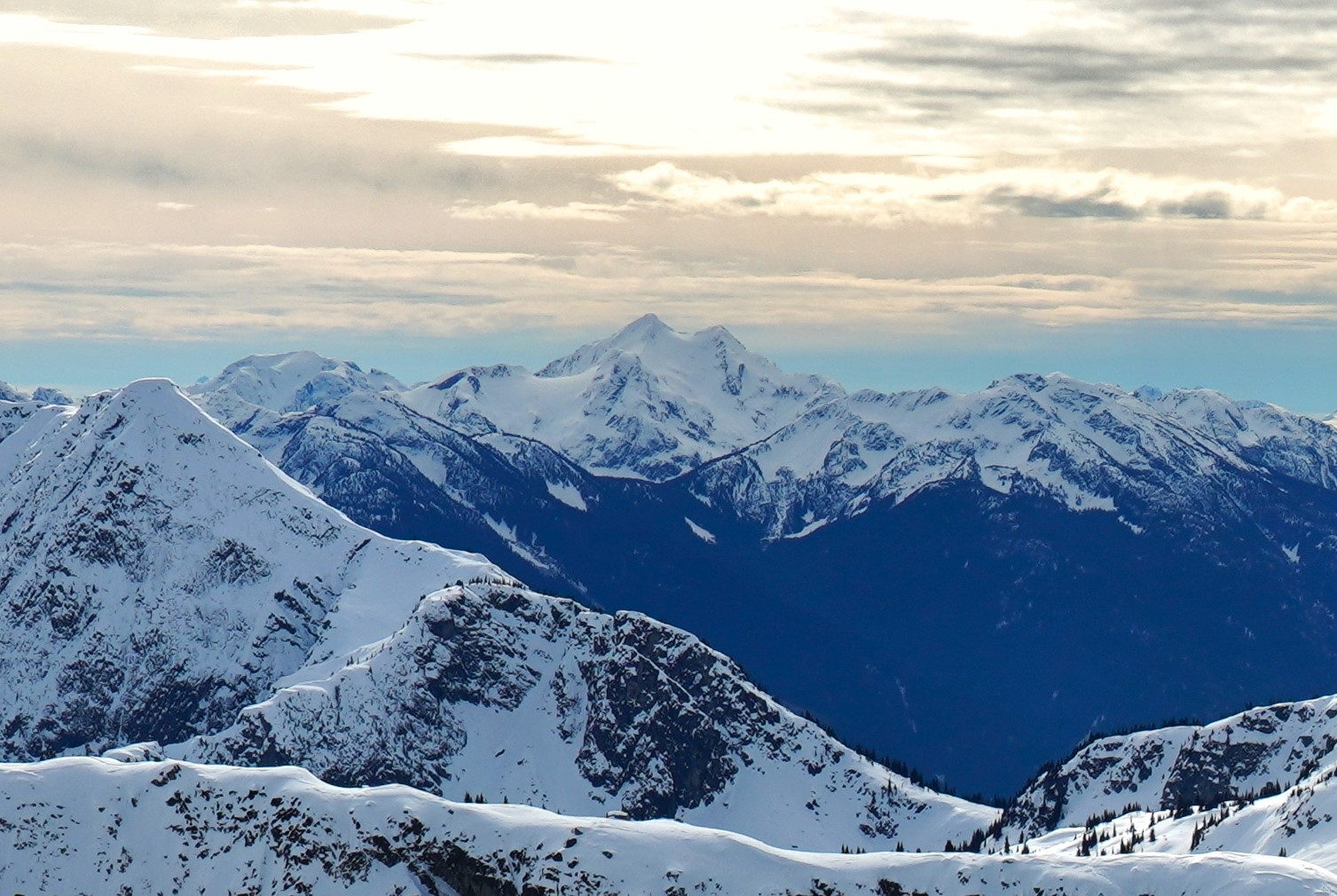
- North aspect centered on skyline, from Mt. Taylor

Highest point
- Elevation: 2,385 m (7,825 ft)
- Prominence: 674 m (2,211 ft)
- Parent peak: Skihist Mountain
- Isolation: 12.09 km (7.51 mi)
- Listing: Mountains of British Columbia
- Coordinates: 50°05′42″N 122°26′26″W

Geography
- Location within British Columbia Location within Canada
- Interactive map of Cloudraker Mountain
- Location: British Columbia, Canada
- District: New Westminster Land District
- Parent range: Coast Mountains; Lillooet Ranges
- Topo map: NTS 92J1 Stein Lake

Climbing
- First ascent: 1967
- Easiest route: Northeast Ridge class 3

Cloudraker Mountain is a 2,385-metre (7,825-foot) glaciated summit in British Columbia, Canada.

== Description ==
Cloudraker Mountain is located in the Lillooet Ranges of the Coast Mountains, 37 kilometres (23 mi) southeast of Pemberton and 37 kilometres (23 mi) east of Whistler. Precipitation runoff and glacial meltwater from this mountain drains into tributaries of the Lillooet River. Cloudraker Mountain is more notable for its steep rise above local terrain than for its absolute elevation as topographic relief is significant with the summit rising 935 metres (3,070 ft) above Tao Lake in less than two kilometres (1.2 mi) and 2,185 metres (7,170 ft) above Lillooet Lake in seven kilometres (4.3 mi). The mountain's toponym was officially adopted March 31, 1969, by the Geographical Names Board of Canada. The mountain's name was submitted by climber Christian Adam whose party made the first ascent of the summit on August 1, 1967. He wrote that the peak's twin summits project through their common glacier and reach up into the clouds.

== Climate ==
Based on the Köppen climate classification, Cloudraker Mountain is located in the marine west coast climate zone of western North America. Most weather fronts originate in the Pacific Ocean, and travel east toward the Coast Mountains where they are forced upward by the range (orographic lift), causing them to drop their moisture in the form of rain or snowfall. As a result, the Coast Mountains experience high precipitation, especially during the winter months in the form of snowfall. Winter temperatures can drop below −20 °C with wind chill factors below −30 °C. This climate supports an unnamed glacier on the north slope of the peak. The months July through September offer the most favorable weather for climbing Cloudraker Mountain.

== See also ==
- Geography of British Columbia
- Geology of British Columbia
