= Upper Rogers kóḻii7 Conservancy =

Conservancy in British Columbia

- IUCN category III (natural monument or feature)
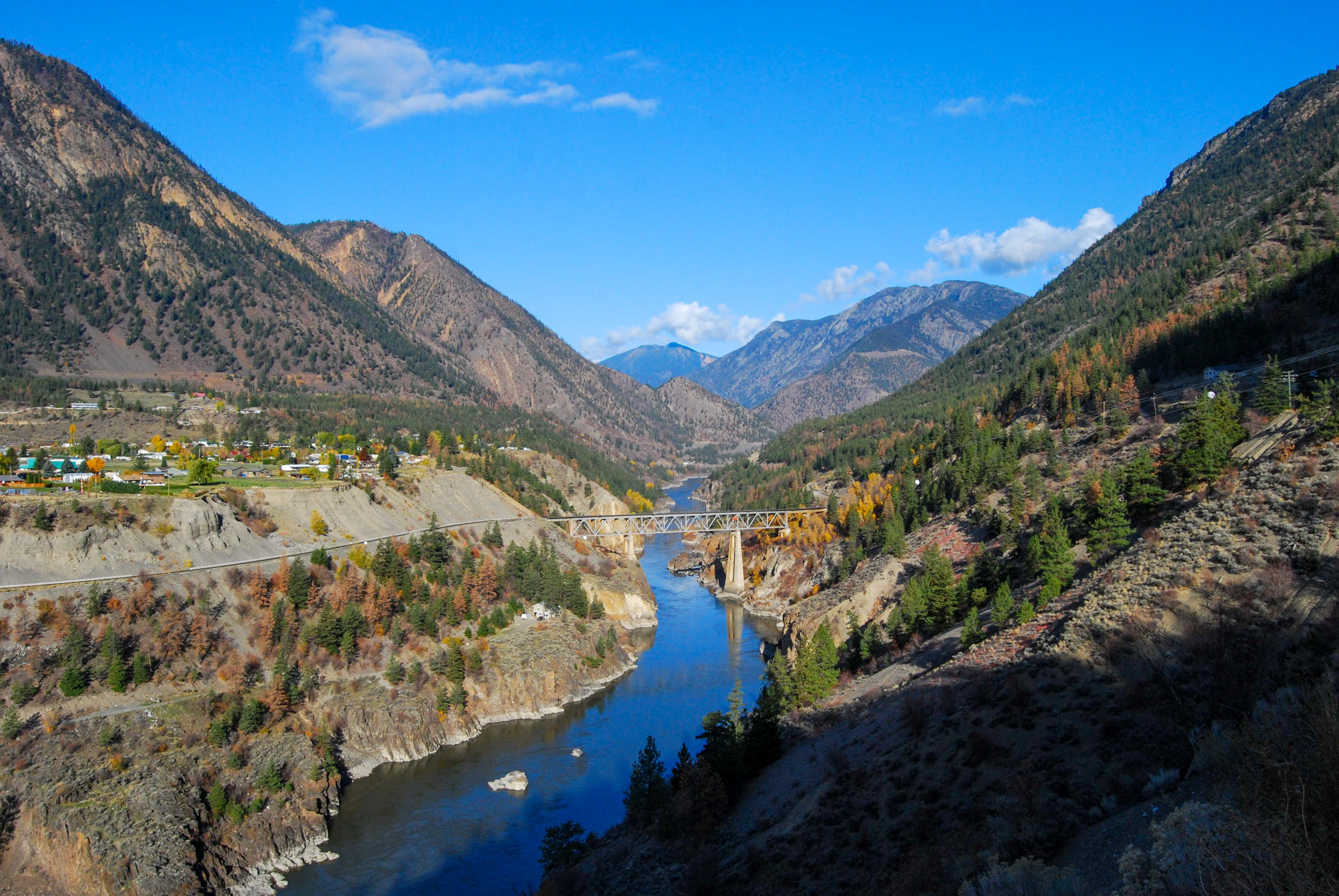
- The Lillooet River, which the water in the conservancy drains into
- Location: British Columbia, Canada
- Nearest city: Pemberton, British Columbia
- Area: 3,601 hectares (8,900 acres)
- Established: June 27, 2008
- Governing body: BC Parks

The Upper Rogers kóḻii7 Conservancy is a nature preserve in southwestern British Columbia near Garibaldi Provincial Park. It is 3,605 hectares (8,910 acres) in area and covers the headwaters of the Rogers Creek watershed, which later drains into the Lillooet River. The park is named for the aforementioned watershed and for the Ucwalmicwts word meaning “high green meadow”, chosen to reflect the landscape of the park. It is managed by BC Parks, the provincial park authority.

== First Nations ==
The conservancy protects a large area in the Coast Mountains adjacent to Stein Valley Nlaka'pamux Heritage Park, another protected area that is a part of a series of parks meant to protect natural features of the area and culturally significant places for the First Nations that reside there. The whole Rogers Creek watershed is a historically significant area for the In-SHUCK-ch Nation and there was once a village situated just west of the modern conservancy where the Rogers Creek meets the Lillooet River.

== Physical features ==
Several peaks are located in or on the border of the conservancy, most notably Skook Jim Mountain, which at an elevation of 2,602 m (8,537 ft) is the tallest peak in the park, as well as Caltha Peak, Tynemouth Mountain and more. The area is mostly forested, and there are no trails in the park, meaning that the park also conserves a considerable area for wildlife, such as mountain goats, grizzly bears, and wolverines.

There are also several water features in the area, including the focus and partial namesake of the conservancy, the Rogers Creek, which flows into the Lillooet River and is supplied by several lakes in the park.

== See also ==
- Garibaldi Provincial Park
- Stein Valley Nlaka'pamux Heritage Park
- Lillooet
- Whistler, British Columbia
- Lillooet River
- Fraser River
