= Petlushkwohap Mountain =

Mountain in British Columbia, Canada

- Location within British Columbia

Highest point
- Elevation: 2,939 m (9,642 ft)
- Prominence: 514 m (1,686 ft)
- Listing: Mountains of British Columbia
- Coordinates: 50°13′19″N 121°52′01″W

Geography
- Country: Canada
- Province: British Columbia
- District: Yale Division Yale Land District
- Parent range: Cantilever Range
- Topo map: NTS 92I4 Lytton

Climbing
- First ascent: 1935 Dominion Topographic Survey

Petlushkwohap Mountain is a mountain in the Cantilever Range, located west of the town of Lytton, British Columbia, Canada, in that province's Fraser Canyon region. The Cantilever Range is a small subrange of the Lillooet Ranges, the southeasternmost subrange of the Pacific Ranges of the Coast Mountains. Petlushkwohap is the second-highest summit in the Lillooet Ranges, after nearby Skihist Mountain and is one of the mountains within the Stein Valley Nlaka'pamux Heritage Park.
