= Nahatlatch River =

Location
- Country: Canada
- Province: British Columbia
- District: Yale Division Yale Land District

Physical characteristics
- Source: Lillooet Ranges
  - location: Coast Mountains
  - coordinates: 50°5′10″N 122°14′50″W
  - elevation: 1,925 m (6,316 ft)
- Mouth: Fraser River
  - location: north of Boston Bar, Fraser Canyon
  - coordinates: 49°58′37″N 121°30′36″W
  - elevation: 100 m (330 ft)
- Discharge
  - location: below Tachewana Creek
  - average: 35.7 m^{3}/s (1,260 cu ft/s)
  - minimum: 3.11 m^{3}/s (110 cu ft/s)
  - maximum: 323 m^{3}/s (11,400 cu ft/s)

The Nahatlatch River is a tributary of the Fraser River in the Canadian province of British Columbia. It originates in the Lillooet Ranges of the Coast Mountains and empties into the Fraser River in the Fraser Canyon, north of Boston Bar.

== Course ==
The Nahatlatch's River originates in the Lillooet Ranges. It flows southeast, the northeast, collecting tributaries such as Mehatl Creek, Tachewana Creek, and Squakum Creek. It flows through Nahatlatch Lake, Hannah Lake, and Frances Lake. After the lakes the Nahatlatch River flows generally east to join the Fraser River in the Fraser Canyon.

The Mehatl Creek watershed is within Mehatl Creek Provincial Park. The Nahatlatch Provincial Park and Protected Area encompasses the Nahatlatch River's valley from Mehall Creek to Nahatlatch, Hannah, and Frances Lakes.

== See also ==
- List of tributaries of the Fraser River
- List of rivers of British Columbia
