= Lytton First Nation =

First Nation government in British Columbia, Canada

- Headquarters: Lytton, British Columbia
- Province: British Columbia

Website
- http://www.lyttonfirstnations.ca/

Lytton First Nation (Thompson: ƛ̓q̓əmci̓n), a First Nations band government, has its headquarters at Lytton in the Fraser Canyon region of the Canadian province of British Columbia. It is the largest of all Nlaka'pamux bands of the Nlaka'pamux (Thompson) people. Lytton First Nation is a member of the Nlaka'pamux Nation Tribal Council a Nlaka'pamux tribal council, they are not a member of the Nicola Tribal Association or the Fraser Canyon Indian Administration.

Lytton First Nation figures prominently in the history of the Fraser Canyon Gold Rush (1858–1860) and of the associated Fraser Canyon War (1858). At Lytton, then still called Kumsheen, leaders of the miners' regiments from Yale met with the chiefs of the Nlaka'pamux to parley an end to the war. While other chiefs argued for annihilation of the outsiders, the Kumsheen chief Spintlum (Cxpentlm, aka David Spintlum) argued for peace, resulting in a series of six treaties known as the Snyder Treaties, which are lost to history.

== Reserves ==
Indian reserves under the governance of Lytton First Nation are:

- Bootahnie Indian Reserve No. 15, 6 miles north of Botanie Lake, 1554.0 ha. 50°24′00″N 121°32′00″W
- Cameron Bar Indian Reserve No. 13, on the right (west) bank of the Fraser River 13 miles north of Lytton, 35.20 ha.
- Fish Lake Indian Reserve No. 7, on Cinquefoil Creek, at the south end of Cinquefoil Lake, 32.40 ha. 50°36′00″N 121°48′00″W
- Halhalaeden Indian Reserve No. 14, on the left (east) bank of the Fraser River, 5 miles north of Lytton, 37.40 ha. 50°18′00″N 121°38′00″W
- Halhalaeden Indian Reserve No. 14A, on the left bank of the Fraser River, 5 miles north of Lytton, 105.10 ha. 50°18′00″N 121°37′00″W
- Inkluckcheen Indian Reserve No. 21, 3 miles north of Lytton, 221.20 ha. 50°16′00″N 121°35′00″W
- Inkluckcheen Indian Reserve No. 21B, on the right bank of the Fraser River, 4 miles north of Lytton, 169.60 ha. 50°17′00″N 121°36′00″W
- Kitzowit Indian Reserve No. 20, 2 miles south of Lytton, 1/2 mile east of the Fraser River, 11.0 ha. 50°12′00″N 121°34′00″W
- Klahkamich Indian Reserve No. 17, on the north side of Lytton Creek, 9.10 ha. 50°14′00″N 121°35′00″W
- Kleetlekut Indian Reserve No. 22, 2 miles north of Lytton, 121.40 ha. 50°16′00″N 121°34′00″W
- Kleetlekut Indian Reserve No. 22A, south of and adjoining IR No. 22, 68.50 ha. 50°15′00″N 121°34′00″W
- Klickkumcheen Indian Reserve No. 18, at junction of the Thompson and Fraser Rivers, NE of Lytton, 15.60 ha. 50°14′00″N 121°35′00″W
- Lytton Indian Reserve No. 13A, 6 miles northwest of and adjoining Cameron Bar IR No. 13, 18.20 ha. 50°24′00″N 121°41′00″W
- Lytton Indian Reserve No. 21A, 3 miles north of Lytton, 61.0 ha. 50°17′00″N 121°35′00″W
- Lytton Indian Reserve No. 26A, on the right bank of the Fraser River 3 miles below Lytton, 81.50 ha. 50°11′00″N 121°36′00″W
  - Lytton Indian Reserve No. 27B, 1 mile northwest of Lytton, 24.60 ha. 50°14′00″N 121°36′00″W
- Lytton Indian Reserve No. 30, in the vicinity of Nickle Palm Reserve No. 4, 4.0 ha.
- Lytton Indian Reserve No. 31, 2 miles southwest of Lytton, west of and adjoining Nickeyear IR No. 25, 83.50 ha. 50°12′00″N 121°36′00″W
- Lytton Indian Reserve No. 32, on the left bank of the Fraser River 14 miles northerly from Lytton, 42.90 ha. 50°25′00″N 121°41′00″W
- Lytton Indian Reserve No. 33, 1 mile west of the Fraser River on Siwhe Creek, 131.90 ha. 50°25′00″N 121°43′00″W
- Lytton Indian Reserve No. 3A, on the left bank of the Fraser River 9 miles north of Lytton, 45.0 ha. 50°24′00″N 121°41′00″W
- Lytton Indian Reserve No. 4A, on the south bank of Intlpam Creek, southwest of and adjoining Nickle Palm Reserve No. 4, 154.90 ha. 50°27′00″N 121°43′00″W
- Lytton Indian Reserve No. 4B, between north and south forks of Intlpam Creek, 54.80 ha. 50°27′00″N 121°43′00″W
- Lytton Indian Reserve No. 4C, on the north bank of Intlpam Creek west of and adjoining Nickle Palm IR No. 4, 25.30 ha. 50°27′00″N 121°43′00″W
- Lytton Indian Reserve No. 4D, half mile west of the Fraser River, 48.60 ha. 50°28′00″N 121°43′00″W
- Lytton Indian Reserve No. 4E, 1/4 mile west of the Fraser River, 89.0 ha. 50°26′00″N 121°42′00″W
- Lytton Indian Reserve No. 4F, on the right bank of the Fraser River 1 mile south of the mouth of Siwhe Creek, 29.70 ha. 50°25′00″N 121°42′00″W
- Lytton Indian Reserve No. 5A, on the right bank of the Fraser River northwest of and adjoining Seah IR No. 5, 48.60 ha. 50°31′00″N 121°45′00″W
- Lytton Indian Reserve No. 9A, on the right bank of the Fraser River 6 miles north of Lytton, 159.80 ha. 50°18′00″N 121°39′00″W
- Lytton Indian Reserve No. 9B, west of the Fraser River, south of and adjoining Stryen Indian Reserve No. 9, 71.40 ha. 50°16′00″N 121°37′00″W
- Maka Indian Reserve No. 8, 1/4 mile west of the Thompson River, 2 miles northeast of Lytton, 3.20 ha. 50°16′00″N 121°33′00″W
- Nananahout Indian Reserve No. 1, at the north end of Pasulko Lake, 312.80 ha. 50°26′00″N 121°34′00″W
- Nesikep Indian Reserve No. 6, on both banks of the Fraser River, 12 miles south of Lillooet, 312. 80 ha. 50°33′00″N 121°47′00″W
- Nesikep Indian Reserve No. 6A, on the left bank of the Fraser River north of and adjoining IR No. 6, 153.40 ha. 50°34′00″N 121°47′00″W
- Ngwyu'Yemc Indian Reserve No. 36, 116.70 ha. 50°18′13″N 121°33′20″W
- Nickel Palm Indian Reserve No. 4, on the right bank of the Fraser River at the mouth of Intlpam Creek, 45.0 ha. 50°27′00″N 121°42′00″W
- Nickeyeah Indian Reserve No. 25, on the right bank of the Fraser River 2 miles south of Lytton, 74.30 ha. 50°12′00″N 121°35′00″W
- Nkaih Indian Reserve No. 10, on the right bank of the Fraser River 8 miles above Lytton, 113.70 ha. 50°19′00″N 121°39′00″W
- Nocten Indian Reserve No. 19, on the right bank of the Thompson River 4 miles northeast of Lytton, 1.40 ha. 50°16′00″N 121°31′00″W
- Nohomeen Indian Reserve No. 23, on the right bank of the Fraser River 1 mile north of Lytton, 13.0 ha. 50°15′00″N 121°36′00″W
- Nuuautin Indian Reserve No. 2, on the left bank of the Fraser River 2 miles above Lytton, 193.0 ha. 50°16′00″N 121°35′00″W
- Nuuautin Indian Reserve No. 2A, on the left bank of the Fraser River south of and adjoining IR No. 2, 30.40 ha. 50°15′00″N 121°35′00″W
- Nuuautin Indian Reserve No. 2B, north of and adjoining IR No. 2, 3 miles north of Lytton, 63.10 ha. 50°16′00″N 121°35′00″W
- Papyum Indian Reserve No. 27, on the right bank of the Fraser River, west of Lytton, 52.20 ha. 50°14′00″N 121°35′00″W
- Papyum Indian Reserve No. 27A, west of the Fraser River and the town of Lytton, 84.90 ha. 50°14′00″N 121°36′00″W
- Papyum Graveyard Indian Reserve No. 27C, 1 mile northwest of Lytton, 4.10 ha. 50°14′00″N 121°35′00″W
- Seah Indian Reserve No. 5, on the right bank of the Fraser River, opposite the mouth of McGillivray Creek, 133.10 ha. 50°30′00″N 121°44′00″W
- Skwayaynope Indian Reserve No. 26, on the right bank of the Fraser River, 2 miles south of Lytton, 80.20 ha. 50°12′00″N 121°35′00″W
- Spintlum Flat Indian Reserve No. 3, on the left bank of the Fraser River, 8 miles above Lytton, 137.0 ha. 50°20′00″N 121°39′00″W
- Stryen Indian Reserve No. 9, at the mouth of the Stein River, right bank of the Fraser River, 254.80 ha. 50°17′00″N 121°38′00″W
- Tsaukan Indian Reserve No. 12, on the right bank of the Fraser River, 57.0 ha.50°22′00″N 121°41′00″W
- Tuckozap Indian Reserve No. 24, on the right bank of the Thompson River, at the junction with the Fraser River, 78.10 ha.50°14′00″N 121°35′00″W
- Two Mile Creek Indian Reserve No. 16, on the left bank of the Thompson River, 2 miles northeast of Lytton, 4.0 ha.50°15′00″N 121°33′00″W
- Two Mile Creek Indian Reserve No. 16A, on the left bank of the Fraser River, south and east of IR No. 16, 11.20 ha.50°15′00″N 121°33′00″W
- Yawaucht Indian Reserve No. 1, on the right bank of the Fraser River, north of Nekertch Creek, 117.10 ha.50°21′00″N 121°40′00″W

== See also ==
- Thompson language
