= Skihist Provincial Park =

Provincial park in British Columbia, Canada

- IUCN category II (national park)
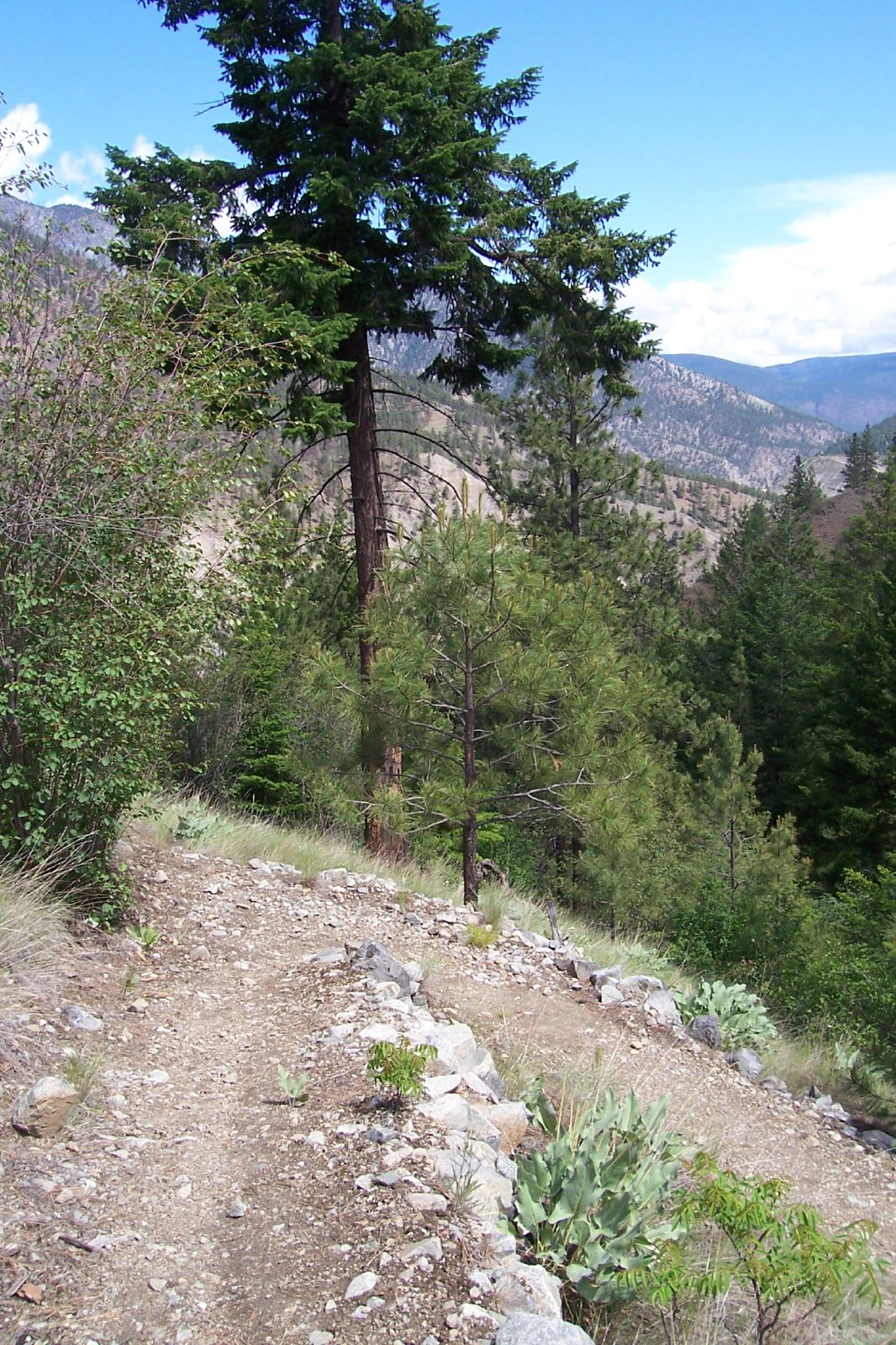
- Pine trees in Skihist Provincial Park

- Location within British Columbia
- Interactive map of Skihist Provincial Park
- Location: Lytton, British Columbia
- Coordinates: 50°14′39″N 121°30′54″W
- Area: 386 ha (950 acres)
- Designation: Provincial Park
- Created: 1956
- Governing body: BC Parks

Skihist Provincial Park is a provincial park in British Columbia, Canada, located on the Thompson River and adjacent to the Trans-Canada Highway #1 between the towns of Lytton (W) and Spences Bridge (E). The park is named for Skihist Mountain, which is visible from the park though on the opposite side of the Fraser River to the west of Lytton.

== History ==
Skihist Provincial Park was established in 1956 as a rest stop and overnight camping location along highway 1.

== Facilities ==
=== Day-Use ===
Adjacent to the highway, a rest area with water and flush toilets is available. There are standard parking spots as well as trailer parking spots. The rest area closes for the winter season. The park is open from May to September.

=== Camping ===
Skihist Campground is located near the day-use area on the opposite side of Highway #1. It is open during the Summer season. There are 58 campsites.
