= Skihist Mountain =

Mountain in British Columbia, Canada

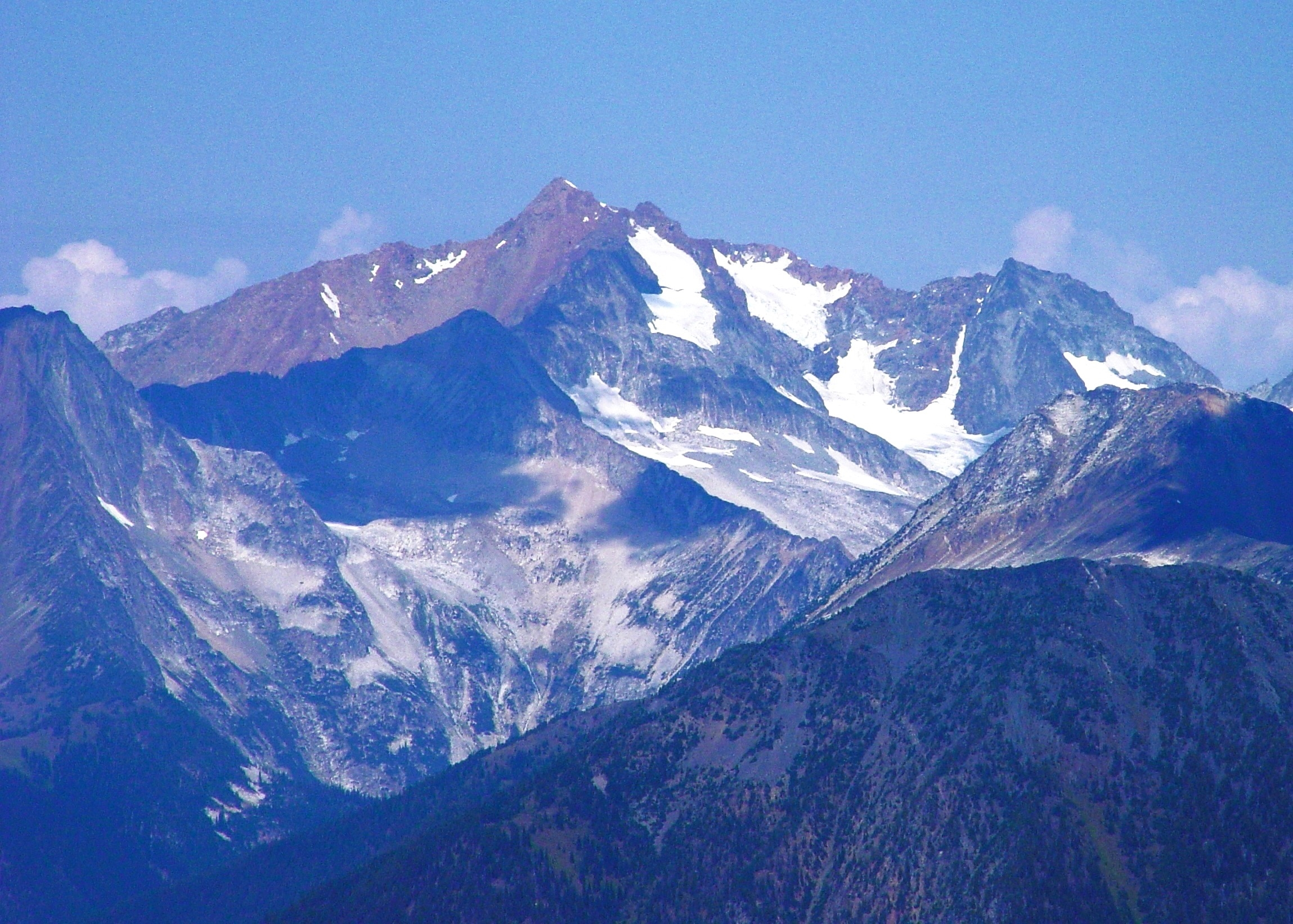
- Southeast aspect

Highest point
- Elevation: 2,968 m (9,738 ft)
- Prominence: 2,463 m (8,081 ft)
- Parent peak: Mount Daphnis (3006 m)
- Listing: Mountains of British Columbia; North America prominent peak 38th; Canada highest major peaks 70th; Canada most prominent peak 12th; Canada most isolated peaks 37th
- Coordinates: 50°11′15″N 121°54′11″W

Geography
- Location within British Columbia
- Interactive map of Skihist Mountain
- Country: Canada
- Province: British Columbia
- District: Kamloops Division Yale Land District
- Parent range: Cantilever Range, Lillooet Ranges; Coast Mountains
- Topo map: NTS 92I4 Lytton

Climbing
- First ascent: Unrecorded (prospectors or First Nations)

Skihist Mountain, also sometimes referred to as Skihist Peak, is the highest mountain in the Cantilever Range and in southwestern British Columbia, Canada. It is located on the southern boundary of Stein Valley Nlaka'pamux Heritage Park, about 20 km (12 mi) west of Lytton. It is the highest summit in the Lillooet Ranges, which lie between the Lillooet and Fraser Rivers, south of the Gates Valley and Seton and Anderson Lakes.

Skihist Mountain consists of a north–south aligned ridge. Kent Creek drains its northern slopes while Nesbitt Creek drains the south and west slopes. Both creeks feed the Stein River. On its eastern slopes, it is drained by North Kwoiek Creek, which originates at Skihist Lake, a small mountain lake located approximately three kilometres southeast of Skihist's summit.

The peak is most easily climbed via its south slopes, from the North Kwoiek Creek drainage.

== Name origin ==
According to ethnologist James Teit, writing in 1917, the word skihist means "jump" or "leap", referring to a giant in mythological times who leapt back and forth between this summit and Akasik Mountain. Helen and GPW Akrigg, in their British Columbia Place Name book, say it is from Sk-haest, meaning "peak between two ridges".

Skihist Provincial Park is not near the mountain, but on the other side of the Fraser and up the Thompson River some distance, but is so named because it has a good view of this summit.

== Gallery ==
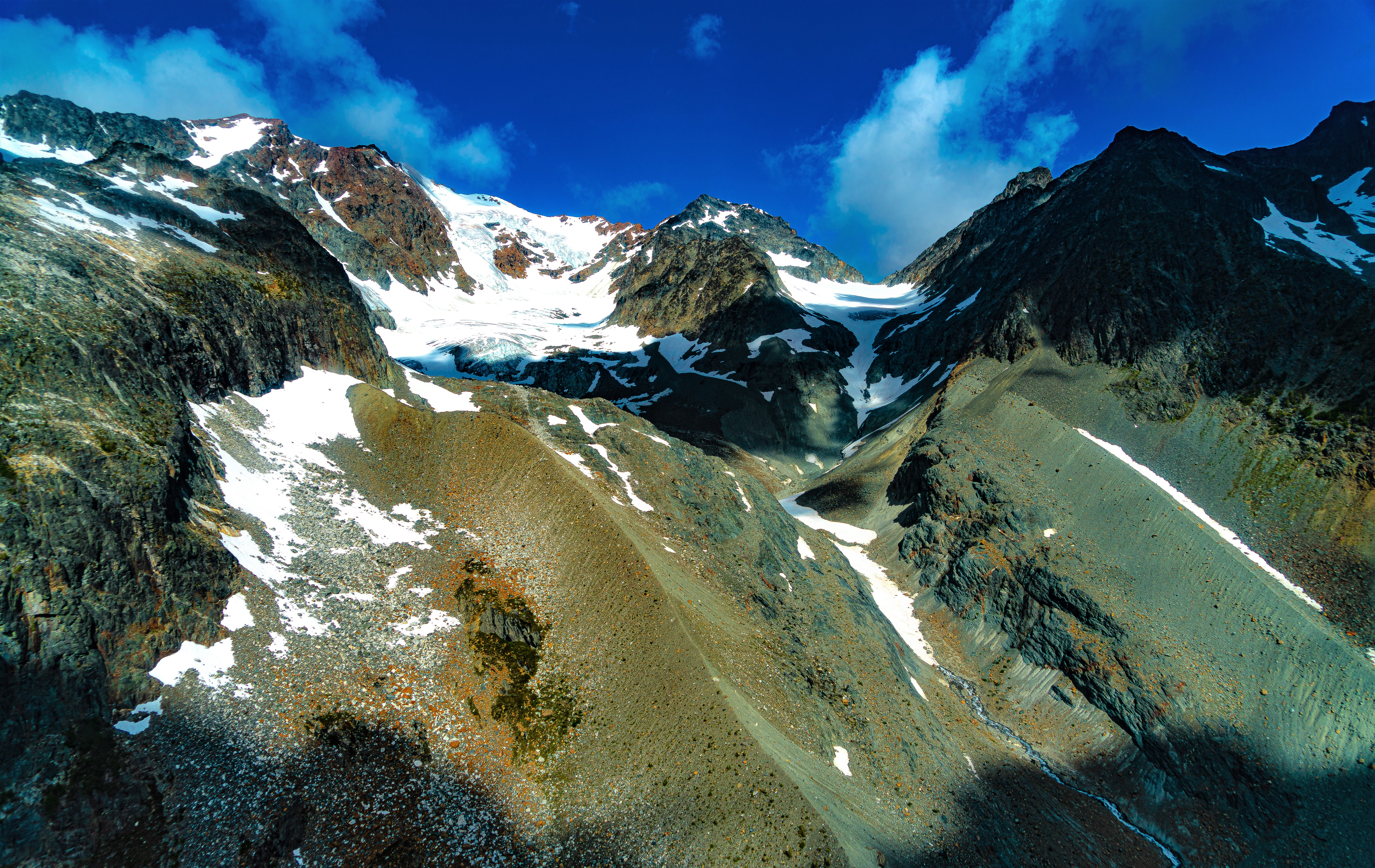
East slope, summit at upper left

== See also ==
- Geography of British Columbia
- Petlushkwohap Mountain
- Claimpost Peak
