= Nesikep =

Coordinates: 50°33′00″N 121°47′00″W

Location of Nesikep in British Columbia

Nesikep is an unincorporated settlement in British Columbia, Canada, located at the mouth of Nesikep Creek in the Fraser Canyon, to the south of Lillooet and southeast of Texas Creek. It is primarily defined by Nesikep Indian Reserve No. 6 and Nesikep Indian Reserve No. 6A. Nesikep Indian Reserve No. 6 flanks both sides of the Fraser, though the community is only on the right (west) bank.

== See also ==
- List of communities in British Columbia
