= Mehatl Creek Provincial Park =

Provincial park in British Columbia, Canada

- IUCN category II (national park)
- Location within British Columbia Location within Fraser Valley Regional District
- Interactive map of Mehatl Creek Provincial Park
- Location: Fraser Valley RD, British Columbia, Canada
- Coordinates: 50°03′00″N 122°02′00″W
- Area: 23,860 ha (92.1 sq mi)
- Established: July 28, 1997
- Governing body: BC Parks
- Website: Mehatl Creek Provincial Park

Mehatl Creek Provincial Park is a provincial park in British Columbia, Canada, located in the central Lillooet Ranges to the west of Boston Bar.
