= Stein Valley Nlaka'pamux Heritage Park =

British Columbia provincial park

- IUCN category Ib (wilderness area)
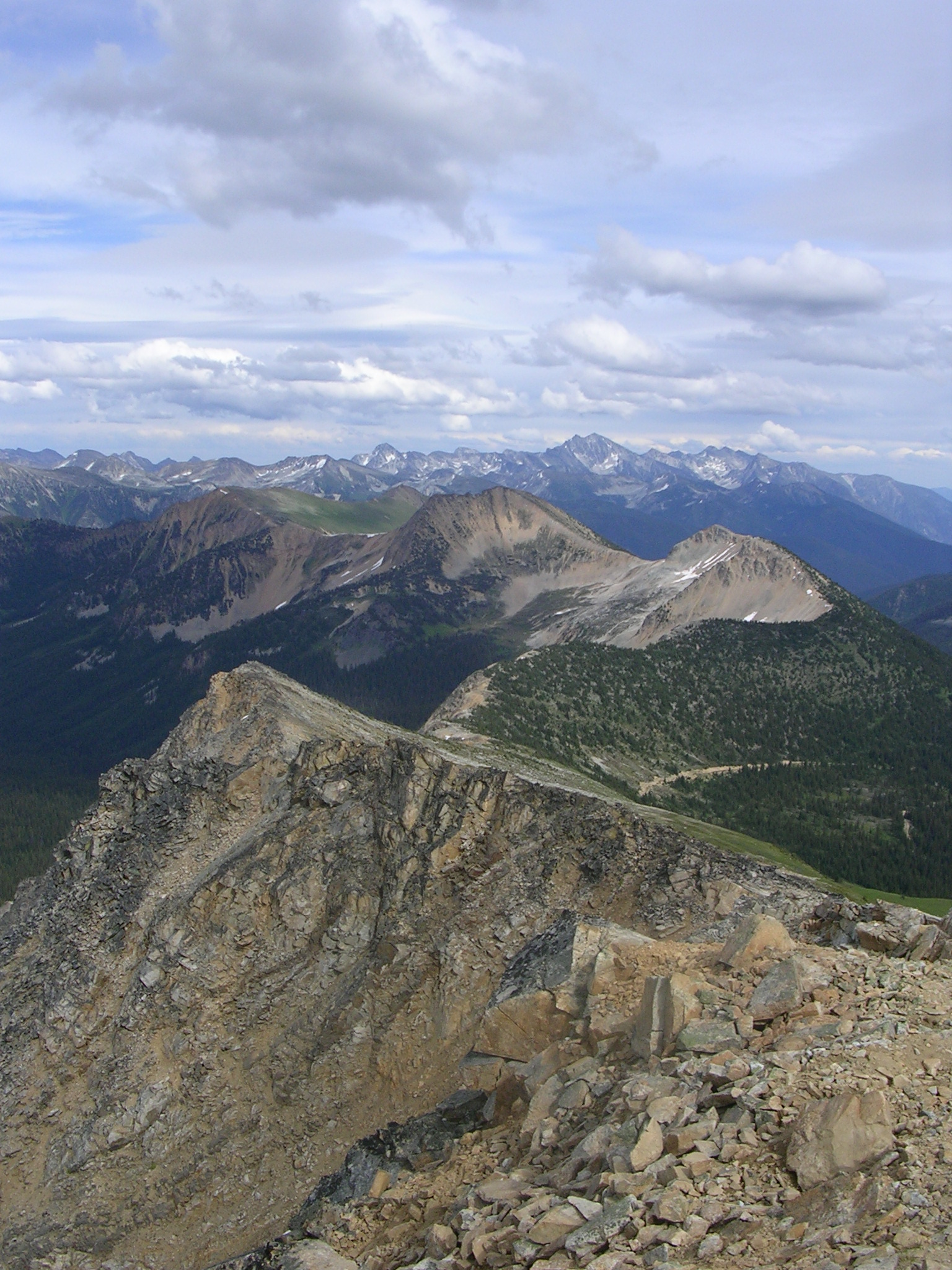
- View from Gott Peak

- Location within British Columbia
- Interactive map of Stein Valley Nlaka'pamux Heritage Park
- Location: Thompson-Nicola, British Columbia
- Nearest city: Lytton
- Coordinates: 50°15′10″N 121°57′03″W
- Area: 107,191 ha (413.87 sq mi)
- Designation: Class A Provincial Park
- Established: July 12, 1995
- Governing body: BC Parks & Lytton First Nation

The Stein Valley Nlaka’pamux Heritage Park is located near Lytton, British Columbia. The park was established in 1995. The park is co-managed, operated, and planned through a partnership between the Lytton First Nation and the government of British Columbia. The park provides recreational opportunities and cultural heritage activities, and features a number of pictographs.

The Stein River and the surrounding watershed contain a variety of flora and fauna and have great cultural significance for the Lytton First Nations people. Stein Valley has been a sacred place and a significant source of sustenance for the Nlaka’pamux community for thousands of years. The valley borders the territories of the Lil'wat and St'at'imc peoples. Historically, it has been used as a travel route through the mountains, as well as a spiritual and cultural site of practice, particularly used for cultural rock paintings and writings.

The park is also used for educational and research purposes. The undistributed biodiversity in the Heritage Park has made it a location for ecological, anthropological, and archaeological research. The facilitation and authorization of such activities is also overlooked by the management board, which consists of three representatives from the Lytton First Nation and three representatives from the British Columbia provincial government.

== Etymology ==
The name “Stein” originates from the Nlaka’pamux word "Stagyn”, meaning "hidden place". It was given to the valley because it is not easily visible from the end of the Stein River where it flows into the Fraser River.

== History ==
The first issues between indigenous and non-indigenous people over public and government use of Stein Valley began as early as 1858, in the Fraser Canyon Gold Rush. However, the conflicts that led to the park's incorporation happened in the late 20th century, when the government of British Columbia intended to log the valley, but faced opposition from both Nlakaʼpamux people and environmental activists. While provincial government had already intended to log the valley in the 1920s, it was not able to do so because of the high cost. Conflicts truly began in the 1960s and 1970s, as logging became more frequent in southern British Columbia, when the provincial government reintroduced the idea of logging Stein valley and completed a study on methods of doing so. Indigenous communities and environmental activists protested this, some environmentalists arguing that the valley was the last untouched watershed in the southern Coast Mountains. Eventually, with the help of a local Fish and Wildlife officer, conservationists Chris Adam and Roy Mason negotiated a 2-year postponement. This postponement was initially intended to be used to explore management options. However, after years of debate, amid strong public support, and after an annual music festival raising awareness, the provincial government decided to protect it as a park on July 12, 1995, and the Stein Valley remains unlogged today.

When the park was established cooperative management agreement was signed with the Lytton First Nations to jointly manage the park. The cooperative management agreement stated that it did not undermine the aboriginal rights and title to the park, and allows members of the Lytton First Nations to continue to extract resources from the park for traditional, ceremonial or social activities. Today, the cooperation is done through management board, consisting of three representatives from the Lytton First Nations and three from the BC Government. The government provides governmental funds to maintain the park, and the management board itself sometimes applies for grants.

== Geography ==
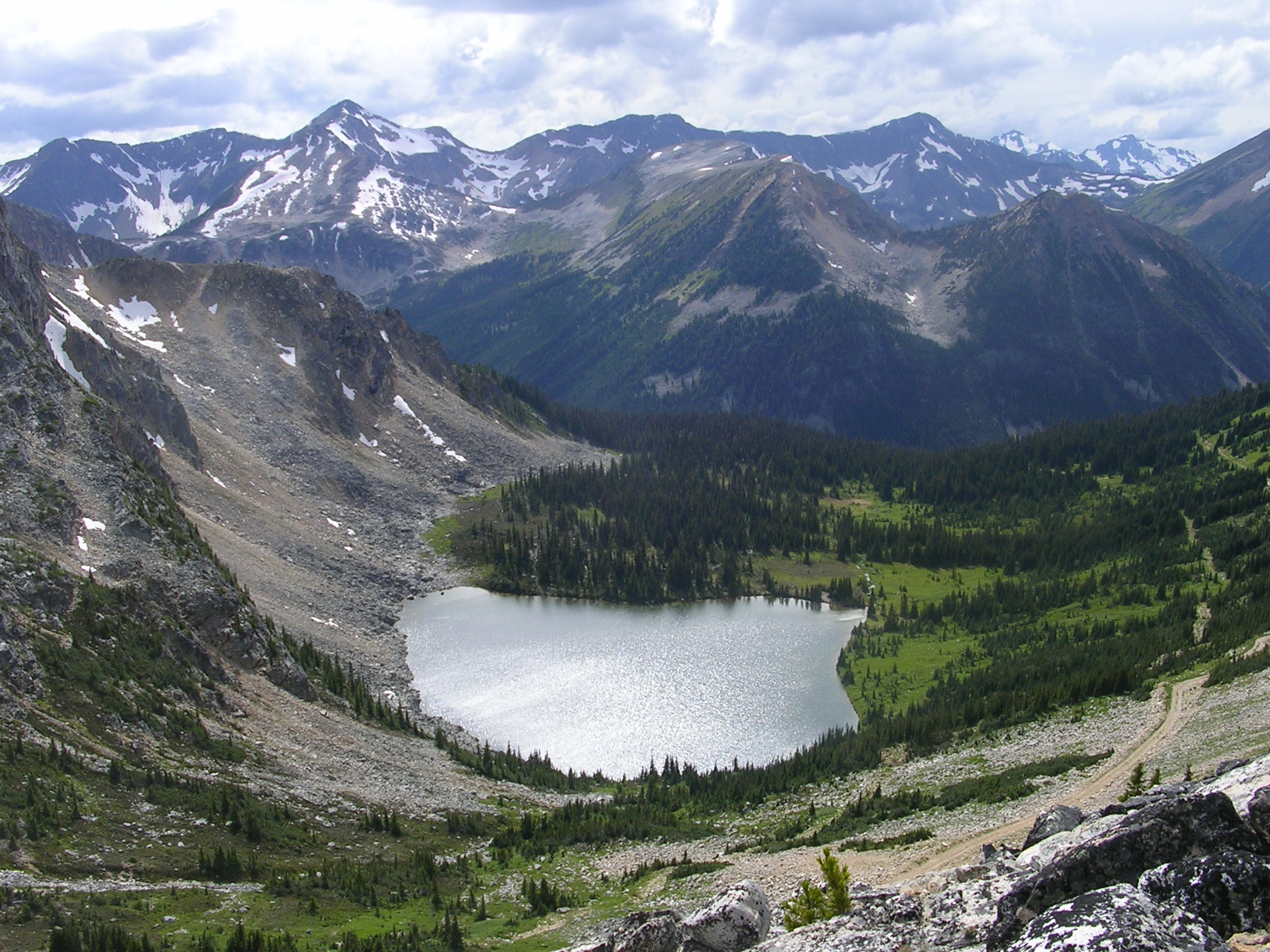
View of Blowdown Lake, from the slopes of Gott Peak.

The park protects the complete Stein River watershed as it flows down from the eastern Pacific Ranges into the Fraser River, including several lakes and tributary creeks. Cirques and tarns are scattered along the upper range of the river watershed. Two canyon sections of the Stein River can be found on the east end and the west end of the valley. The main valleys, not counting the lower canyon, are composed of glacial landforms, U-shaped valleys, and hanging valleys which indicate the existence of vast glacier formation and erosion in the past ecosystem of the Stein Valley. The south-facing slopes in the lower valley are relatively drier and warmer compared to the north-facing slopes, because they are located in the rain shadow of the Coast Mountains. The park's elevation ranges from 220 metres above sea level at the eastern end up to 2,954 metres at the summit of Skihist Mountain.

== Ecology ==
Stein Valley holds a substantial variety of flora and fauna throughout the park. The park is home to over 50 species of mammals, including mountain goats, cougars, wolverines, black bears, and grizzly bears. Bird species include golden eagles, sharp-shinned hawks, barred owls, pygmy owls, white-tailed ptarmigan, pileated woodpeckers and Rufous hummingbirds, as well as several species of chickadees, warblers and nuthatches. In the valley, the Stein River holds resident Dolly Varden char, rainbow trout and Rocky Mountain whitefish, migratory steelhead trout and Coho, Pink and Chinook salmon who return to their home waters to spawn.

The Stein Valley has extraordinarily diverse vegetation communities within the park. This comes from the valley's transition from the dry interior to the coastal mountains and various elevation levels in the park. In the lower valley, ponderosa pine forests dominate. In the mid-valley, Douglas fir forests dominate. On the western side of the valley, there are more hemlock, spruce and fir. In contrast, cedar communities exist not only on the valley's eastern side but also in patches throughout other parts of the valley. black cottonwood communities mixed with birch and aspen are prevalent within the Stein Valley River floodplain. Higher elevations within the park include stands of subalpine fir, whitebark pine, Engelmann spruce, and alpine tundra. During the blooming seasons of spring and summer, you can find a wide variety of blooming flowers throughout the valley, especially at higher elevations.

== Recreation ==
Stein Valley offers hiking, fishing, hunting, camping, and wildlife and cultural artifact viewing. There are about 250 km of trails, and 11 developed campgrounds. As of 2017, there are three cable crossings and a suspension bridge across the Stein River. The Lower Stein Valley, from the Lytton trailhead to the Suspension Bridge Camp, has become popular for school outdoor education groups.

== See also ==
- Mehatl Creek Provincial Park
