= Stein River =

Watercourse in British Columbia, Canada

Coordinates: 50°17′N 121°38′W

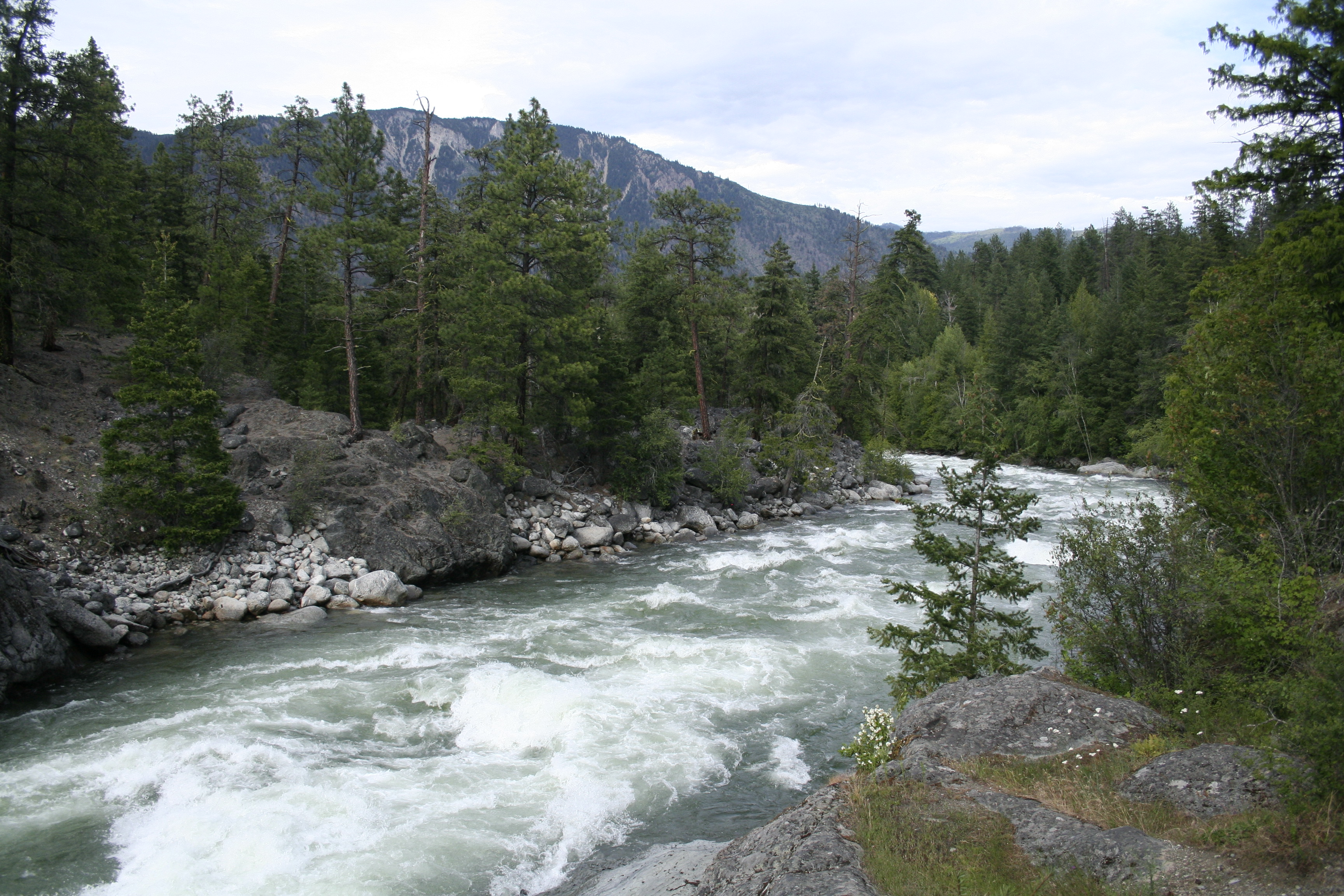
The Stein River.

The Stein River is a tributary of the Fraser River in the Canadian province of British Columbia.

The name is derived from the Nlaka'pamux word Stagyn, meaning "hidden place", referring to the fact that the size and extent of the Stein River valley is not very noticeable from the river's confluence with the Fraser.

It is one of only 2 unlogged watersheds with an area greater than 50 km south of Prince George, BC.

== Course ==
The Stein River and its tributaries are contained in Stein Valley Nlaka'pamux Heritage Park. The river originates in remote Tundra Lake and flows generally east, joining the Fraser River north of Lytton.

== See also ==
- List of rivers of British Columbia
