= Lillooet Ranges =

Mountain range in the country of Canada

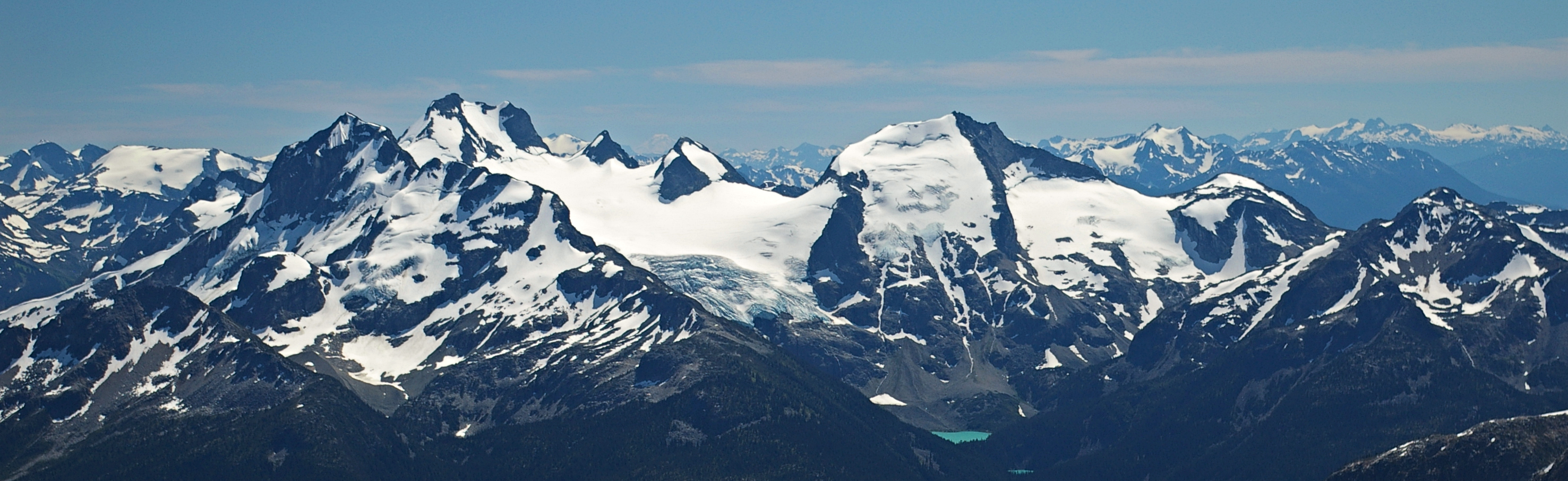
- Joffre Group seen from Mount Marriott. Joffre Peak (left), Mt. Matier (highest), and Slalok Mountain (right)

Highest point
- Peak: Skihist Mountain
- Elevation: 2,968 m (9,738 ft)
- Coordinates: 50°11′15″N 121°54′11″W

Dimensions
- Area: 8,030 km^{2} (3,100 mi^{2})

Geography
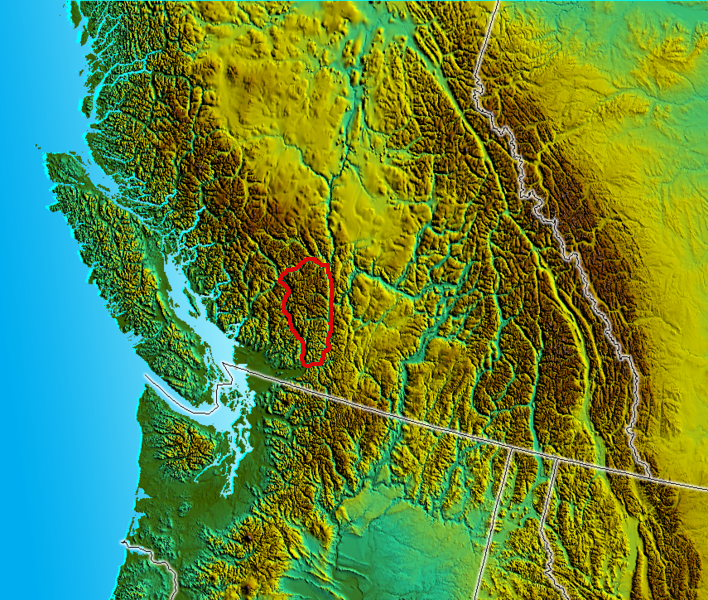
- Locator map of the Lillooet Ranges
- Country: Canada
- Province: British Columbia
- Range coordinates: 49°45′N 121°43′W
- Parent range: Pacific Ranges

The Lillooet Ranges are the southeasternmost subdivision of the Pacific Ranges of the Coast Mountains of British Columbia. They are located between the drainage of the Lillooet River and Harrison Lake on the west and the canyon of the Fraser River on the east, and by the lowland coastal valley of that river on the south.

The Lillooet Ranges are approximately 8100 square kilometres (3150 mi²) in area. The range is extremely rugged and varied in terrain, and includes some of the highest peaks in southwestern British Columbia. The highest is Skihist Mountain, 2,968 m (9,738 ft), crowning the Cantilever Range in the heart of the area to the west of the community of Lytton at the confluence of the Thompson and Fraser Rivers. The northernmost subdivision of the Lillooet Ranges is the Cayoosh Range, which includes the second-highest summit in the Lillooet Ranges, an unnamed 2,855 m (9,367 ft) peak just south of Seton Lake and about 20 km (12 mi) WSW of the town of Lillooet. To the northeast of Harrison Lake, Mount Breakenridge stands 2,395 m (7,858 ft) tall and poses a significant local landslide tsunami risk to the area.

There are a number of provincial parks and recreation areas within the boundaries of the Lillooet Ranges. The largest and most important is the Stein Valley Nlaka'pamux Heritage Park, which takes in the entire Stein River basin, immediately west of Lytton and east of Pemberton-Mount Currie. "The Stein" is the largest unlogged watershed in the southern Coast Mountains and, like the rest of the Lillooet Ranges, varies from coastal-type alpine in the west to desert-canyon arid on its east.

There is only one highway traversing the Lillooet Ranges, Hwy 99 from Mount Currie to Lillooet, via the valley of Cayoosh Creek. North of that highway is the subarea known as the Cayoosh Range, which contains the second-highest peak in the Lillooet Ranges, an unnamed summit just south of Seton Lake.

The main watersheds entirely within the Lillooet Ranges are those of Cayoosh Creek, the Stein River, the Nahatlatch River, and the Silver River (a.k.a. the Big Silver River). Many smaller streams, still of considerable size, are not listed here.
