= Bamberton =

Canadian industrial site

Coordinates: 48°35′09″N 123°31′20″W

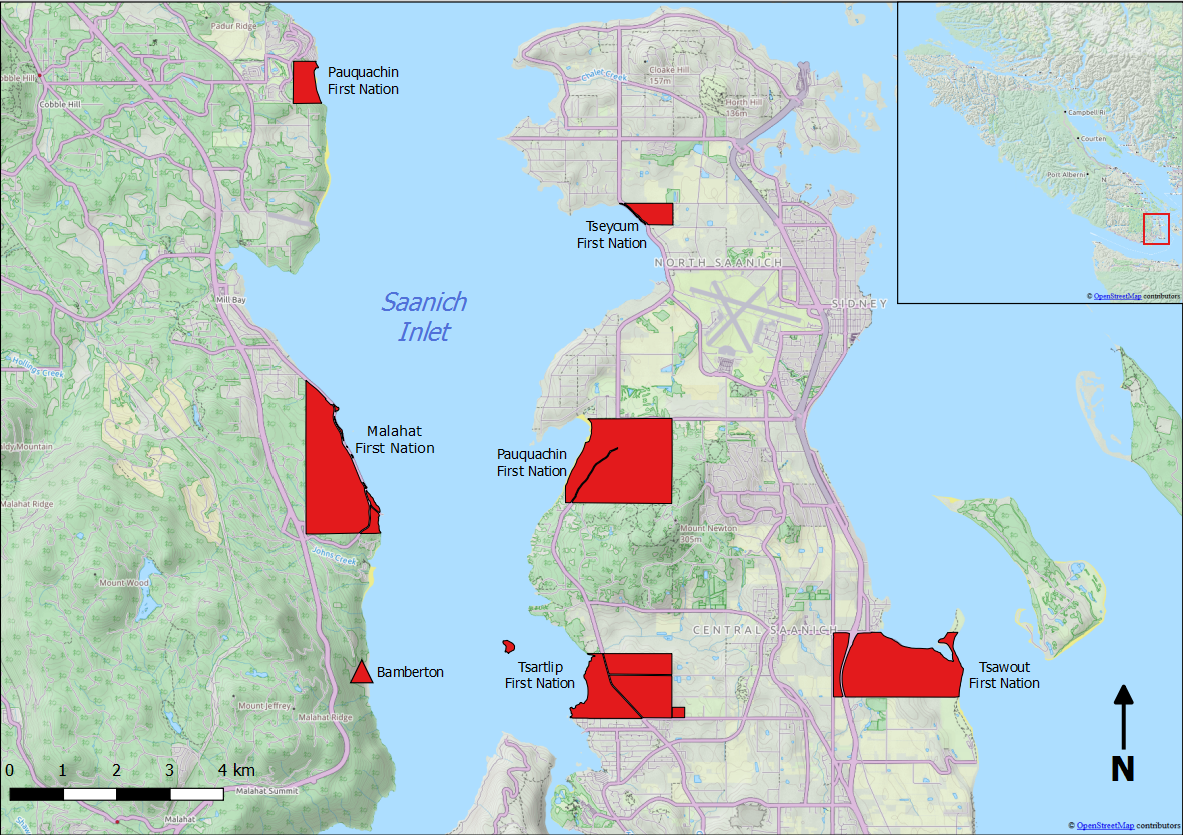
Location of Bamberton and the surrounding First Nation Reserves.

Bamberton is an industrial site located on the Saanich Inlet, just south of Mill Bay, around 45 kilometres north of Victoria on Vancouver Island in British Columbia, Canada.

The community of Bamberton was first developed in 1912 when the Associated Cement Company plant was built. Bamberton was owned by the cement company and occupied by the plant, its employees and their families until the plant closed in 1980.

Since the plant closed, ownership of Bamberton has changed hands multiple times and several development plans have been proposed. In 2015 the Malahat First Nation purchased Bamberton and announced a partnership with Steelhead LNG. With them, they have proposed the creation of a Liquefied natural gas (LNG) facility at the Bamberton site.

== History ==
=== Before the Founding of Bamberton ===
Aboriginal people began to inhabit Vancouver Island around 2000 BCE. The Malahat, Tseycum, Tsartlip, Tsawout, and Pauquachin came to reside along the Saanich Inlet. The land of the Saanich Inlet is a central part of the culture of First Nations people for both spiritual practice and economic subsistence.

From the late 1700s to the mid 1800s, devastating First Nations' population declines occurred throughout B.C. due to disease outbreak and armed conflict as a result of the arrival of European settlers. In 1852, the Saanich First Nations' communities signed the Douglas Treaties selling their land to the Colony of Vancouver Island. In 1913, the McKenna-McBride Commission established the location of present-day reserves, including Tsawout Village at Saanichton Bay, Tseycum Village at Patricia Bay, Pauquachin Village at Coles Bay, Tsartlip Village at Brentwood Bay, Malahat First Nation south of Mill Bay, the Cowichan Lake First Nations, and the Cowichan tribes near Duncan.

Although the Douglas Treaties stipulated that the First Nations people would be able to continue land based ceremonial and subsistence practices, the creation of Indian Reserves led to the encroachment of non-Natives within traditional resource harvesting locations and ongoing projects of civilization that led to land degradation.

Although Bamberton was, and continues to be, privately owned, neighbouring First Nations groups view the land and resources as part of their traditional territory predating ownership. They have always believed that they have claim to the land and a say in its use, and continue to fight for this right under Malahat ownership.

=== Cement: 1912-1980 ===
Bamberton is named for H.K.G. Bamber, a cement manufacturer from Gravesend, England, who was the original owner of the land upon which Bamberton is located and was the managing director of British Portland Cement Manufacturers Ltd..^{[1]} The cement works had their origin across the Saanich Inlet at Tod Inlet in 1904 when the Vancouver Portland Cement Company established operations on the site now occupied by the Butchart Gardens. The demand for cement in the building boom outstripped the capacity of the Tod Inlet operation and led the company to construct a further plant at Bamberton, which opened in 1912 under the name Associated Cement Company. Both companies were operated by B.C. Cement Company Ltd. of Victoria. The outbreak of World War I ended the real estate boom leaving both plants idle for seven years. The plant at Bamberton resumed operations in 1921. By 1927, the Bamberton plant was producing 3,000 barrels per day and used 40,000 tons of Vancouver Island coal each year. The company owned the isolated, self-contained settlement that housed 180 employees at its peak. The community was well equipped and included a recreation hall with a dance floor as large as that of The Empress (hotel). Over the final 20 years of operation, production declined, costs increased, and a protracted strike occurred. In October 1982, the owner, then Genstar Cement Company, advertised for sale the abandoned and overgrown site. Demolition of the mill began within weeks.

== Recent Ownership and Development ==
=== Residential Development Proposals: 1982-2015 ===
Several mixed residential and commercial developments have been proposed for Bamberton. Throughout the late 80's and the 90's The Trust for Sustainable Development proposed a 20 year plan that would see 12,000 future residents. The project met criticism regarding environmental impact on the Saanich Inlet. Its large size raised concerns over traffic and water supply. Ultimately funders decided not to go ahead with the project. Bamberton Properties LLP, an offshoot of Three Point Properties, bought the land in 2005. Bamberton properties spent up to $35 million in clean up costs and spent five years working with the Cowichan Valley Regional District (CVRD) to create a plan that would be approved. The CVRD determined there was no need for additional residential zoned property in the Mill Bay area, and subsequently Bamberton Properties was sold to the Malahat First Nation.

=== Malahat Ownership & Liquid Natural Gas (LNG) Proposal ===
On July 17, 2015, Malahat First Nation announced that they had purchased the Bamberton site, an acquisition that more than tripled the size of their territory. Chief Micheal Harry stated that this acquisition is a "tremendous opportunity" for the Malahat and "beyond exciting for the community". Chief Harry also stated that he hopes the land will bring long term employment opportunities for band members.

Just over a month later, Steelhead LNG Corp. and Malahat First Nation announced the completion of a Mutual Benefits Agreement supporting the proposed development of Malahat LNG, a LNG facility to be located at the Bamberton site. If built, the floating facility will process up to 6 million tonnes per annum. Steelhead anticipates that this project will bring about significant economic benefits, including 30 years of revenue generation for local, provincial and federal governments and the creation of 200 permanent jobs at the facility. In addition, they predict that the project will create hundreds of direct and indirect jobs on Vancouver Island in a wide variety of sectors including design, construction and operations. They also note that training and employment opportunities will be available for both the Malahat First Nations and neighboring First Nations communities.

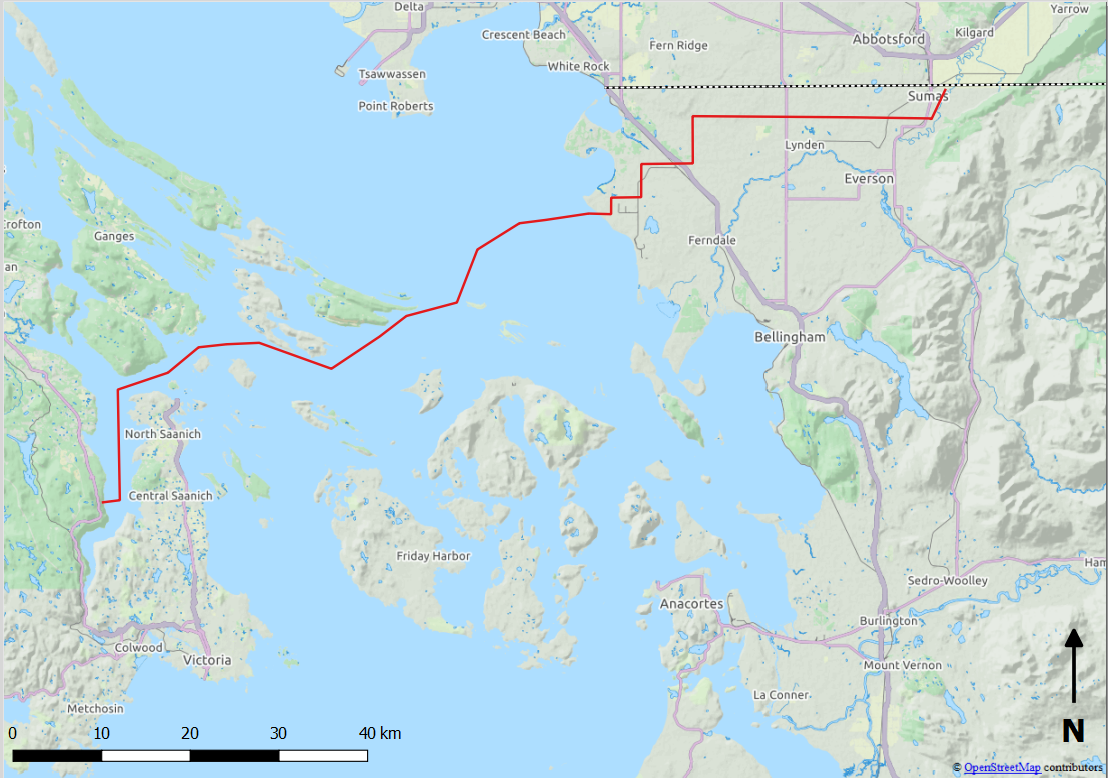
Approximate route of the proposed pipeline.

On September 1, 2015, Steelhead announced that they had partnered with U.S. pipeline developer Williams in order to construct a pipeline to the facility. The 128 km. long proposed pipeline would interconnect with Spectra Energy B.Cs pipeline system at Sumas, Washington and travel over-land in Washington state to Cherry Point Refinery, located 11 km Southwest of Blaine in Whatcom County. From there, the pipeline would be constructed underwater until it reaches the facility at Bamberton.

In October 2015, the project received regulatory approval by the National Energy Board. Steelhead CEO Nigel Kuzemko stated: "We welcome this decision by the National Energy Board, which represents a significant milestone for our company and our projects" and "While these developments and the regulatory approval by the NEB are being well received in the global LNG marketplace, we recognize that we are still at the beginning of a long process that will see us engage and work closely with First Nations, government, communities, residents and regulators to secure the environmental and regulatory approvals we need for our projects to continue to move forward."

The project has generated considerable controversy from other Saanich First nations groups. The chiefs of the Tsarlip, Tsawout, Tseycum and Pauquachin have made it clear that they are united in opposition to the project. "We wanted to make a strong impact statement to make sure our statement is heard ... we are making it well known that we oppose LNG in our territory," said Chief Rebecca David of the Pauquachin First Nation. "The decisions and choices we make today affect the next seven generations. We are trying to protect the water and the lands of our future children." Chief Don Tom of the Tsarlip First Nation was quoted as saying that the pipeline and shipping through the inlet threaten both the environment and their way of life, as the inlet is an important source of food, recreation and spiritual connectivity to their ancestors.

The site shares its name with the nearby Bamberton Provincial Park.
