= T'Sou-ke First Nation =

First Nations government in British Columbia

- Band No. 657
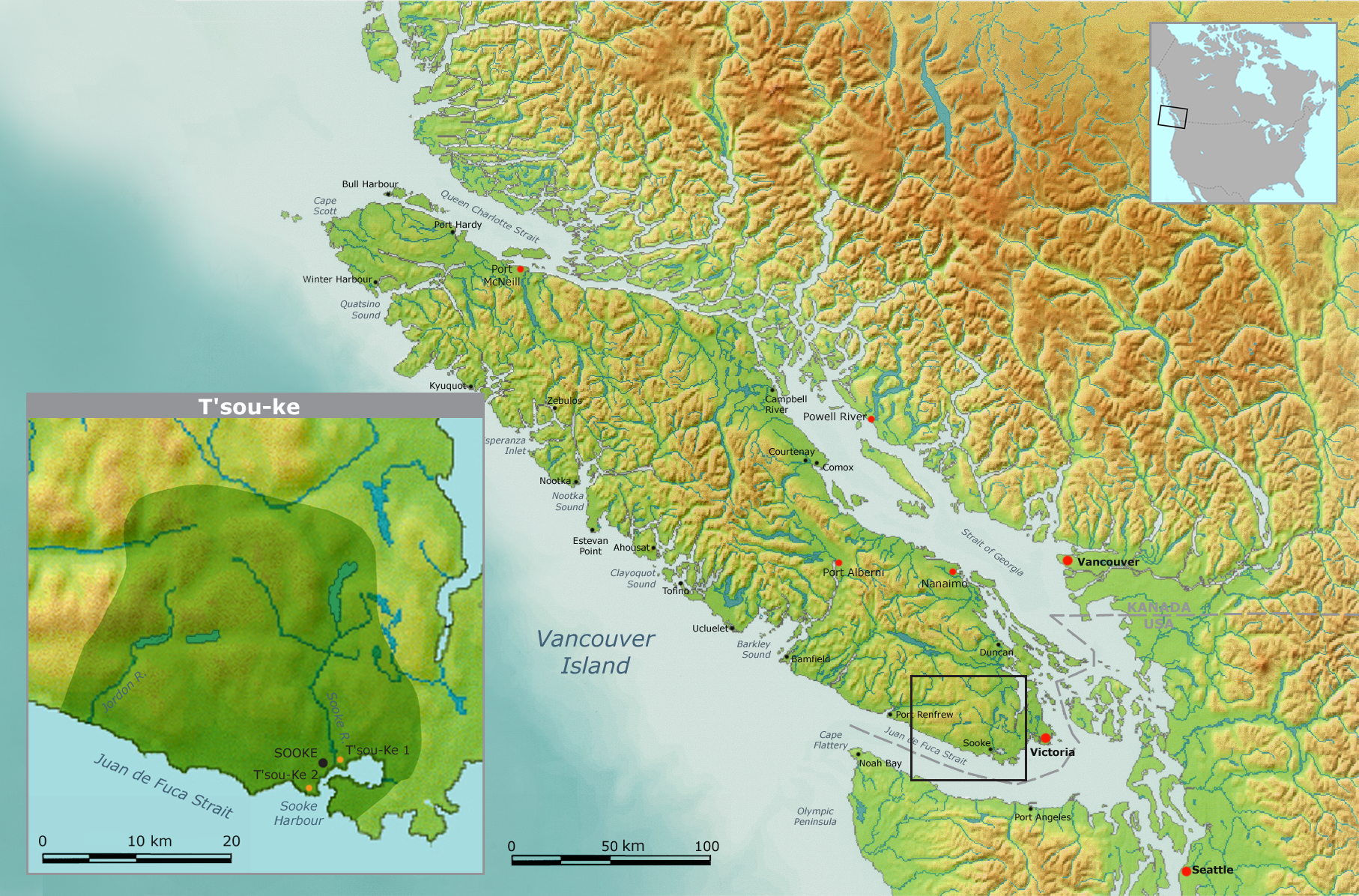
- Province: British Columbia

Land
- Main reserve: T'Sou-ke 1 and 2
- Land area: 0.672 km^{2} (0.259 sq mi)

Population (2024)
- On reserve: 126
- On other land: 4
- Off reserve: 220
- Total population: 350

Government
- Chief: Lawrence Duane Underwood

Tribal Council
- Naut'sa mawt Tribal Council

Website
- www.tsoukenation.com

T'Sou-ke First Nation (formerly known as the T'Sou-ke Indian Band) is a band government whose reserve community is located on Vancouver Island, in the province of British Columbia, Canada. In February 2013, T'Sou-ke Nation had 251 registered members, with two reserves around the Sooke Basin on the Strait of Juan de Fuca at the southern end of Vancouver Island, with a total area of 67 hectares (165 acres). The T'Sou-ke people are the eponym of the town of Sooke, British Columbia and its surrounding harbour and basin.

== Etymology ==
The word T'Sou-ke is an anglicisation derived from the T'Sou-ke word for the Stickleback fish of the area. The older anglicised version of the word, as well as the name of the town is Sooke. The latter may be from the Klallam form súʔəkʷ or a relic of an earlier Northern Straits pronunciation. The current Saanich (SENĆOŦEN) form is SO¸EȻ, pronounced /sáʔəkʷ/.

Alternate anglicisations have included Soke, Sok, Tsohke, and Sock.

== Language ==
The language of T'Sou-ke Nation was historically the T'Sou-ke dialect (SO¸EȻḴEN; /sáʔəkʷqən/) of the Northern Straits Salish language. Along with the T'Sou-ke, varieties of Northern Straits are spoken by the Lekwungen, Saanich (W̱SÁNEĆ), Semiahmoo, Lummi, and Samish peoples.

Today, the T'Sou-ke teach the Saanich dialect. Gordon Planes, chief of T'Sou-ke Nation from 2007 to 2024 stated, "At one time all our people spoke the language and it was not English. It was SENĆOŦEN, the language that we share with our neighbours at Scia'new and others around Victoria and Saanich." No one is currently fluent in the language, but language initiatives are encouraged using current technology, including online tools such as First Voices.

== History ==
The Sooke tribe of Straits Salishans were nearly annihilated in a combined attack of the Cowichans, Clallums and Nitinahts launched about 1848. The people were exposed to Europeans relatively early by association with the Hudson's Bay Company. The nation is a signatory to the Douglas Treaties. When British Columbia joined Canada in 1871, the Province did not recognize Aboriginal title and no further treaties were made. However, "the Province did accept the rights of Aboriginal people as written in the Canadian Constitution and recognized the federal government’s authority to make laws for Aboriginal people and their lands." Accordingly, the existing reserves were allotted by the Joint Reserve Commission in 1877.

=== Treaty negotiations ===
T'Sou-ke Nation is represented, along with four other Coast Salish First Nations, by the Te'mexw Treaty Association along with four other Coast Salish First Nations. They entered the B.C. treaty process in 1995.

On 26 February 2013 T'Sou-ke Nation and the province of British Columbia signed an Incremental Treaty Agreement (ITA). An ITA is a legally-binding pre-treaty agreement negotiated between the province of British Columbia and First Nations at a treaty negotiation table. ITAs are intended to build trust among the parties, create incentives to reach further milestones and provide increased certainty over land and resources. The province reports that "negotiations are making steady progress and have successfully resolved a number of difficult issues that include governance, land, resources and fiscal matters." The negotiations are at stage 4, Agreement-in-Principle.

The Te'mexw Treaty Association reports that the ITA is a multi-year agreement that includes the transfer of two side-by-side 60-hectare parcels of Crown land located at Broom Hill within the nation's traditional territory in the Juan de Fuca Electoral Area. The land transfers are intended to provide the T'Sou-ke Nation with forestry and light industrial development opportunities that support employment and new sources of revenue. The lands will be held in fee simple by the T'Sou-ke Nation, under a First Nation-designated company, and will be subject to the same federal and provincial laws and municipal bylaws and regulations as with any other privately held property.

== Governance ==
T'Sou-ke Nation is governed by the chief and two councillors elected every two years under the Indian Act election system. In February 2014, Chief Gordon Planes was re-elected for his fourth term since 2008. Councillors are Rose Dumont and Bonnie Arden.

At the regional level, T'Sou-ke Nation is represented by the Naut'sa mawt Tribal Council, where Chief Planes currently serves as secretary.

== Social and economic development ==
=== Community goals ===
In 2008, "guided by the ancestral custom of looking ahead seven generations, the community prepared a vision with four goals: self-sufficiency in energy and food, economic independence – or as Chief Planes has said, 'No more living off the dole' – and a return to traditional ways and values." Chief Planes stated: “We used to live sustainably, and only took what we needed from the land. We need to get back to that."

T'Sou-ke First Nation is working with Victoria-based MarineLabs, to collect real-time data about the ocean and areas such as the Sooke Basin. They are deploying smart buoys with sensors to record data about wind speed, wave size, marine traffic, water temperature and water salinity. This will enable them to better monitor the impacts of factors such as climate change, storms, pollution, and shipping, and to manage use of the area.

=== Health care services ===
T'Sou-ke Nation Health Centre, part of the Sooke Integrated Health Network, operates in cooperation with the Vancouver Island Health Authority and the Inter Tribal Health Authority. Medical professionals visit the community regularly. Special clinics are held regularly for matters such as mammograms and flu shots; and workshops on health and wellness are also held on issues such as nutrition, baby programs, and diabetes.

=== Energy self-sufficiency ===
Chief Gordon Planes states: "First Nations have lived for thousands of years on this continent without fossil fuels. It is appropriate that First Nations lead the way out of dependency and addiction to fossil fuels and to rely on the power of the elements, the sun, the wind and the sea once again." T'Sou-ke Nation has become a leader in green initiatives, including mentoring other communities.

==== Solar power ====
In 2009, the community built "a 400-panel solar photovoltaic system that generates 50 per cent more electricity than the next largest in the province." Power bills at the three administrative offices dropped by 100 per cent. In 2009 and 2010, hot-water solar panels were installed on the roofs of 42 of the 86 buildings on the reserve. The energy savings are such that T'Sou-ke Nation is able to sell its surplus to BC Hydro in the summer, and buy it back in the winter when needed, resulting in zero bills.

In 2013, T'Sou-ke Nation was the third Canadian community to be awarded official Solar City Designation by the Canadian Solar Cities Project.

==== Energy efficiency in homes ====
Energy-saving measures were also taken in the homes of community members, such as extra roof insulation, new appliances to replace obsolete ones, and energy-saving light bulbs.

==== Wind power ====
Plans are underway to "develop, build and operate $750-million in large-scale wind power projects on Vancouver Island."

==== Wave power ====
In 2014, T'Sou-ke started a project that will harness wave power from the ocean to create energy.

=== Food security ===
By 2013, the T'Sou-ke community was developing community greenhouses to grow peppers, tomatoes, and eventually a cash crop of wasabi (Japanese horseradish) for export. The ultimate result hoped for is a "zero-mile diet".

In 2014, 15,000 wasabi seedlings had been planted in three greenhouses, which would be harvested in 15 months' time. Profits from the wasabi farm are planned to help expand an existing organic community garden and a 70-hectare oyster farm pilot project in the Sooke Basin. The main market for wasabi is in its medicinal qualities, which is consistent with First Nations traditions of using plants to heal.

In 2008, the Ladybug Garden and Greenhouse was started to harvest fresh produce and herbs for the community, as well as a means to preserve native plants and knowledge about how to find them.

== Further citations ==
- "T'Sou-ke Nation", FPHLCC, First Peoples' Heritage Language & Culture Council, 2013
- "SENĆOŦEN", FPHLCC, 2013
- "SENĆOŦEN - First Peoples' Language Map British Columbia", FPHLCC, 2013
- Montler, Timothy (2018). SENĆOŦEN: A Dictionary of the Saanich Language (PDF) (Electronic ed.). University of Washington Press.
