= Esquimalt =

Township in British Columbia, Canada

- District municipality
- Corporation of the Township of Esquimalt
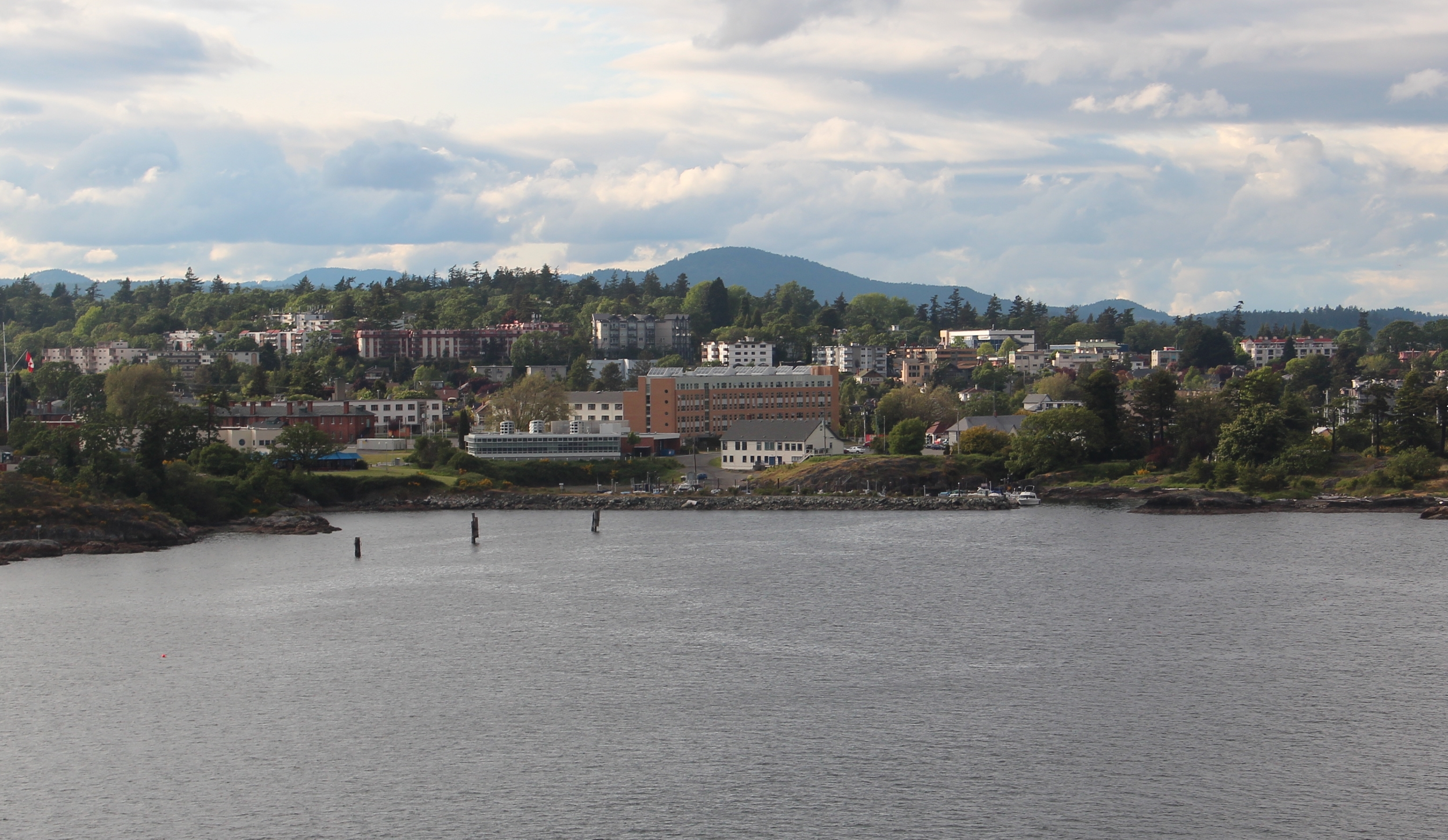
- Interactive map of Esquimalt
- Location of Esquimalt within British Columbia Esquimalt (British Columbia)
- Coordinates: 48°25′56″N 123°24′21″W
- Country: Canada
- Province: British Columbia
- Regional district: Capital
- Incorporated: 1912

Government
  - Type: Municipal council
  - Mayor: Duncan Cavens
  - City Council: Esquimalt Municipal Council
  - MP: Stephanie McLean (LPC)
  - MLA: Darlene Rotchford (NDP)

Area
  - Land: 7.08 km^{2} (2.73 sq mi)
- Elevation: 10 m (33 ft)

Population (2021)
  - Total: 17,533
  - Density: 2,476.7/km^{2} (6,415/sq mi)
- Time zone: UTC−07:00 (PT)
- Highways: 1A
- Waterways: Strait of Juan de Fuca
- Website: www.esquimalt.ca

The Township of Esquimalt (/ɪˈskwaɪmɔːlt/) is a municipality at the southern tip of Vancouver Island, in British Columbia, Canada. It is bordered to the east by the provincial capital, Victoria, to the south by the Strait of Juan de Fuca, to the west by Esquimalt Harbour and Royal Roads, to the northwest by the New Songhees 1A Indian reserve and the town of View Royal, and to the north by a narrow inlet of water called the Gorge, across which is the district municipality of Saanich. It is almost tangential to Esquimalt 1 Indian Reserve near Admirals Road. It is one of the 13 municipalities of Greater Victoria and part of the Capital Regional District.

Esquimalt had a population of 17,533 in 2021. It covers 7.08 km^{2} (2.73 sq mi). It is home to the Pacific fleet of the Royal Canadian Navy.

== History ==
The region now known as Esquimalt was settled by First Nations people approximately 4000 years before the arrival of Europeans. The treaties of the Hudson's Bay Company (HBC), signed in 1843, refer to these people as the Kosampsom group, though they are now known as the Esquimalt Nation. The origin of the word Esquimalt is uncertain, but it may be a transliteration of "Les qui maux", French for "Those who suffer"; which may reflect the then-Western view of perceiving natives in Turtle Island as "savages" who are incompatible with modern life, whose lifestyle needs to be "fixed" instead of respected. The Songhees people (then called Songish), who now have a reserve in Esquimalt, were originally located on the western shore of what is now Victoria Harbour, but were relocated in 1911. Both nations speak a North Straits Salish dialect called Lekwungen (which is also an alternate name for the Songhees).

The first Europeans to reach Esquimalt were the Spanish expedition of Manuel Quimper in Princesa Real in 1790, with Gonzalo López de Haro and Juan Carrasco as pilotos (equivalent to master). Quimper entered and carefully mapped Esquimalt Harbour, which his first mate named Puerto de Córdova after the 46th viceroy of New Spain. Quimper claimed the region for Spain and placed a wooden cross on a hill. When the Spanish returned later that summer the cross had vanished. In 1792 Captain George Vancouver extensively explored the region. Following resolution of the Nootka Crisis, control of the region went to the British and the British-owned HBC.

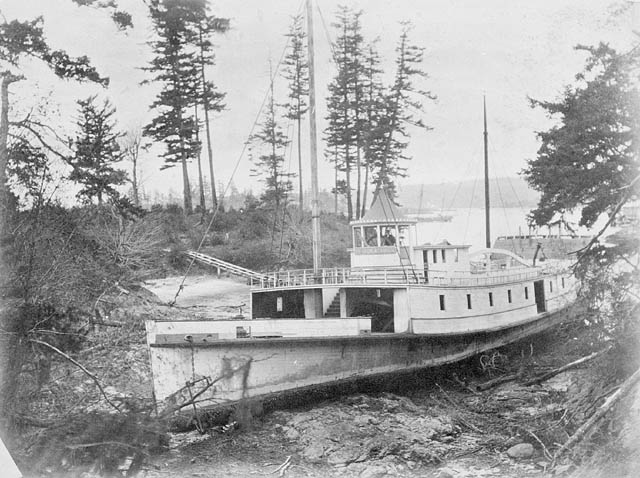
At Esquimalt, B.C., the sternwheel steamboat Lady Alexandra photographed sometime after 1874

In 1843, near the height of the Oregon Question, the HBC was looking for a new location for its Pacific base of operations. John McLoughlin, the company's chief factor at Fort Vancouver, ordered James Douglas to build a new fort on Vancouver Island. Douglas liked Esquimalt Harbour, but rejected it as a site for a fort because there were too many trees there. Douglas chose a spot on the eastern shore of Victoria Harbour at the mouth of the Gorge Inlet. He called it Fort Camosun, but later renamed it Fort Victoria in honour of the British Queen.

However, ships continued to use Esquimalt Harbour to load and offload passengers and supplies. In 1850, the HBC built a fur warehouse and supply point there. In 1852, sailors from a British naval ship, HMS Thetis, built a trail through the forest linking the harbour with Victoria Harbour and the fort. This trail, since paved over, is now one of Esquimalt's main streets, Old Esquimalt Road.

Meanwhile, the HBC decided to try its hand at farming. Douglas leased all of Vancouver Island for seven shillings a year from Great Britain, and had a division of the HBC, the Puget Sound Agricultural Company, come in to develop the land. The Viewfield farm was the first in 1850, with the Constance Cove farm and Craigflower farms added later. The Craigflower farmhouse still exists as a heritage site, as does the Craigflower schoolhouse built to serve the settlers' children. Thomas Mackenzie, the bailiff in charge of the farm, named it for the ancestral home of one of his superiors. By the mid-1860s, the farms were considered failures and abandoned, and the property sold off in small parcels.

In 1855, the British Royal Navy constructed three hospital buildings on the harbour to treat casualties of the Crimean War. A small settlement grew up on the water's edge near the naval installation. In 1858, the discovery of gold on the Fraser River triggered a massive influx of people, who came to Fort Victoria to buy permits and supplies before setting out for the mainland. Many of these ships landed in Esquimalt Harbour. Some of these people stayed in the area, including a few who opened up pubs, as well as some less-than-successful gold miners. With the growing population came the area's first building boom.

Even after the Oregon Treaty of 1846, the boundary between the British Gulf Islands and the U.S. islands in the Strait of Juan de Fuca and Puget Sound was not fully defined. An incident involving an American settler shooting an HBC farm pig on San Juan Island led to the Pig War with the United States in 1859.

In 1865, the Royal Navy relocated the headquarters of its Pacific fleet from Valparaíso, Chile, to Esquimalt Harbour. In 1868, the HBC built a wharf and improved its buildings at its Esquimalt post, and opened a store the following year.

In 1881, the harbour was taken over by the Esquimalt Naval Station, so the HBC post was closed two years later. In 1887, the Esquimalt and Nanaimo Railway was built through the centre of town. That same year, a military base was located at Work Point.

In 1905, the Royal Navy abandoned the Esquimalt Royal Navy Dockyard, but the Pacific base of the new Royal Canadian Navy replaced it in 1910. Gradually, naval life and shipbuilding came to dominate the region's sense of identity. On September 1, 1912, Esquimalt was incorporated as a District Municipality. After World War I, it became one of Canada's major shipbuilding capitals. In June 2010, the Royal Canadian Navy celebrated its 100th anniversary with a fleet review in the waters off Greater Victoria, by Canada's Governor General Michaëlle Jean. The review was attended by warships from Canada, France, New Zealand, Australia, Japan, the United States, and US and Canadian Coast Guard vessels.

== Geography ==
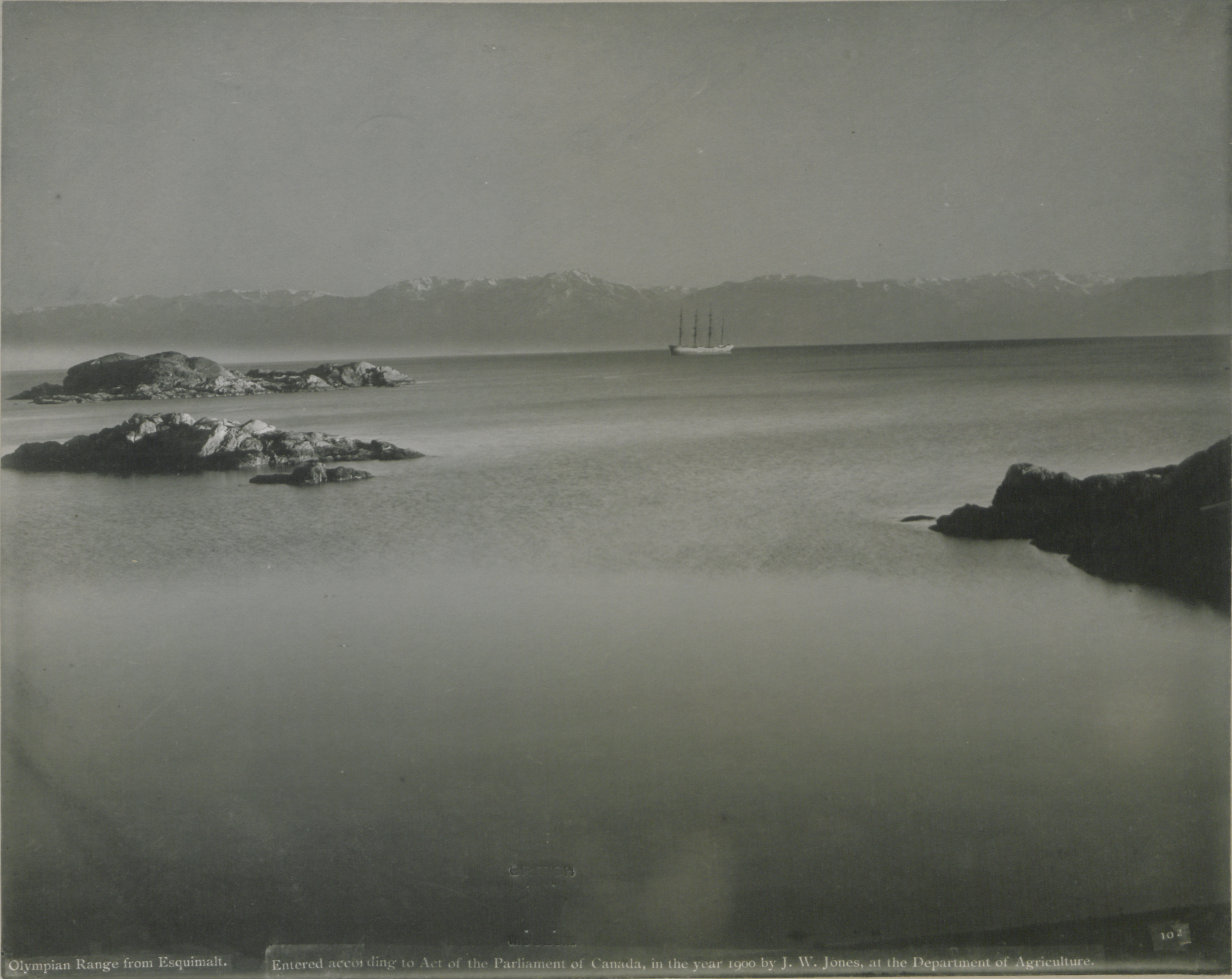
The Olympic Mountains, from Esquimalt, 1900.

Neighbourhoods of Esquimalt:

- Craigflower
- Colville Road
- Gorge Vale Golf
- Esquimalt Village
- Parklands
- Panhandle Alley
- Rock Heights
- Saxe Point
- West Bay
- Work Point (DND)

Although the neighbourhood of Victoria (Vic) West is located on the Esquimalt Peninsula, it is part of the city of Victoria.

== Demographics ==
In the 2021 Census of Population conducted by Statistics Canada, Esquimalt had a population of 17,533 living in 8,565 of its 8,995 total private dwellings, a change of −0.7% from its 2016 population of 17,655. With a land area of 7.08 km^{2} (2.73 sq mi), it had a population density of 2,476.4/km^{2} (6,413.9/sq mi) in 2021.

Historical census populations – Esquimalt

| Year | Pop. | ±% |
|---|---|---|
| 1941 | 3,737 | — |
| 1951 | 10,153 | +171.7% |
| 1956 | 10,384 | +2.3% |
| 1961 | 12,048 | +16.0% |
| 1966 | 12,891 | +7.0% |
| 1971 | 12,922 | +0.2% |

| Year | Pop. | ±% |
|---|---|---|
| 1976 | 15,053 | +16.5% |
| 1981 | 15,870 | +5.4% |
| 1986 | 15,972 | +0.6% |
| 1991 | 16,192 | +1.4% |
| 1996 | 16,151 | −0.3% |
| 2001 | 16,127 | −0.1% |

| Year | Pop. | ±% |
|---|---|---|
| 2006 | 16,209 | +0.5% |
| 2011 | 16,840 | +3.9% |
| 2016 | 17,655 | +4.8% |
| 2021 | 17,533 | −0.7% |

Population counts are not adjusted for boundary changes.
Source: Statistics Canada

=== Ethnicity ===
Panethnic groups in the District of Esquimalt (1996−2021)
| Panethnic group | 2021 | | 2016 | | 2011 | | 2006 | | 2001 | | 1996 | |
| Panethnic group | Pop. | % | Pop. | % | Pop. | % | Pop. | % | Pop. | % | Pop. | % |
|---|---|---|---|---|---|---|---|---|---|---|---|---|
| European (Note: Statistic includes all persons that did not make up part of a visible minority or an indigenous identity.) | 13,955 | 80.71% | 14,010 | 82.78% | 13,760 | 86.35% | 14,705 | 88.03% | 14,390 | 89.99% | 14,540 | 90.88% |
| Indigenous | 970 | 5.61% | 1,190 | 7.03% | 1,080 | 6.78% | 930 | 5.57% | 730 | 4.57% | 730 | 4.56% |
| Southeast Asian (Note: Statistic includes total responses of "Filipino" and "Southeast Asian" under visible minority section on census.) | 635 | 3.67% | 485 | 2.87% | 350 | 2.2% | 230 | 1.38% | 240 | 1.5% | 190 | 1.19% |
| East Asian (Note: Statistic includes total responses of "Chinese", "Korean", and "Japanese" under visible minority section on census.) | 505 | 2.92% | 490 | 2.9% | 250 | 1.57% | 375 | 2.24% | 325 | 2.03% | 210 | 1.31% |
| African | 405 | 2.34% | 275 | 1.62% | 140 | 0.88% | 120 | 0.72% | 140 | 0.88% | 90 | 0.56% |
| South Asian | 305 | 1.76% | 195 | 1.15% | 155 | 0.97% | 160 | 0.96% | 55 | 0.34% | 120 | 0.75% |
| Latin American | 215 | 1.24% | 110 | 0.65% | 105 | 0.66% | 155 | 0.93% | 90 | 0.56% | 45 | 0.28% |
| Middle Eastern (Note: Statistic includes total responses of "West Asian" and "Arab" under visible minority section on census.) | 105 | 0.61% | 80 | 0.47% | 0 | 0% | 20 | 0.12% | 15 | 0.09% | 10 | 0.06% |
| Other/multiracial (Note: Statistic includes total responses of "Visible minority, n.i.e." and "Multiple visible minorities" under visible minority section on census.) | 190 | 1.1% | 95 | 0.56% | 65 | 0.41% | 30 | 0.18% | 10 | 0.06% | 55 | 0.34% |
| Total responses | 17,290 | 98.61% | 16,925 | 95.87% | 15,935 | 98.31% | 16,705 | 99.2% | 15,990 | 99.15% | 16,000 | 99.07% |
| Total population | 17,533 | 100% | 17,655 | 100% | 16,209 | 100% | 16,840 | 100% | 16,127 | 100% | 16,151 | 100% |
Note: Totals greater than 100% due to multiple origin responses.

=== Religion ===
According to the 2021 census, religious groups in Esquimalt included:

- Irreligion (10,705 persons or 61.9%)
- Christianity (5,540 persons or 32.0%)
- Buddhism (265 persons or 1.5%)
- Islam (150 persons or 0.9%)
- Judaism (120 persons or 0.7%)
- Hinduism (60 persons or 0.3%)
- Sikhism (50 persons or 0.3%)
- Indigenous Spirituality (35 persons or 0.2%)

== Communications ==
In the past, Esquimalt has been served by various incarnations of newspapers. Esquimalt ceased having its own newspaper in 2007 when the Esquimalt News by the Black Press folded and merged with the neighbouring Victoria News.

Esquimalt, however, regained its own local community news source in October 2009 with the creation of the online journal Esquimalt Review.

Since 2023, Bell Media's Victoria-based broadcasting stations, CFAX, CHBE-FM and CIVI-TV, have their main offices in Esquimalt, after having been based adjacent to Victoria City Hall for 24 years in the case of CIVI-DT.

== Canadian Forces Base Esquimalt ==
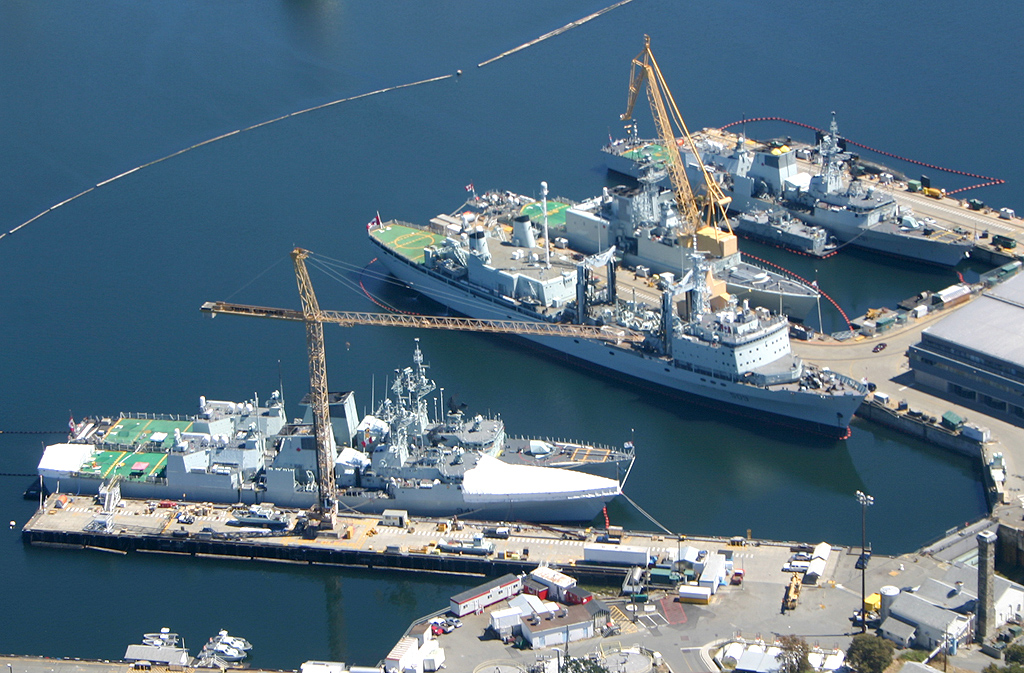
CFB Esquimalt

Canadian Forces Base Esquimalt (CFB Esquimalt) is home to Maritime Forces Pacific (MARPAC) of the Royal Canadian Navy. The base facility dates back to the fur trade era, before the founding of the Colony of Vancouver Island in 1849. It was first established as a military installation by the Royal Navy in 1855, and has been operated by the Royal Canadian Navy since 1910.

== Education ==
Residents are zoned to schools in the Greater Victoria School District.

== See also ==
- List of francophone communities in British Columbia
