= Pauquachin First Nation =

First Nation in British Columbia, Canada

- Band No. 652
- People: Pauquachin
- Treaty: Douglas Treaties
- Province: British Columbia

Land
- Main reserve: Coles Bay #3
- Reserves: Goldstream 13; Hatch Point 12
- Land area: 3.304 km^{2} (1.276 sq mi)

Population (2024)
- On reserve: 226
- On other land: 37
- Off reserve: 157
- Total population: 420

Government
- Chief: Rebecca David

Website
- www.pauquachin.ca www.pauquachinmarine.com

Pauquachin First Nation (formerly Pak-quw-chin) are a Coast Salish indigenous people whose territory is in the Greater Victoria area of southern Vancouver Island, British Columbia, Canada. Their houses stand between Gordon Head and Cowichan Head. They are one of the five groups of houses or 'families' of Saanich, along with the Tsawout, the Tseycum, the Malahat, the T'sou-ke, and the Tsartlip First Nations. According to a 2016 census, 420 people were recognized as Pauquachin.

Speakers of North Straits Salish, they were organized to meet the requirements of the Indian Act into Pauquachin First Nation. The Pauquachin are members of the Te'Mexw Treaty Association, which conducts treaty negotiations with the governments of Canada and British Columbia for several tribes.

== History ==
Main article: History of the Coast Salish peoples

According to the Pauquachin First Nations, the population in Pauquachin began as a small group of 14 families.

=== Contract with the Hudson's Bay Company ===
In 1852, Governor James Douglas made two treaties with the Saanich people. He concluded one with the southern Saanich, i.e. with Pauquachin and Malahat, on February 6, 1852 - signed by Whut-say mullet and nine other people - and one on February 11 with the northern Saanich. In exchange for several hundred blankets, this treaty was the basis for taking their land from them.

=== Reservations ===
The Pauquachin hold title to and live on three reservations on the Saanich Inlet south of Mill Bay and in the Goldstream and Highlands Districts at the southern end of the Finlayson Arm and at the mouth of the Goldstream River– Coles Bay (Indian Reserve #3), Hatch Point (Indian Reserve #12), and Goldstream (Indian Reserve #13), with the Goldstream reserve claim being shared along with the Malahat, Tsartlip, Tsawout and Tseycum First Nations for traditional fishing purposes. All on-reserve Pauquachin members reside on the Coles Bay reserve where residential, cultural, and administrative buildings are available.

The reservations were established in 1877 as part of the Douglas Treaties on Southern Vancouver Island, which were a colonial policy that recognized indigenous possession of land.

=== Destruction of land ===
In 1996, officials determined that the decades-long conversion of the region around the Saanich Inlet had led to massive destruction. A 1997 study of cultural development found similar results. These investigations were related to the Bamberton Town Development Project, a development project adjacent to the Malahat area, a project with far-reaching ecological and hence cultural implications.

A project was developed under the auspices of the Environmental Assessment Office, which was to take into account the demands of the six tribes concerned, i.e. the Malahat, Tsartlip, Pauquachin, Tseycum and Tsawout Bands, and the Cowichan Tribes. The report outlined the traditional and current uses of the affected land around Saanich Inlet.

== Native rights ==
They are a member of the Sencot'en Alliance fighting for Native rights. In the 1850s they were signatories to the Douglas Treaties.

== Chief and councillors ==
Position	Name	Term start	Term end	Reference
Chief	Rebecca Harris	10/25/2014	10/24/2016	

== Treaty process ==
Not participating in BC Treaty Process.

== Demographics ==
Pauquachin First Nation has 420 members.

== Marine stewardship and restoration ==
Pauquachin First Nation expanded its marine stewardship work in the early 2020s by establishing a marine program that coordinates water-quality monitoring, shoreline assessments, and intertidal restoration throughout its traditional territory. The program identified Coles Bay as a priority site because federal authorities closed the area to bivalve harvesting in 1997 due to contamination associated with failing septic systems, stormwater discharge, and upland runoff.

PFN produced a series of reports between 2022 and 2024 detailing the ecological, regulatory, and jurisdictional factors affecting the closure. The municipal-level report documented aging private septic systems, inadequate inspection regimes, and stormwater inputs entering Coles Bay through roadside ditches and culverts. A companion provincial-level report assessed the classification of Coles Bay under sanitary-closure frameworks and identified data gaps in long-term bacterial monitoring. A federal-level report, prepared for agencies including Fisheries and Oceans Canada, outlined steps required to advance a conditional-reopening process, including intensified water-quality sampling, shoreline surveys, and coordinated regulatory enforcement.

In August 2025, Pauquachin First Nation hosted a multi-day restoration gathering to construct a traditional sea garden in Coles Bay. Participants built an intertidal rock wall designed to enhance clam habitat and support long-term restoration objectives. Local and regional reporting highlighted PFN’s emphasis on addressing septic and stormwater contamination as a prerequisite to restoring safe harvesting conditions. The Nation’s marine program received regional environmental recognition for its contributions to coastal stewardship and community-led habitat restoration.
