= Saanich =

Saanich is an anglicization of the name of the Saanich people or W̱SÁNEĆ. It may refer to:

- the Saanich people, a group of indigenous peoples in British Columbia, Canada
- the Saanich dialect, a subdialect of North Straits Salish

== Places ==
- the Saanich Peninsula, a region immediately north of Victoria, British Columbia, and the namesake of the three suburbs of that city located there:
  - Saanich, British Columbia, a district municipality on Vancouver Island in British Columbia, within the Greater Victoria area
  - Central Saanich, British Columbia
  - North Saanich, British Columbia

=== Electoral districts ===
==== Federal ====
- Saanich—Gulf Islands, a federal electoral district 1988–
- Esquimalt—Saanich, a defunct federal electoral district 1953–1988
- Esquimalt—Saanich—Sooke, a federal electoral district 2014-, formerly named "Saanich—Esquimalt—Juan de Fuca"

==== Provincial ====
- Saanich South, a provincial electoral district 1990–
- Saanich North and the Islands, a provincial electoral district 1990–
- Saanich (electoral district), a provincial electoral district 1903–1963
- Saanich and the Islands, a defunct provincial electoral district 1966–1986

== See also ==
- Saanichton, a village in Central Saanich, BC
