= Lekwungen dialect =

Variety of Northern Straits Salish

Lekwungen
- Songhees, Songish
- lək̕ʷəŋ̕ín̕əŋ̕
- Native to: Canada
- Region: British Columbia
- Ethnicity: Lekwungen
- Extinct: October 16, 2025, with the death of Čeyɬəm (Elmer George)
- Revival
- Language family: Salishan: Coast Salish; Central; Straits Salish; North Straits Salish; Lekwungen
- Writing system: lək̓ʷəŋiʔnəŋ Phonetic Alphabet (LPA)

Language codes
- ISO 639-3: (covered in str Straits Salish)
- Glottolog: song1308
- Map of North Straits Salish dialects, with Lekwungen in blue

Lekwungen (Lekwungen: lək̕ʷəŋ̕ín̕əŋ̕ or lək̓ʷəŋiʔnəŋ; also called Songhees or Songish) is a variety (Note: Lekwungen, as are other varieties of Northern Straits Salish, is often variously described as a dialect and a language) of North Straits Salish, a Salishan language spoken by the Lekwungen on Vancouver Island in British Columbia in Canada and on San Juan Island in the State of Washington in the United States. The last native speaker died in 2025, but there are ongoing movements to revitalize it.

== Classification ==
Lekwungen is a variety of Northern Straits Salish, a Coast Salish language originally spoken from southern Vancouver Island, the San Juan Islands, and the area around Bellingham and Semiahmoo Bays. Northern Straits Salish is within the Straits Salish subgroup of languages in the Coast Salish family, which other than itself, also includes the Klallam language of the Olympic peninsula.

All dialects of Northern Straits are mutually intelligible, to the degree where native speakers cannot tell the difference without listening closely. According to linguist Timothy Montler, Lekwungen is most similar to the Saanich dialect. Montler compared it to the relationship between American and Canadian English. However, Saanich and Lekwungen use radically different writing systems. Saanich uses an alphabet developed by Tsartlip elder Dave Elliott in the 1970–1980s, while Lekwungen uses a version of the North American Phonetic Alphabet called the lək̓ʷəŋiʔnəŋ Phonetic Alphabet (LPA).

== History ==
Lekwungen was historically spoken across much of the Greater Victoria area, from around William Head to Victoria, including Oak Bay and Discovery Island. Lekwungen is the variety spoken by the Songhees and Esquimalt peoples.

Many recordings of Lekwungen were made in the 1960s by University of Victoria student Marjorie Mitchell.

Lekwungen was considered to be an extinct language in the 1980s, however there still remained a native speaker in Washington, living on the Lower Elwha Reservation. In 1993, the last fluent speaker died, although there still remained at least one elder who spoke it partially, but as a first language.

The Songhees Nation is working to revitalize the language. Their program, həlitxʷ tθə lək̓ʷəŋiʔnəŋ (Bringing Lekwungen Back to Life), was founded in 2018. They host classes several days a week in which learners learn to pronounce traditional names, vocabulary and grammar, greetings, and cultural information. The program is partly funded by the BC Language Initiative.

Lekwungen was taught in pre-school for the first time in 2018. A survey in 2019 found that children were the most likely family members to speak Lekwungen at home.

In 2024, there was one elder who spoke Lekwungen as a first language and still knew some of the language. A "hybrid" Lekwungen dictionary was published by Timothy Montler that year which included 9,750 entries. 2,161 entries were documented by Lekwungen speakers while the other items were supplemented by Saanich. The dictionary is based on all of the available Lekwungen recordings as well as 34 recorded but unpublished Lekwungen narratives.

== Phonology ==
Consonants
		Bilabial	Alveolar			Palatal	Velar		Uvular		Glottal
		Bilabial	median	sibilant	lateral	Palatal	plain	lab.	plain	lab.	Glottal
Plosive/ Affricate	plain	p	t			t͡ʃ	(k)	kʷ	q	qʷ	ʔ
Plosive/ Affricate	ejective	pʼ	tʼ	t͡sʼ	t͡ɬʼ	t͡ʃʼ		kʷʼ	qʼ	qʷʼ	ʔ
Fricative				s	ɬ	ʃ		xʷ	χ	χʷ	h
Sonorant	plain	m	n		l	j		w	ɴ		
Sonorant	glottalized	ˀm	ˀn		ˀl	ˀj		ˀw	ˀɴ		

- /k/ is only found in loanwords.

Vowels
	Front	Central	Back
Close	i		u
Mid	e	ə	
Open		a	

== Orthography ==
Lekwungen is written with the lək̓ʷəŋiʔnəŋ Phonetic Alphabet (LPA). The LPA is a variation of the North American Phonetic Alphabet.

Lekwungen Phonetic Alphabet
Letter	IPA	English approximation (Note: See "The Alphabet" in Montler 2024 for more detail)	Notes
ʔ	/ʔ/	Like the - in "uh-oh"	
a	/ɑ/	Like the a in father	
c̓	/t͡sʼ/	Like the ts in hats but "ejected"	
č	/t͡ʃ/	Like the ch in church	
č̓	/t͡ʃʼ/	Similar to above but "ejected"	
e	/e/	Like the e in bet	
ə	/ə/	Like the u in cut, or the a and o in above	
h	/h/	Like the h in hat	
i	/i/	Like the i in machine	
k	/k/	Like the k in kick	Only occurs in words borrowed from Chinook Jargon
kʷ	/kʷ/	Like the qu in quick	
k̓ʷ	/kʷʼ/	Similar to above but "ejected"	
l	/l/	Like the l in loop	
l̕	/l̰/	Similar to above but with creaky voice	
ɬ	/ɬ/	No English approximant	
ƛ̕	/t͜ɬʼ/	No English approximant	
m	/m/	Like the m in mom	
m̓	/m̰/	Similar to above but with creaky voice	
n	/n/	Like the n in none	
n̓	/n̰/	Similar to above but with creaky voice	
ŋ	/ŋ/	Like the ng in sung	
ŋ̓		Similar to above but with creaky voice	
p	/p/	Like the p in pop	
p̓	/pʼ/	Similar to above but "ejected"	
q	/q/	Like the c in call but further back in the mouth	
q̓	/qʼ/	Similar to above but "ejected"	
qʷ	/qʷ/	Similar to q but with rounded lips	
q̓ʷ	/qʷʼ/	Similar to above but "ejected"	
s	/s/	Like the s in sis	
š	/ʃ/	Like the sh in shoe	
t	/t/	Like the t in tot	
t̕	/tʼ/	Similar to above but "ejected"	
u	/u/	Like the oo in hoot	
w	/w/	Like the w in wow	
w̓	/w̰/	Similar to above but with creaky voice	
xʷ	/xʷ/	Like the wh in which (in some dialects)	
x̌	/χ/	No English approximant	
x̌ʷ	/χʷ/	No English approximant	
y	/j/	Like the y in yes or buy	
y̓	/j̰/	Similar to above but with creaky voice	

== Grammar ==
The grammar of Lekwungen is essentially the same as other dialects of Northern Straits. Lekwungen is a split-ergative language.

=== Morphology ===
Lekwungen words can be a root by themselves, however, typically roots are combined with one or more prefixes, suffixes, infixes, or reduplicatives.

Lekwungen has only one preposition, ʔə, which marks oblique noun phrases. Ideas of location and direction are typically indicated with serial verbs.

Lekwungen verbs are always intransitive unless they carry a transitive suffix. There are several different transitivising suffixes which indicate control/noncontrol, causative, and applicative ideas. Transitive verbs can be made intransitive with the passive suffix -əŋ. Lekwungen has two classes of auxiliary verbs: one links to the main verb with the particle ʔuʔ, and the other with the particle ʔiʔ.

=== Syntax ===
Lekwungen typically follows a verb-subject-object (VSO) word order, in which the verb comes first. In transitive sentences, the subject typically comes before the object, although there are some cases where the object can come first.

Subject, tense, question, and imperative markers are all used to describe the speech act.

== See also ==
- North Straits Salish language
- Lekwungen
- Songhees First Nation
- Esquimalt First Nation
