= T'Sou-ke dialect =

Dialect of North Straits Salish

T'Sou-ke
- Sooke
- Native to: Canada
- Region: southern Vancouver Island
- Ethnicity: T'Sou-ke people
- Speakers: ~10 partial speakers (2014)
- Revival: 1 learner (2014)
- Language family: Salishan: Coast Salish; Central Coast Salish; Straits Salish; North Straits Salish; T'Sou-ke

Language codes
- ISO 639-3: –
- Glottolog: sook1244 Sooke

T'Sou-ke, also spelled Sooke /ˈsuːk/ and previously Soke /ˈsoʊk/, is the dialect of the North Straits Salish language spoken by the T'Sou-ke people of Vancouver Island in British Columbia. As of 2014, there were no fluent speakers, although there were at least ten speakers remaining who could somewhat speak and understand the language.

The spelling T'Sou-ke is an exoticization of Sooke, which derives from the name of the area around Sooke Harbor. The latter may be from the Klallam form /súʔukʷ/ (now pronounced [sóʔokʷ]), or a relic of an earlier Northern Straits pronunciation; the Klallam preserves the older form, where *u → /a/ in all of the Northern Straits dialects. The current Saanich form is SO¸EȻ, pronounced /'saʔəkʷ/ and the Lekwungen form is sáʔəkʷ.

== Phonology ==
T'Sou-ke has /j/ in some words where other dialects of North Straits Salish have /l/. Wayne Suttles suggested that the dialect has been influenced by the neighboring S'Klallam language, or that some groups of T'Sou-ke differed in speech to others.
