= Bamberton Provincial Park =

Canadian provincial park

- IUCN category II (national park)
- Location within Vancouver Island Location within British Columbia Location within Cowichan Valley Regional District
- Interactive map of Bamberton Provincial Park
- Location: Vancouver Island, British Columbia, Canada
- Nearest city: Mill Bay
- Coordinates: 48°36′23″N 123°31′41″W
- Area: 28 ha (69 acres)
- Established: 28 March 1960
- Governing body: BC Parks

Bamberton Provincial Park is a provincial park located in Mill Bay, British Columbia, Canada. The park area consists of a beach that borders on Saanich Inlet, and is connected to a camping area by several trails. The traditional name of the beach is qʷələs in the Saanich dialect. It shares its name with the now abandoned company town of Bamberton.

The park was established by Order-in-Council in 1960, with an area of approximately 68.94 hectares (170.4 acres). It was reduced in size in 2004 to 28 hectares (69 acres).
