= Douglas Treaties =

1850–1854 treaties between Indigenous peoples and the Colony of Vancouver Island

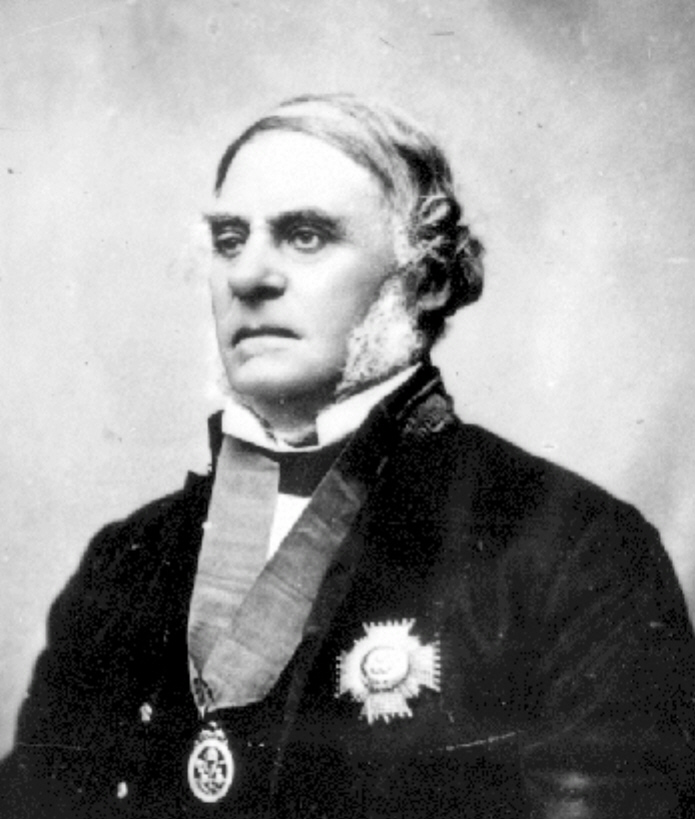
- Sir James Douglas
- Drafted: 1850–1854
- Location: Colony of Vancouver Island
- Parties: Various First Nations; Colony of Vancouver Island
- Language: English

The Douglas Treaties, also known as the Vancouver Island Treaties or the Fort Victoria Treaties, are a series of treaties that were signed between a number of First Nations of Vancouver Island and the Colony of Vancouver Island.

== Background ==
With the signing of the Oregon Treaty in 1846, the Hudson's Bay Company (HBC) determined that its trapping rights in the Oregon Territory were tenuous. Thus in 1849, it moved its western headquarters from Fort Vancouver on the Columbia River (present-day Vancouver, Washington) to Fort Victoria. Fort Vancouver's Chief Factor, James Douglas, was relocated to the young trading post to oversee the company's operations west of the Rockies.

This development prompted the British colonial office to designate the territory a crown colony on January 13, 1849. The new Colony of Vancouver Island was leased to the HBC for a ten-year period, and Douglas was charged with encouraging British settlement. Richard Blanshard was named the colony's governor. Blanshard discovered that the hold of the HBC over the affairs of the new colony was all but absolute, and that it was Douglas who held all practical authority in the territory. There was no civil service, no police, no militia, and virtually every British colonist was an employee of the HBC.

== Treaties ==
As the colony expanded the HBC started buying up lands for colonial settlement and industry from First Nations on Vancouver Island. For four years Governor James Douglas, made a series of fourteen land purchases from First Nations.

To negotiate the terms, Douglas met first in April 1850 with leaders of the Lekwungen people (now Songhees and Esquimalt First Nations), and made verbal agreements. Each leader made an X at the bottom of a blank ledger. The actual terms of the treaty were only incorporated in August, and modelled on the New Zealand Company's deeds of purchase for Maori land, used after the signing of Treaty of Waitangi.

The Douglas Treaties cover approximately 930 square kilometres (360 sq mi) of land around Victoria, Saanich, Sooke, Nanaimo and Port Hardy, all on Vancouver Island, that were exchanged for cash, clothing and blankets. The terms of the treaties promised that they would be able to retain existing village lands and fields for their use, and also would be allowed to hunt and fish on the surrendered lands.

These fourteen land purchases became the Douglas Treaties. Douglas didn't continue buying land due to lack of money and the slow growth of the Vancouver Island colony. Along with Treaty 8, the Douglas Treaties were the last treaties signed between the Crown and the First Nations in British Columbia until Nisga'a Final Agreement.

The treaties are controversial for a number of reasons and have been subject to numerous court cases. One of the major sources of dispute regarding the treaties is the actual terms of the treaties were left blank at the time of signing and a number of clauses and pages were instead inserted at a later date.

== Context ==
The treaties were signed during a period of severe cultural destruction in which the Songhees had experienced precipitous population decline, due to the arrival of foreign diseases. The treaties remain highly controversial given that it is unclear whether the Indigenous leaders knew exactly what they were signing over.

== Treaty members ==
Treaty Group Name	Modern First Nation (band government)	Date	Land covered by Treaty	Money exchanged for land	Ref
Teechamitsa	Esquimalt First Nation	29 April 1850	Country lying between Esquimalt and Point Albert	£27 10 shillings (UK £3,201 in 2025)	
Kosampson	Esquimalt First Nation	30 April 1850	Esquimalt Peninsula and Colquitz Valley	£52 10 shillings (UK £6,111 in 2025)	
Whyomilth	Esquimalt First Nation	30 April 1850	Northwest of Esquimalt Harbour	£30 (UK £3,492 in 2025)	
Chewhaytsum	Becher Bay Band	1 May 1850	Sooke	£45 ten shillings (UK £5,296 in 2025)	
Chilcowitch	Songhees First Nation	30 April 1850	Point Gonzales	£45 (UK £5,238 in 2025)	
Che-ko-nein	Songhees First Nation	30 April 1850	Point Gonzales to Cedar Hill	£79 10 shillings (UK £9,253 in 2025)	
Sooke	T'sou-ke Nation	10 May 1850	Northwest of Sooke Inlet	£48 6 shillings 8 pence (UK £5,633 in 2025)	
Ka-ky-aakan	Becher Bay Band	1 May 1850	Metchosin	£43 6 shillings 8 pence (UK £5,051 in 2025)	
Saanich Tribe (South)	Tsawout First Nation and Tsartlip First Nation	7 February 1852	South Saanich	£41 13 shillings 4 pence (UK £4,842 in 2025)	
Saanich Tribe (North)	Pauquachin First Nation and Tseycum First Nations	11 February 1852	North Saanich	[amount not stated]	
Saalequun	Snuneymuxw First Nation	23 December 1854	[area not stated]	[amount not stated]	
Swengwhung	Songhees First Nation	30 April 1850	[area not stated]	[amount not stated]	
Queackar	Kwakiutl (Kwawkelth) Band	February 1851	Fort Rupert	£64 (UK £7,449 in 2025)	
Quakiolth	Kwakiutl (Kwawkelth) Band	February 1851	Fort Rupert	£86 (UK £10,010 in 2025)	
