= Saanich people =

Coast Salish people in Canada and the US

Saanich
W̱SÁNEĆ
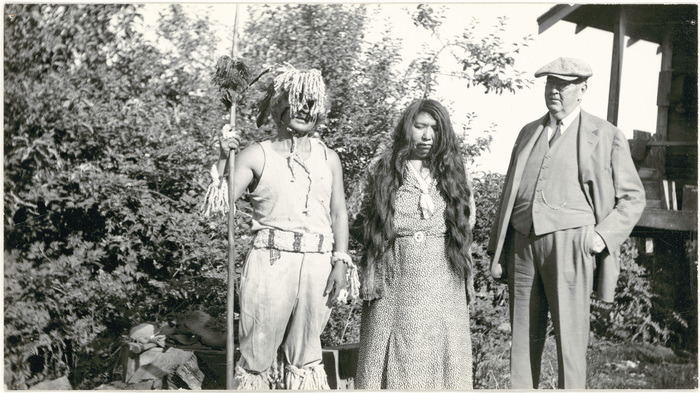
- Elsie Copper and her brother, who is wearing traditional Saanich dance regalia. George Gustav Heye, right (1938)

Regions with significant populations
- British Columbia, Canada

Languages
- Saanich, English

Religion
- Christianity; traditional folk religion

Related ethnic groups
- Lekwungen, Lummi, Samish, Semiahmoo, Sooke, and other Coast Salish peoples

- People: W̱SÁNEĆ
- Language: SENĆOŦEN
- Country: ÁLEṈENEȻ (TŦE W̱SÁNEĆ)

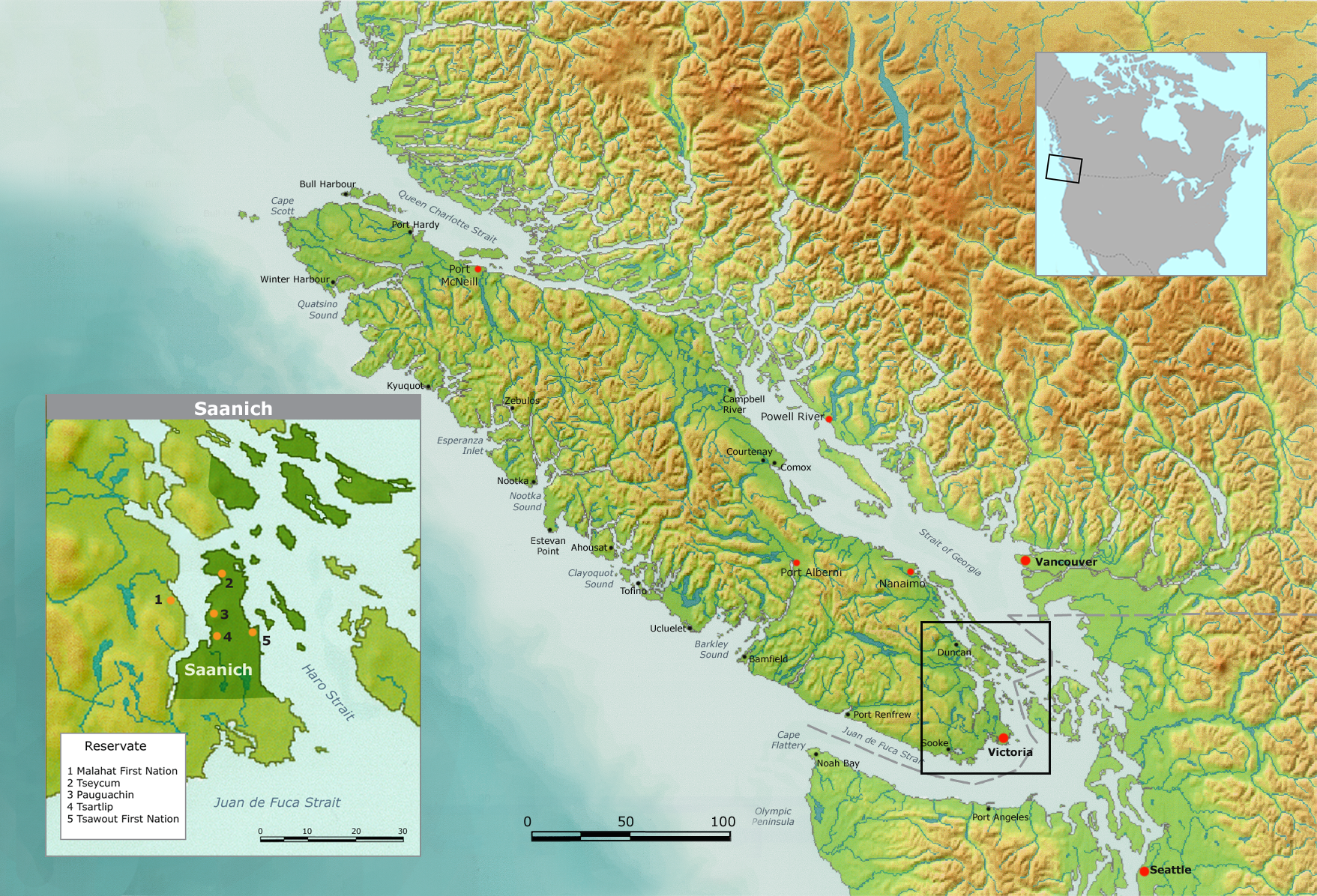
Map of the Saanich Reserves

The Saanich people (Saanich: W̱SÁNEĆ [ˈxʷse.nət͡ʃ]) are a Central Coast Salish people indigenous to parts of British Columbia and western Washington state.

The W̱SÁNEĆ peoples are represented by the Tsartlip, Pauquachin, Tsawout, Tseycum and Malahat First Nations. The W̱SÁNEĆ Leadership Council Society consists of three of these nations: Tsartlip, Tseycum and Tsawout. These W̱SÁNEĆ First Nations remain on their ancestral lands.

== Saanich bands ==
- MÁLEXEȽ – Malahat First Nation
- BOḰEĆEN – Pauquachin
- SȾÁ¸UTW̱ – Tsawout
- W̱JOȽEȽP – Tsartlip
- W̱SÍḴEM – Tseycum First Nation

== Leadership Council ==
On May 7, 2018, the W̱SÁNEĆ Leadership Council was created as a representation of the W̱SÁNEĆ First Nations to the Government. The creation of this council not only brought three Indigenous groups together, but it also established a legal governing body. With this council, came many proposals and projects to benefit the W̱SÁNEĆ First Nations.

Includes:

- January 2018, the submission of a proposal for the Government of Canada to make the council a legal governing body (accepted).
- Submission of funding to the federal government's "National Rebuilding" program.
- Negotiations of a government to government project with the Capital Regional District.

== Language ==
The W̱SÁNEĆ language or Saanich dialect is called SENĆOŦEN. This dialect was revitalized by the late John Elliot, an important member of the W̱SÁNEĆ community and peoples.

== ȽÁU,WELṈEW̱ Tribal school ==
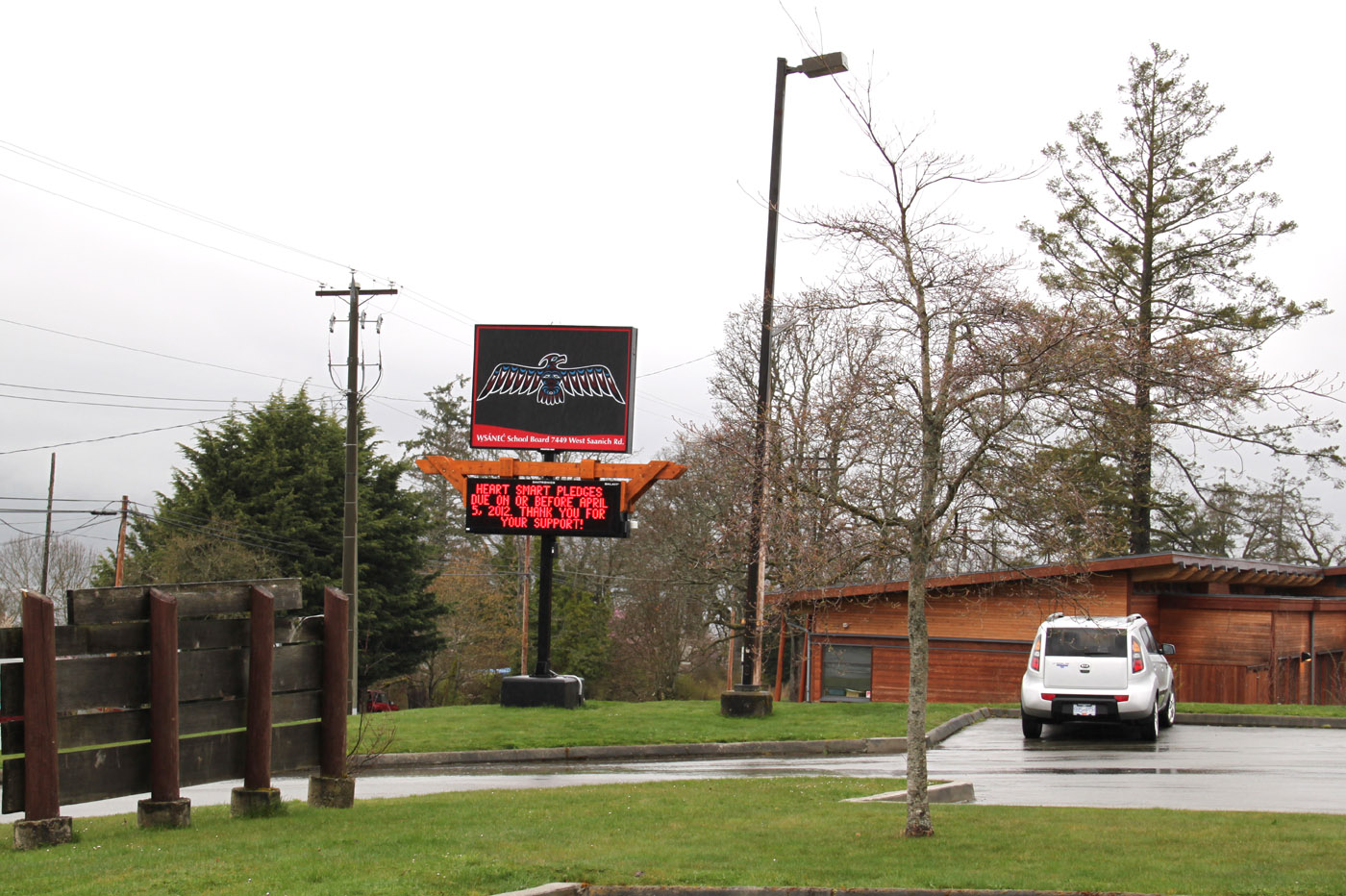
ȽÁU,WEL,ṈEW̱ school

Four of the Saanich First Nations, Tsartlip, Pauquachin, Tseycum and Tsawout, created the ȽÁU,WELṈEW̱ Tribal School in 1989. It holds classes from preschool to grade 10, with classes for adults in the adult centre next door to the high school where SENĆOŦEN, the W̱SÁNEĆ language, and W̱SÁNEĆ culture are taught along with the provincial curriculum. The school is also a venue for community events.

== See also ==
- Coast Salish peoples
