= Songhees First Nation =

First Nation living in Victoria area, British Columbia

Songhees Nation
- Band No. 656
- People: Lekwungen
- Treaty: Douglas Treaties
- Province: British Columbia

Land
- Main reserve: New Songhees 1A
- Reserves: Halkett Island 2; Chatham Islands 4; Discovery Island 3
- Land area: 1.38 km^{2} (0.53 sq mi)

Population (2024)
- On reserve: 350
- On other land: 43
- Off reserve: 294
- Total population: 687

Government
- Chief: Ronald Sam

Website
- www.songheesnation.ca

Songhees First Nation is one of two First Nations governments that represents the Lekwungen people (the other being Esquimalt First Nation). They are located around Victoria, British Columbia on southern Vancouver Island, British Columbia, Canada.

== See also ==
- Coast Salish peoples
- North Straits Salish language
