= Esquimalt First Nation =

First Nation in Victoria, British Columbia

Coordinates: 48.4306°N 123.4147°W

- Band No. 644
- Xʷsepsəm
- People: Lekwungen
- Province: British Columbia

Land
- Main reserve: Esquimalt
- Land area: 0.189 km^{2} (0.073 sq mi)

Population (2025)
- On reserve: 167
- On other land: 29
- Off reserve: 182
- Total population: 378

Government
- Chief: Jerome Thomas
- Council: Alicia Thomas; Anastasia Thomas; Eddie Thomas; Sherry Thomas

Website
- www.esquimaltnation.ca

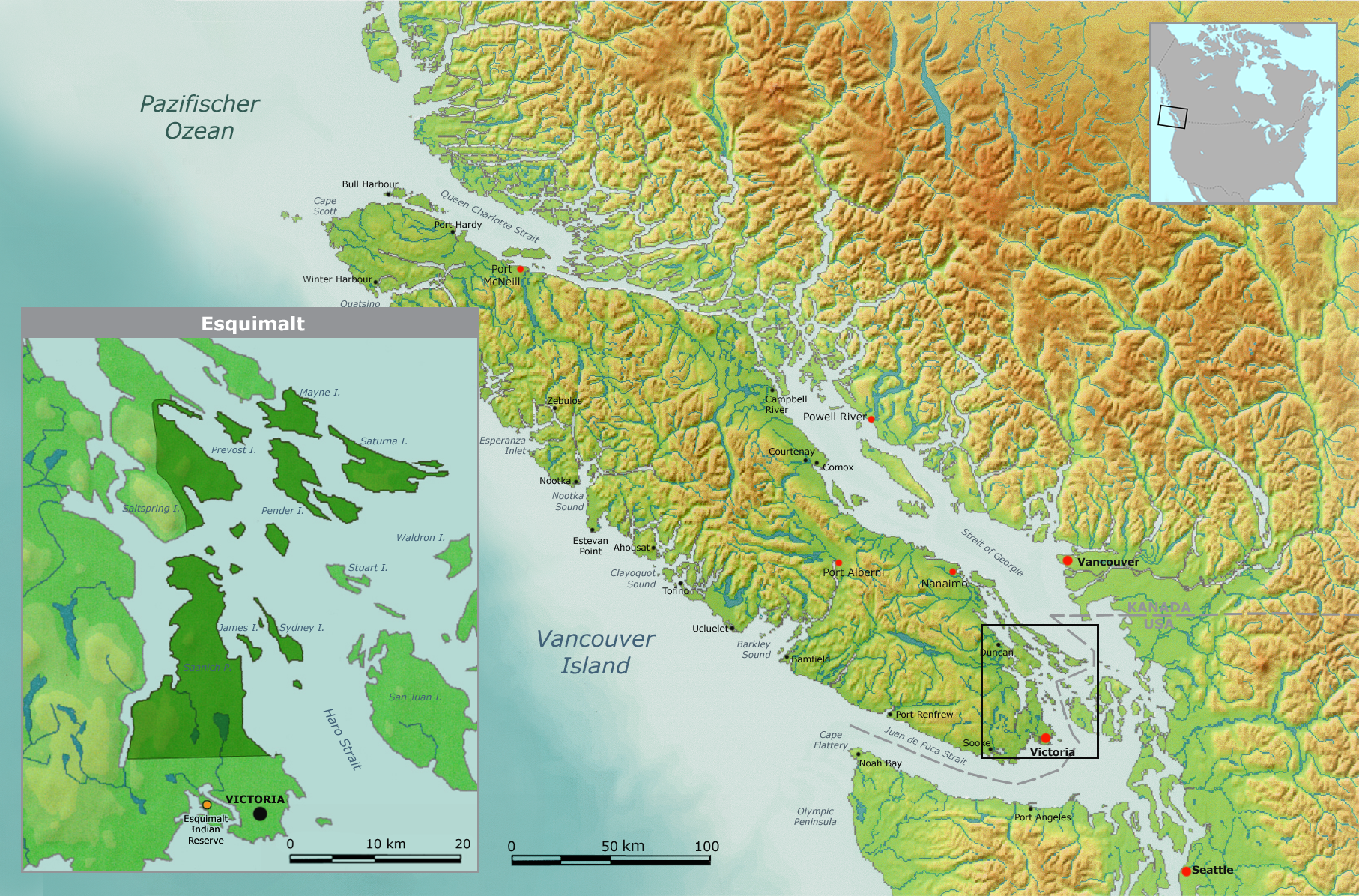
Map of traditional Esquimalt tribal territory.

Esquimalt First Nation (Straits Salish: Xʷsepsəm), is one of two First Nation band governments of the Lekwungen peoples, the other being Songhees First Nation. Historically, their village was located closer to Victoria proper, but today their main reserve is on the north shore of Esquimalt Harbour adjacent to View Royal. They are a member nation of the First Nations of South Island Tribal Council, and were signatories to the Douglas Treaties.
