= FirstVoices =

Web platform for language revitalization projects

- Website type: Open-source language revitalization platform
- Available in: English; Indigenous languages
- Owners: First Peoples' Cultural Council; First Peoples' Cultural Foundation
- Website: https://www.firstvoices.com
- Commercial: No
- Registration: Optional
- Launched: 2003
- Current status: Active
- Written in: Python (Django), JavaScript (React)

FirstVoices is an open-source web platform for language revitalization projects, which supports Indigenous communities to share and promote their languages, oral culture and linguistic history. It is a joint initiative of the First Peoples' Cultural Council (a First Nations-led Crown Corporation in British Columbia, Canada) and the First Peoples' Cultural Foundation (an Indigenous-led crown agency).

== History ==
FirstVoices.com was launched in 2003, and allows language teams from Indigenous communities to create secure, interactive web sites to document and promote their languages by uploading alphabets, audio recordings, words, phrases, songs and stories. The languages sites include kid-friendly views of the content, and games based on the uploaded words and media. As of 2024, FirstVoices hosts 65 public and 17 private sites for British Columbia languages, and also supports Indigenous communities throughout Canada, the US, New Zealand and Australia.

Following the principles of data sovereignty, all content is controlled and managed by community language administrator teams composed of youth, language teachers, language champions, fluent elders, technical staff and others. Most language sites are publicly accessible, but others are password-protected at the direction of their individual language community.

In 2023, FirstVoices migrated to a new version with a rebuilt back-end that uses Django, and an updated front-end interface using ReactJS. Before that, a 2018 version was based on Nuxeo.

== Additional tools ==
In addition to the web platform, FirstVoices provides several other tools and projects related to language revitalization software:

- FirstVoices dictionary apps – 17 free and open-source mobile apps which reflect content in FirstVoices language sites.
- FirstVoices keyboards – desktop keyboard software and mobile keyboard apps for over 100 languages, including every First Nations language in Canada, Australia, and New Zealand, and many Indigenous languages spoken in the United States.
- BC Sans font – a typeface optimized for displaying Unicode text in British Columbia Indigenous languages and orthographies.
- Training and grants through FPCC's Language Technology Program.
- Help desk and knowledge base.

=== Past projects ===
- Chat app – in 2012, before Apple allowed third-party keyboards on iPhones, FirstVoices produced a chat app that supported typing in every Indigenous language in North America and Australia. This has been replaced by keyboard apps.
- Language Tutor and Language Lab – released in 2010, FirstVoices Language Tutor was a tool for creating language lessons, and Language Lab was a portable kit for delivering lessons via "a laptop server, Wi-Fi antenna, power bar, and set of iPads". The lessons allowed users to "listen to a word or phrase, record themselves speaking and then compare the result with a recording of a fluent speaker" as well as other types of quizzes and games. Parents and teachers could monitor student progress.

== History and context ==
Officially launched in 2003, the idea for FirstVoices came about in 1999 from Peter Brand and J,SIṈTEN (Dr. John Elliott), leaders in online SENĆOŦEN language revitalization. In the two decades since FirstVoices started, it has grown to host language sites for nearly 100 languages and language varieties.

Indigenous language revitalization is a time-sensitive concern in British Columbia and globally. Many Indigenous languages face a loss of fluent speakers, many of whom are over 65 years old. Almost three-quarters of British Columbia's Indigenous population live away from reserves and are less likely to have access to language and cultural programming. There is a growing population of language learners in British Columbia, many of whom are children and younger adults.

The target audience for FirstVoices is Indigenous language learners. These make up the majority of the more than 350,000 yearly FirstVoices site visits, though many visitors are non-Indigenous people interested in Indigenous languages. Online tools provide access to language learning for people from many backgrounds.
