= Tsawout First Nation =

First Nations government in Canada

- Band No. 654
- SȾÁUTW̱
- People: Saanich people
- Treaty: Douglas Treaties
- Province: British Columbia

Land
- Main reserve: East Saanich 2
- Reserves: Bare Island 9; Fulford Harbour 5; Goldstream 13; Pender Island 8; Saturna Island 7
- Land area: 4.23 km^{2} (1.63 sq mi)

Population (2024)
- On reserve: 560
- On other land: 122
- Off reserve: 334
- Total population: 1016

Government
- Chief: Abraham Pelkey

Tribal Council
- Sencot'en Alliance

Website
- tsawout.ca

Tsawout First Nation is a First Nations government located on Vancouver Island, British Columbia, Canada. They are a member of the Sencot'en Alliance. In the 1850s they were signatories to the Douglas Treaties. They speak the SENĆOŦEN language.

== Lands ==
East Saanich Indian Reserve No. 2, the Tsawout First Nation main village, is about 15 minutes north of the City of Victoria and lies on the east side of the Saanich Peninsula. East Saanich IR No. 2 is approximately 241 hectares in size.

There are also Tsawout reservations on Salt Spring Island (Fulford Harbour), Saturna Island, Mandarte Island, Pender Island, and Goldstream

== Chief and Councillors ==
Position	Name	Term start	Term end	Reference
Chief	Claxton, Nick	07/04/2019	07/04/2021	
Councillor	Etzel, John	07/04/2015	07/04/2021	
Councillor	Etzel, Samantha	07/04/2019	07/04/2021	
Councillor	Pelkey, Abraham	07/04/2019	07/04/2021	
Councillor	Sam, Mary Ann	07/04/2019	07/04/2021	
Councillor	Sam, Stanley	07/04/2019	07/04/2021	
Councillor	Underwood, Bruce	07/04/2019	07/04/2021	
Councillor	Underwood, Mavis	07/04/2019	07/04/2021	
Councillor	Wilson, John	07/04/2019	07/04/2021	

== Treaty Process ==
Not participating in BC Treaty Process.

== Demographics ==
As of 2016 the Tsawout First Nation has 1,685 members.

== Social, Educational and Cultural Programs and Facilities ==
On July 17, 2009, the Tsawout First Nation's longhouse community centre was burned down in a mysterious fire. Replacement for the burned structure could cost $500,000. The structure replaced the former community centre that burned down in 1978.

== See also ==
- Douglas Treaties
