= Lekwungen =

First Nation in Victoria, British Columbia

lək̓ʷəŋən
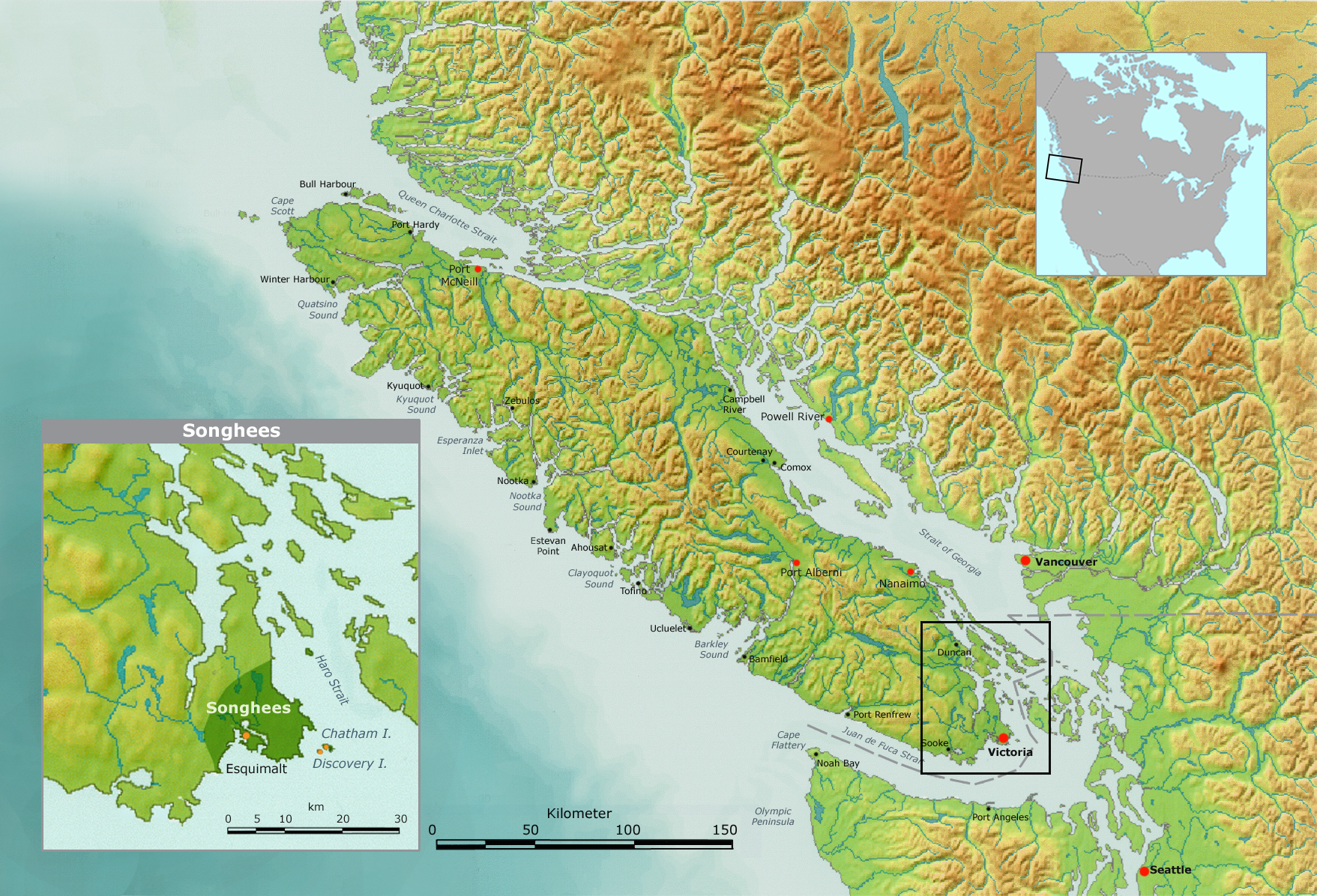
- Map of traditional Lekwungen territory

Languages
- Lekwungen

Related ethnic groups
- Coast Salish

- People: Lək̓ʷəŋən
- Language: Lək̓ʷəŋín̓əŋ
- Country: Lək̓ʷəŋən Tung’exʷ

The Lekwungen (Halkomelem: lək̓ʷəŋən) are a Coast Salish people who reside on southeastern Vancouver Island, British Columbia in the Greater Victoria area. They are represented by the Songhees First Nation and Esquimalt First Nation. Their traditional language is Lekwungen, a dialect of the North Straits Salish language.

== Name ==
The term "Lekwungen" is a contemporary designation used to describe a group of Indigenous peoples who speak the Lekwungen language. It refers specifically to six families historically residing on southern Vancouver Island, in the area now known as Greater Victoria.

The people associated with this term have also been referred to as the Songhees or Songish, although the latter designation is now primarily used to refer to the Songhees Band government. This term was an Anglicization of an ethnonym to describe a group living between Albert Head and Esquimalt Lagoon.

== History ==
=== Pre-colonial history ===
The traditional territory of the Lekwungen encompasses most of what is now the Greater Victoria area, as well as the nearby Discovery, Chatham, and San Juan islands. Their territory was divided between six families: Kayaakan, Teechamitsa, Whyomilth, Kosampsom, Swngwhung, and Chekonein.

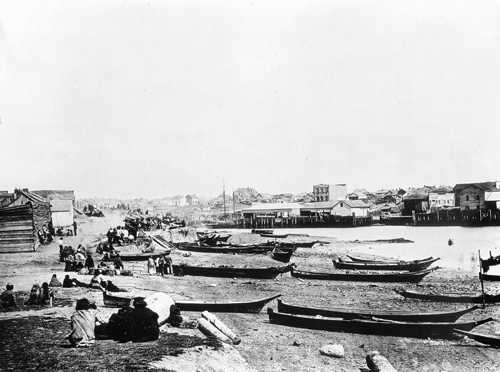
Old Songhees village on Victoria Harbour (c. 1880s)

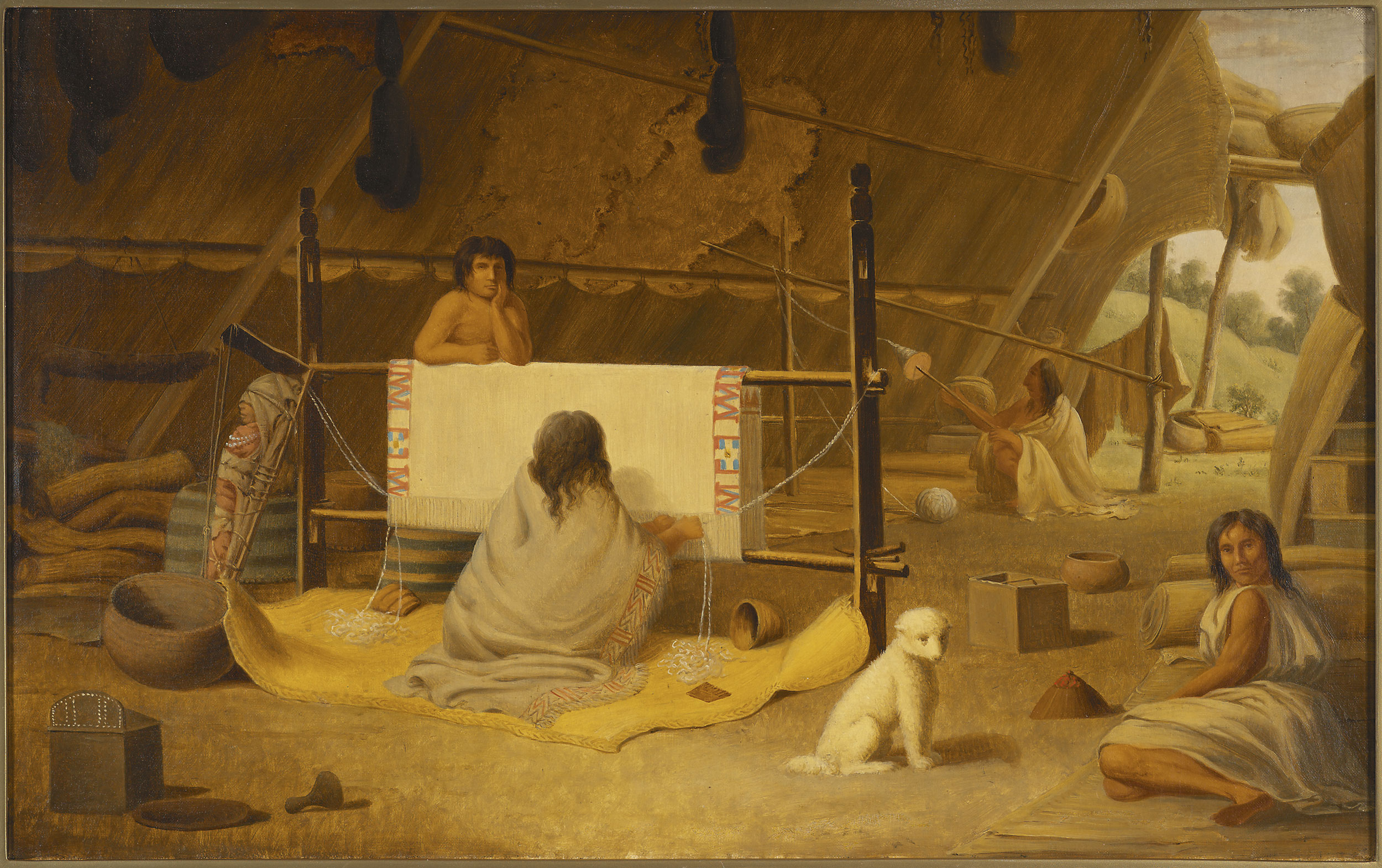
Painting of a Songhees woman weaving a blanket, (1849–1856)

There is evidence of a fortified village existing at Finlayson Point in Beacon Hill Park before the arrival of Europeans. Before European contact much of the government was through a clan system, with twelve clans which each had its own fishing and hunting territory. Chiefship was hereditary in the male line and there were three castes - nobles, commons, and slaves. Like other north-west coast tribes they practiced potlatch and ceremonial gift distribution. The dead were buried in canoes or boxes upon the surface of the ground, or laid away in trees. Mentioning the names of a dead person was taboo. The Coast Salish traditionally lived in bighouses, large rectangular communal houses of cedar planks, adorned with carved and jointed totem posts.

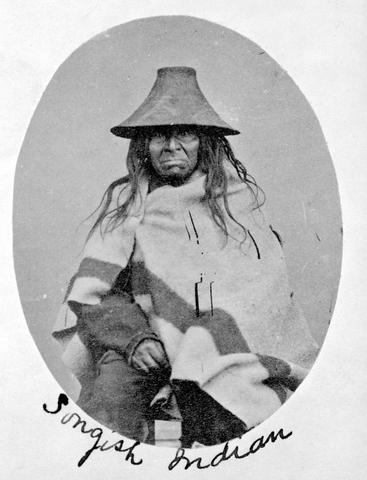
1800s picture of Songhees male in traditional hat

==== Sitchanalth ====
A major Coast Salish seaport community called Sitchanalth was located in the area now known as Willows Beach in Oak Bay, British Columbia. It is estimated that the village's peak population was around 10,000 people.

Sitchanalth was destroyed by a tsunami related to a major earthquake along the Devils Mountain Fault that occurred around 930 A.D. The death toll from the earthquake and resulting tsunami have been described as "catastrophic" with a small group of survivors relocating from Willows Beach to what is now the Inner Harbour area of Victoria, British Columbia.

A cairn at Willows Beach marks the spot where the ancient settlement once stood.

== Colonization ==
The Lekwungen population was estimated to be 8,500 in 1859, but by 1914 the population had decreased to less than 200.

At the time of the establishment of Fort Victoria by the British in 1843, a Lekwungen village was situated adjacent to the fort. The village was subsequently moved across Victoria Harbour and a reserve established adjacent to what is now the municipality of View Royal.

A traditional blessing in Lekwungen appears on a mural on the Ogden Point breakwater.

During the 1862 Pacific Northwest smallpox epidemic, which killed about two-thirds of all native people in British Columbia, the Lekwungen were largely spared due to smallpox vaccines given by Hudson's Bay Company physician Dr. John Helmcken, as well as Lekwungen self-quarantining on Discovery Island. Due to these factors the Lekwungen survived the epidemic with few deaths.

=== Douglas Treaties ===
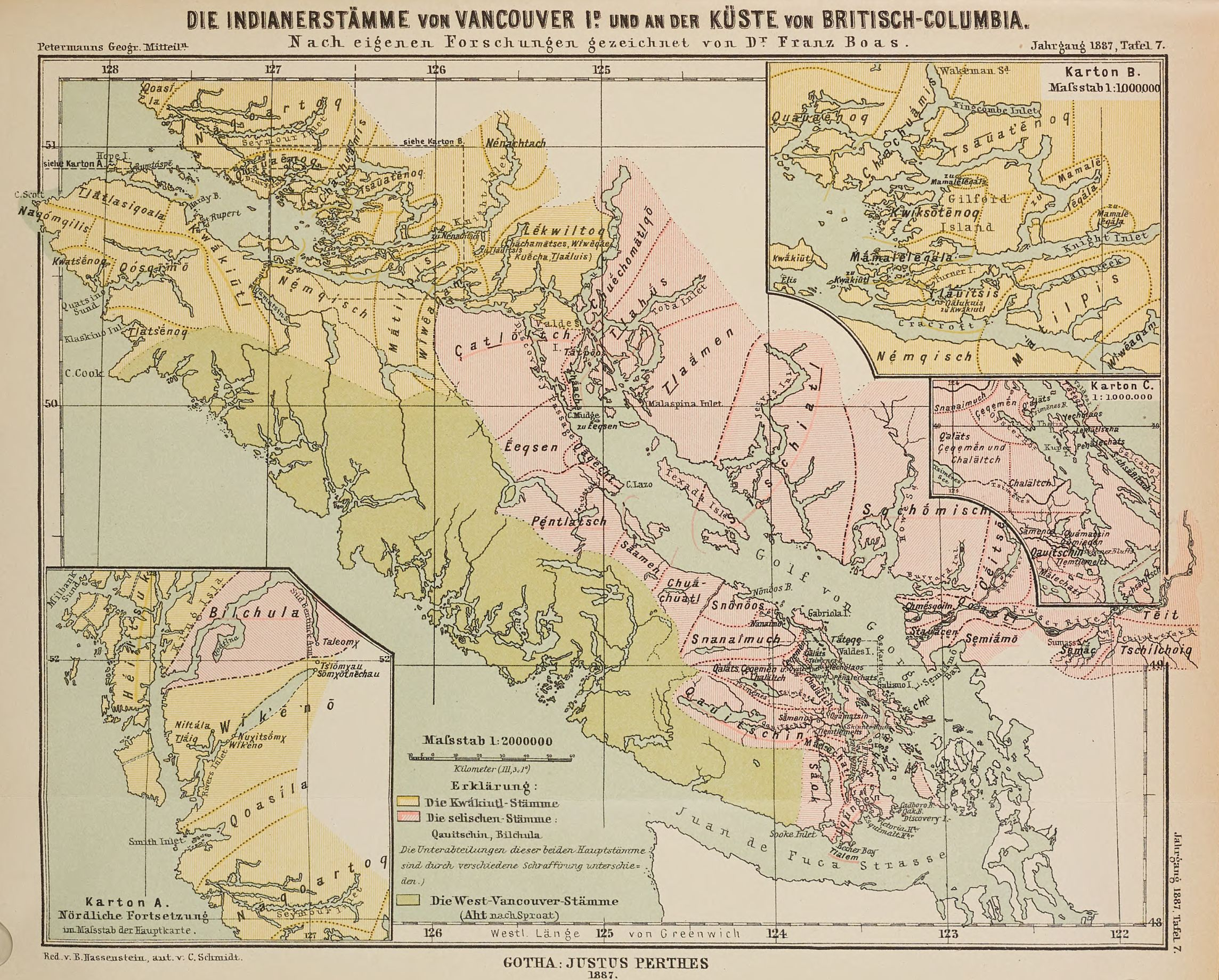
Dr. Franz Boas 1887 map showing Lekwungen territories

The Lekwungen were one of the few First Nations in BC to have a treaty with the British. Sir James Douglas, governor of the Vancouver Island colony, negotiated a treaty with the Lekwungen in 1850.

The Lekwungen considered that the government of British Columbia had failed to honour the 1850 treaty and commenced a legal action against the province and the Government of Canada for redress. A settlement of the action was announced in November 2006 by Songhees Chief Robert Sam, the federal Minister of Indian Affairs and Northern Development, Jim Prentice, and the provincial Minister of Aboriginal Relations and Reconciliation, Mike de Jong.

=== Esquimalt First Nation ===
They were signatories of the Douglas Treaties as the Kosapsum. x̣ʷiméɫǝɫ (Esquimalt) is the term which was originally used to describe the specific location of a group of Songhees people living near the mouth of the Mill Stream at the head of present-day Esquimalt Harbour. x̣ʷiméɫǝɫ was translated by J. W. McKay during the negotiation of the Douglas Treaties as meaning “a place of gradually shoaling”. Over time, the term “Esquimalt” came to be applied more generally to the harbour area and to a group of people living at the village known as Kalla, located on the northern shore of Plumper Bay (archaeological site DcRu-36). The contemporary Esquimalt Nation comprises descendants of the signatories of the Kosapsum Treaty, rather than the original group of individuals after whom the name originated. This latter group signed a distinct treaty known as the Whyomilth (Esquimalt) Treaty.

== See also ==
- Songhees First Nation
- Esquimalt First Nation
