= Saanich dialect =

Language of the Saanich people of North America

Saanich
- SENĆOŦEN
- Pronunciation: [sənˈt͡ʃas̪ən]
- Native to: Canada, United States
- Region: British Columbia, Washington
- Ethnicity: Saanich people
- Native speakers: ca. 5 (2014)
- Language family: Salishan: Coast; Central; Salishan; North Straits; Saanich
- Writing system: SENĆOŦEN; Sometimes NAPA

Official status
- Official language in: Pauquachin; Tsawout; Tsartlip; Tseycum

Language codes
- ISO 639-3: (covered by str Straits Salish)
- Glottolog: saan1246

- People: W̱SÁNEĆ
- Language: SENĆOŦEN
- Country: ÁLEṈENEȻ (TŦE W̱SÁNEĆ)

Saanich (Saanich: SENĆOŦEN IPA: [sənˈt͡ʃas̪ən]) is the variety of North Straits Salish spoken by the Saanich people in the Pacific Northwest of North America. North Straits Salish is a dialect continuum, the varieties of which are closely related to the Klallam language.

== Revitalization ==
"The W̱SÁNEĆ School Board, together with the FirstVoices program for revitalizing Aboriginal languages, is working to teach a new generation to speak SENĆOŦEN" at the ȽÁU¸WELṈEW̱ Tribal School. The first Grade 12 class graduated in June 2026.

=== SENĆOŦEN texting, mobile app and portal ===
A Saanich texting app was released in 2012. A SENĆOŦEN iPhone app was released in October 2011. An online dictionary, phrasebook, and language learning portal is available at the First Voices SENĆOŦEN Community Portal.

== Phonology ==
=== Vowels ===
Saanich has no rounded vowels in native vocabulary. As in many languages, vowels are strongly affected by uvular consonants.

	Front	Central	Back
Close	i	ə	(u)
Mid	e	ə	
Open	e	ɑ	

- /i/ is [ɪ] adjacent to a uvular or labialized uvular consonant, or preceding /ʔ/.
- /u/ is found only in loanwords, e.g. CEPU /kəˈpu/ 'coat', ultimately from French capote.
- /e/ is [e̞]—rarely as low as [ɛ]—adjacent to a uvular or labio-uvular consonant or preceding /ʔ/. It is closer—almost [i]—next to a lateral, postalveolar, or /w/. Montler (1986) had formerly stated this vowel never occurs as [æ], but later contradicted this claim in Montler (2018).
- /ə/ is generally mid central, but becomes [ɑ̝] adjacent to a uvular or labialized uvular, or a laryngeal obstruent, and especially between two such consonants, whether or not it is stressed. When unstressed, it is [ɨ] following post-alveolars and before sonorants (including /ɴ/), and it is [ʉ] before the labialized obstruents.
- /ɑ/ is [ɐ] before /j/. It is also affected by uvulars and /ʔ/, being more backed.

=== Consonants ===
The following table includes all the sounds found in the North Straits dialects. No one dialect includes them all. Plosives are not aspirated, but are not voiced either. Ejectives have weak glottalization.

Consonants
		Bilabial	Dental	Alveolar		Palatal (-alveolar)	Velar		Uvular		Glottal
		Bilabial	Dental	median	lateral	Palatal (-alveolar)	plain	lab.	plain	lab.	Glottal
Plosive/ Affricate	pulmonic	p		t		tʃ	(k)	kʷ	q	qʷ	ʔ
Plosive/ Affricate	ejective	pʼ	t̪s̪ʼ	tʼ	tɬʼ	tʃʼ		kʷʼ	qʼ	qʷʼ	ʔ
Fricative			s̪	s	ɬ	ʃ		xʷ	χ	χʷ	h
Sonorant	plain	m		n	l	j		w	ɴ		
Sonorant	glottalic	m̰		n̰	l̰	j̰		w̰	ɴ̰		

- /k/ is found only in loanwords, as in CEPU /kəˈpu/ above.
- /t̪s̪ʼ s̪/ are most often realized as grooved fricatives [t̪s̪ʼ s̪], and are only rarely realized as interdentals [t̪θʼ θ].
- The phonemic status of the glottalized sonorants (also known as resonants) in Salish languages is not agreed upon. Some linguists analyze them as unit phonemes, others as sequences of a plain sonorant and a glottal stop /ʔ/. For Saanich, Montler (1986) analyzes them as typically creaky voiced, though as [ʔR] following stress and [Rʔ] preceding stress; they do not occur in word-initial position. Montler (2018) reaffirms the creaky voice analysis.

Montler (1986) originally described the dorsal consonants /k, xʷ, q, χ, ɴ/ (as well as their labialized and glottalic counterparts) as more fronted in their place of articulation than their typical IPA values, noting the velars to be articulated as pre-velar [k̟, x̟ʷ], and the uvulars as post-velar [k̠, x̠, ŋ̠]. However, later sources do not maintain this distinction, and simply describe them as velar and uvular. This includes an updated description from Montler (2018), noting the velars as equivalent to English counterparts, (Note: With the comparisons /k/ with kick /kɪk/, /kʷ/ with quick /kwɪk/, /w/ with wow /waʊ/, and /xʷ/ with which /hwɪtʃ/) and the uvulars as having the tongue backed toward the uvula.

=== Stress ===
Saanich stress is phonemic. Each full word has one stressed syllable, either in the root or in a suffix, the position of which is lexically determined. "Secondary stress" is sometimes described, but this is merely a way of distinguishing lexical schwas (with "secondary stress", like all other vowels in a word) from epenthetic schwas ("unstressed").

== Orthography ==
Saanich alphabet SENĆOŦEN Sənčáθən
- Script type: Alphabet
- Period: 1978 to present
- Languages: North Straits Salish language Saanich language

Related scripts
- Parent systems: (Proto-writing): Egyptian hieroglyphs; Proto-Sinaitic alphabet; Phoenician alphabet; Greek alphabet; Old Italic script; Latin alphabet; English alphabet; Saanich alphabet

ISO 15924
- ISO 15924: Latn (215), Latin

Unicode
- Unicode alias: Latin
- Unicode range: U+0000 to U+007E Basic Latin and punctuation; U+00CD (Í); U+0106 (Ć); U+015A (Ś); U+0166 (Ŧ); U+023A (Ⱥ); U+023B (Ȼ); U+023D (Ƚ); U+023E (Ⱦ); U+1E30 (Ḱ); U+1DF48 (𝽈)

The Saanich orthography was created by Dave Elliott in 1978, by using a typewriter to combine Latin characters with other marks to create new characters. It is a unicase alphabet, using only uppercase letters with the single exception of a lower-case s for the third person possessive suffix.

SENĆOŦEN Orthography
A	Á	Ⱥ	B	C	Ć	Ȼ	D	E	H	I	Í
/e/		/ej/	/pʼ/	/k/	/tʃ/	/kʷ/	/tʼ/	/ə/	/h/	/i/	/əj/, /ɑj/
[ɛ ~ æ]	[e]	/ej/	/pʼ/	/k/	/tʃ/	/kʷ/	/tʼ/	/ə/	/h/	/i/	/əj/, /ɑj/
J	K	𝽈	Ḵ	Ḱ	L	L¸	Ƚ	M	M¸	N	N¸
/tʃʼ/	/qʼ/	/qʷʼ/	/q/	/qʷ/	/l/	/l̰/	/ɬ/	/m/	/m̰/	/n/	/n̰/
Ṉ	Ṉ¸	O	P	Q	S	Ś	T	Ⱦ	Ṯ	Ŧ	
/ɴ/	/ɴ̰/	/ɑ/	/p/	/kʷʼ/	/s/	/ʃ/	/t/	/t̪s̪ʼ/	/tɬʼ/	/s̪/	
U	U¸	W	W̱	X	X̱	Y	Y¸	Z	¸	s	
/u/, /w/	/(ə)w̰/, /uʔ/	/w/	/xʷ/	/χ/	/χʷ/	/j/	/j̰/	/z/	/ʔ/	/-s/	

The glottal stop /ʔ/ is written with a spacing cedilla ⟨¸⟩, or less formally with a comma ⟨,⟩. It is omitted at the beginning of words, and may be ignored in other contexts. The comma was the original orthography, but caused problems with electronic document searches and the like; Saanich dictionaries, spell-check, and increasingly common usage have switched to the cedilla, and in 2025 Unicode defined the spacing cedilla as a letter to prevent word breaks, another problem with the comma.

The suffixing ⟨-s⟩ is used to indicate third-person possessive (as in English his, hers, theirs, its). Occasionally, a prefixing /s/ is written as lowercase and attached instead to a previous word. According to Montler (2018), it also may appear in the middle of a word for unknown reasons.

The vowel /e/ is usually written ⟨Á⟩, unless it occurs next to a uvular consonant (/q qʷ qʼ qʷʼ χ χʷ ɴ ɴʷ/), in which case it is written ⟨A⟩, and pronounced with a more open realization. The latter is rare in the language.

The glottal stop ⟨¸⟩, glottalized sonorants ⟨L¸ M¸ N¸ Ṉ¸ U¸ Y¸⟩, and suffixing ⟨-s⟩ are not included in alphabetization. Conversely, the letter ⟨Z⟩ is included as the last letter of the alphabet, as can be seen on the W̱SÁNEĆ School Board's official SENĆOŦEN website. It is an outlier, as linguists have never mentioned the letter or sound in their studies, neither as a phoneme nor as an allophone of any other phonemes; according to the FirstVoices website, it only appears in SENĆOŦEN names. It is not included as part of the alphabet in Montler (2018)'s dictionary.

/VR̰/ often surfaces as [VʔR] when stressed, and this may be reflected in the orthography. For instance, [ʔeʔˈeʔlkʷəɴ] is spelled Á¸Á¸LȻEṈ rather than phonemic *Á¸ÁL¸ȻEṈ /ʔeʔˈel̰kʷəɴ/ in the Saanich dictionary, and [ʔaʔnχsət] is O¸NXSET rather than *ON¸XSET /ʔan̰χsət/.

Consonants
		Bilabial	Dental	Alveolar		Palatal (-alveolar)	Velar		Uvular		Glottal
		Bilabial	Dental	median	lateral	Palatal (-alveolar)	plain	lab.	plain	lab.	Glottal
Plosive/ Affricate	pulmonic	P		T		Ć	C	Ȼ	Ḵ	Ḱ	¸
Plosive/ Affricate	ejective	B	Ⱦ	D	Ṯ	J		Q	K	𝽈	¸
Fricative			Ŧ	S (Z)	Ƚ	Ś		W̱	X	X̱	H
Sonorant	plain	M		N	L	Y		W	Ṉ		
Sonorant	glottalic	M¸		N¸	L¸	Y¸		U¸	Ṉ¸		

=== Example text ===
Article 1 of the Universal Declaration of Human Rights:

Saanich:	EWENE SÁN E TŦE U¸ MEQ EȽTÁLṈEW̱ Ȼ SNI¸S SQÍEŦ E TŦE XĆṈINS. U¸ XENENEȻEL TŦE U¸ MEQ EȽTÁLṈEW̱ E Ȼ SI¸ÁM¸TEṈS. ĆŚḰÁLEȻEN TŦE U¸ MEQ SÁN. Í¸ Ȼ S¸Á¸ITEṈS TŦE U¸ MEQ SÁN X̱EN¸IṈ E TŦE SĆÁ¸ĆE¸S.
IPA:	/əwənə sen ə t̪s̪ʼə əw̰ məkʷʼ əɬtelɴəxʷ kʷ sniʔs skʷʼɑjəs̪ ə t̪s̪ʼə χt͡ʃɴins/ /əw̰ χənənəkʷəl t̪s̪ʼə əw̰ məkʷʼ əɬtelɴəxʷ kʷ siʔemʔtəɴs/ /t͡ʃʃqʷeləkʷen t̪s̪ʼə əw̰ məkʷʼ sen/ /əj̰ kʷ sʔeʔiteɴs t̪s̪ʼə əw̰ mekʷʼ sen χʷənʔiɴ ə t̪s̪ʼə st͡ʃeʔt͡ʃəʔs/
English original:	"All human beings are born free and equal in dignity and rights. They are endowed with reason and conscience and should act towards one another in a spirit of brotherhood."

=== Unicode ===
In 2004, four letters from the Saanich alphabet were added to the Unicode standard, and the barred K was accepted in 2024. In 2025, the properties of the spacing cedilla were changed to accommodate Saanich.

== Grammar ==
=== Metathesis ===
In Saanich, metathesis is used as a grammatical device to indicate "actual" aspect. The actual aspect is most commonly translated into English using the be + -ing progressive construction. It is formed from the “nonactual” verb form through a CV → VC metathesis process, in which the consonant and vowel switch positions.

ŦX̱ÉT 'shove' (nonactual)	→	ŦÉX̱T 'shoving' (actual)
ṮPÉX̱ 'scatter' (nonactual)	→	ṮÉPX̱ 'scattering' (actual)
ȾȽÉQ 'pinch' (nonactual)	→	ȾÉȽQ 'pinching' (actual)

== Bibliography ==
- Bill, Adriane; Cayou, Roxanne; Jim, Jacquelin (2003), NEȾE NEḰȺ SḴELÁLṈEW̱ [One Green Tree], Victoria, B.C.: First Peoples' Cultural Foundation & ȽÁU¸WELṈEW̱ Tribal School, ISBN 1-4120-0626-0
- Mithun, Marianne. (1999). The Languages of Native North America. Cambridge: Cambridge University Press. ISBN 0-521-23228-7 (hbk); ISBN 0-521-29875-X.
- Montler, Timothy (1986), "An Outline of the Morphology and Phonology of Saanich, North Straits Salish", Occasional Papers in Linguistics (4), Missoula, MT: University of Montana Linguistics Laboratory (Web version of the author's PhD dissertation, University of Hawaiʻi).
- Montler, Timothy. (1996). Languages and Dialects in Straits Salishan. Proceedings of the International Conference on Salish and Neighboring Languages, 31, 249–256.
- Montler, Timothy. (1999). Language and Dialect Variation in Straits Salishan. Anthropological Linguistics, 41 (4), 462–502.
- Montler, Timothy. (2018). SENĆOŦEN: A Dictionary of the Saanich Language. Seattle: University of Washington Press.
- Thompson, Laurence; Thompson, M. Terry; & Efrat, Barbara. (1974). Some Phonological Developments in Straits Salish. International Journal of American Linguistics, 40, 182–196.
- YELḰÁTȾE [Claxton, Earl, Sr.]; & STOLȻEȽ [Elliot, John, Sr.]. (1994). Reef Net Technology of the Saltwater People. Brentwood Bay, B.C.: Saanich Indian School Board.
