= Tseycum First Nation =

First Nation on Vancouver Island

Tseycum First Nation (SENĆOŦEN: W̱SÍḴEM, meaning "place of clay") is a W̱SÁNEĆ Coast Salish First Nation located on the Saanich Peninsula of southern Vancouver Island in British Columbia, Canada. Tseycum is one of the communities of the W̱SÁNEĆ peoples, whose traditional territory includes the Saanich Peninsula, the southern Gulf Islands, and surrounding marine areas of the Salish Sea.

The Nation is among the signatories to the Douglas Treaties, agreements signed between representatives of the British Crown and several Coast Salish communities between 1850 and 1854.

== Name ==
The traditional name of the community is W̱SÍḴEM, a word from the SENĆOŦEN language meaning "place of clay." The name refers to clay-rich soils historically found in the area. The English spelling Tseycum is an anglicized rendering derived from the original SENĆOŦEN name.

Members of Tseycum are part of the broader W̱SÁNEĆ cultural and linguistic community, whose traditional language is SENĆOŦEN.

== Location and territory ==
Tseycum First Nation is located on the Saanich Peninsula near Sidney, British Columbia. The Nation's traditional territory forms part of the broader W̱SÁNEĆ territory, which includes the Saanich Peninsula, the southern Gulf Islands, and surrounding waters of the Salish Sea.

Like other W̱SÁNEĆ communities, Tseycum has longstanding relationships with the marine environment, including fishing, reef-net fishing, shellfish harvesting, and travel throughout the Gulf Islands and nearby waterways.

Traditional W̱SÁNEĆ harvesting sites historically existed throughout the area now occupied by the Victoria International Airport, including Bazan Bay, which served as a gathering location for camas, shellfish, and sea urchins and as a canoe launch point for travel to Gulf Island harvesting areas.

== History ==
=== Douglas Treaties ===
Tseycum First Nation is one of several W̱SÁNEĆ communities whose leaders were signatories to the North and South Saanich Treaties, also known as the Douglas Treaties, signed between 1850 and 1852 with the colonial government of Vancouver Island. These agreements affirmed the continued rights of W̱SÁNEĆ peoples to hunt, fish, and carry out cultural practices on traditional lands and waters.

=== Significance of the Douglas Treaties ===
The interpretation and legal status of the Douglas Treaties have been the subject of ongoing legal and political discussion. Courts in British Columbia have recognized that the treaties remain legally binding and continue to protect Indigenous harvesting rights.

W̱SÁNEĆ Nations, including Tseycum, have participated in efforts to clarify and assert the rights affirmed in the treaties, particularly regarding marine harvesting and access to traditional territories in the Salish Sea.

=== McKenna–McBride Commission ===
During the McKenna–McBride Royal Commission on Indian Affairs (1913–1916), representatives of W̱SÁNEĆ communities appeared before the commission to address proposed changes to reserve lands. Edward Jim of the Tseycum Indian Band testified that he did not wish to give up reserve land because it contained the homes and burial places of earlier generations.

His testimony reflected broader concerns among W̱SÁNEĆ leaders regarding the protection of ancestral sites and the preservation of reserve lands.

=== Early political advocacy ===
In 1919, W̱SÁNEĆ Chief Edward Jim of Tseycum wrote to the Canadian Department of Indian Affairs regarding a proposal allowing a settler to obtain reserve land on Pender Island for agricultural use. In the letter, Chief Jim declined the request and reminded officials that W̱SÁNEĆ communities had already lost significant portions of their lands.

The letter concluded with a closing written partly in Chinook Jargon, a trade language widely used throughout the Pacific Northwest during the nineteenth and early twentieth centuries.

=== Twentieth-century leadership ===
Throughout the twentieth century, leaders from Tseycum and neighbouring W̱SÁNEĆ communities participated in regional Indigenous political organizing aimed at protecting treaty rights, burial sites, and traditional territories.

These efforts formed part of broader Indigenous political movements across British Columbia seeking recognition of land rights and protection of cultural heritage sites.

=== Repatriation of ancestral remains ===
In 2008, Tseycum First Nation participated in an effort to repatriate ancestral remains held by the American Museum of Natural History in New York. Chief Vern Jacks was among the leaders involved in negotiations to return the remains to W̱SÁNEĆ territory for reburial.

=== West Saanich Road burial site settlement ===
In 2012, the Province of British Columbia reached an agreement with Tseycum First Nation concerning the construction of West Saanich Road across a burial site within reserve land decades earlier. The settlement included compensation and commitments to improved consultation regarding cultural heritage sites.

=== Shellfish harvesting restoration ===
In the early 2010s, Tseycum First Nation began efforts to restore traditional shellfish harvesting in Patricia Bay. Community members worked with environmental partners to improve water quality and restore clam beds that had been closed due to contamination concerns.

=== Grace Islet burial site dispute ===
In 2014, Tseycum First Nation was involved in a dispute concerning the protection of an ancient burial site located on Grace Islet near Saltspring Island. The site became the focus of public attention after residential development was approved on the island. Chief Vern Jacks and other W̱SÁNEĆ leaders called for stronger protection of burial sites and cultural heritage areas.

=== Saturna Island logging debate ===
In 2019, logging activity on Saturna Island Reserve No. 7 drew regional attention and debate. The reserve land is jointly held by Tsawout and Tseycum First Nations. Logging operations began in early 2019 and involved clear-cut harvesting in areas of the reserve.

The activity generated discussion among local residents, environmental advocates, and members of neighbouring First Nations regarding environmental impacts and the management of culturally significant lands. The situation highlighted broader tensions between economic development opportunities and conservation concerns in the Gulf Islands region.

Community commentary also emphasized the importance of the area for traditional harvesting and cultural activities among W̱SÁNEĆ peoples.

=== PKOLS name restoration movement ===
W̱SÁNEĆ communities, including Tseycum First Nation, have supported efforts to restore the traditional name PKOLS to the mountain known as Mount Douglas in Saanich. PKOLS holds cultural and spiritual significance within W̱SÁNEĆ oral history and creation narratives.

== Traditional governance ==
Prior to the establishment of the reserve system and the imposition of band council governance under the Indian Act in the late nineteenth century, W̱SÁNEĆ communities including Tseycum were organized through systems of hereditary leadership and family-based stewardship.

Leadership roles were held by respected individuals from extended families who carried responsibilities related to particular territories, reef-net fishing sites, resource areas, and ceremonial obligations. Authority was exercised through kinship networks, consensus, and cultural law rather than through elected political offices.

Certain families held stewardship responsibilities for specific reef-net fishing locations, village sites, and harvesting areas. These rights and responsibilities were inherited across generations and were governed by cultural protocols and laws that regulated access to resources and maintained relationships among families and neighbouring communities.

Decision-making within W̱SÁNEĆ communities traditionally occurred through discussions among hereditary leaders, knowledge holders, and families. These governance systems emphasized the protection of land, waters, and community wellbeing and were closely tied to the cultural teachings and responsibilities passed down through oral tradition.

Following the establishment of Indian reserves and the introduction of the Indian Act governance system in the late nineteenth and early twentieth centuries, elected band councils gradually replaced many traditional governance structures in administrative matters. However, hereditary leadership and cultural governance practices continue to play an important role in W̱SÁNEĆ cultural life and community decision-making.

Historical records and community oral histories identify Edward Jim as a hereditary leader from Tseycum. Contemporary leadership within the community has also included individuals from the same extended family line, including Chief Vern Jacks Sr., reflecting the continuing presence of hereditary family networks alongside the modern elected band council system. Edward Jim, a hereditary leader from Tseycum, is documented in early twentieth-century correspondence with the Canadian Department of Indian Affairs concerning reserve lands and territorial rights. Members of the same extended family lineage have continued to play roles in the community's leadership, including former Chief Vern Jacks Sr.

== Governance ==
Tseycum First Nation is governed by an elected Chief and Council.

Historically, elections were conducted under the Indian Act, which generally established two-year terms for elected leadership.

In 2019, Tseycum transitioned to the First Nations Elections Act, a federal legislative framework governing elections for participating First Nations. The transition was approved through regulation published in the Canada Gazette. The first election under the Act was held on 25 July 2019.

== Notable leaders ==
- Edward Jim – early 20th-century W̱SÁNEĆ leader who corresponded with the Canadian government regarding land protection.
- Vern Jacks – Chief of Tseycum First Nation during the late 2000s and early 2010s and involved in cultural heritage advocacy.
- Tanya Jimmy – Chief of Tseycum First Nation since 2013.

Position	Name	Term start	Term end
Chief	Vern Jacks Sr.	2009	2011
Chief	Tanya Jimmy	2013	2015
Chief	Tanya Jimmy	2015	2017
Chief	Tanya Jimmy	2017	2019
Chief	Tanya Jimmy	2019	2023
Chief	Tanya Jimmy	2023	Present

As of the 2023 election, the council includes Chief Tanya Jimmy and councillors Robin Joseph Bill and Brian Jimmy.

=== Laws and regulatory authority ===
Tseycum First Nation has enacted several laws governing matters within its jurisdiction.

These include the Tseycum First Nation Financial Administration Law (2017), which establishes financial management rules for budgeting, financial reporting, and accountability in the management of community funds.

The Nation has also enacted the Tseycum First Nation Cannabis Law, published in the First Nations Gazette, regulating the possession, sale, and distribution of cannabis on reserve lands.

=== Land governance ===
Members of Tseycum First Nation voted to adopt a land code under the First Nations Land Management Act. A land code allows participating First Nations to assume control over the management and administration of reserve lands and resources, replacing land management provisions of the Indian Act.

== Regional agreements and partnerships ==
Tseycum First Nation participates in regional governance initiatives with other W̱SÁNEĆ communities through the W̱SÁNEĆ Leadership Council.

In 2025, Tseycum and Tsartlip First Nations signed a Memorandum of Understanding with the Capital Regional District establishing a government-to-government framework for collaboration on regional planning, environmental stewardship, cultural heritage protection, and land management.

=== Victoria International Airport Friendship Agreement ===
In February 2026, the W̱SÁNEĆ Nations — Pauquachin, Tsartlip, Tsawout, and Tseycum — signed a long-term Friendship Agreement with the Victoria Airport Authority. The agreement acknowledges that the airport operates within W̱SÁNEĆ traditional territory and establishes a framework for collaboration on cultural recognition, environmental stewardship, and economic participation.

The agreement includes provisions for annual economic contributions, employment and training opportunities, and formal mechanisms for W̱SÁNEĆ participation in discussions related to airport operations and future development.

== Federal funding and administration ==
Like many First Nations in Canada operating under the Indian Act system of governance, Tseycum First Nation receives federal funding through agreements with the Government of Canada administered primarily by Indigenous Services Canada.

These agreements support the delivery of programs and services including governance, housing, infrastructure, education, health services, and community development.

Under federal funding agreements, First Nations are required to prepare annual audited consolidated financial statements and maintain financial accountability systems for the administration of federal transfers.

== Economy and infrastructure ==
Tseycum First Nation has developed community infrastructure projects including a Childcare and Wellness Centre in North Saanich, British Columbia. The facility provides childcare services, health programming, and space for community gatherings and cultural programming.

== Language ==
Members of Tseycum First Nation traditionally speak SENĆOŦEN, a Coast Salish language used by the W̱SÁNEĆ peoples of southern Vancouver Island.

SENĆOŦEN is closely related to other Northern Straits Salish languages spoken throughout the Salish Sea region. The language spoken by the Lummi Nation in Washington State is closely related and mutually intelligible with SENĆOŦEN.

== Traditional economy ==
Historically, W̱SÁNEĆ communities including Tseycum practiced reef-net fishing (SENĆOŦEN: SX̱OLE), a method of harvesting salmon using nets suspended between canoes positioned along underwater reef formations.

Reef-net sites were managed by hereditary families and formed an important economic and social system among W̱SÁNEĆ peoples.

Mandarte Island, administered today as Bare Island Indian Reserve No. 9 under Tseycum First Nation, lies near historically significant reef-net fishing areas in the southern Gulf Islands.

The practice declined after colonial fishing regulations restricted Indigenous reef-net fisheries during the early twentieth century.

Since 2014, W̱SÁNEĆ communities have worked to revitalize reef-net fishing through cultural and youth programs organized by the W̱SÁNEĆ Leadership Council.

== Culture ==
Members of Tseycum First Nation are part of the Coast Salish cultural tradition. Cultural practices include fishing, canoe travel, reef-net fishing, and ceremonial gatherings shared among W̱SÁNEĆ communities.

W̱SÁNEĆ oral traditions describe the cultural and spiritual significance of the surrounding land and waters, including the mountain known as PKOLS, which features prominently in creation narratives.

== Demographics ==
According to Indigenous Services Canada, Tseycum First Nation had a registered population of approximately 172 members as of 2026.

== Indian reserves ==
Indian reserves administered by Tseycum First Nation include:

- Bare Island Indian Reserve No. 9 (Mandarte Island)
- Goldstream Indian Reserve No. 13
- Pender Island Indian Reserve No. 8
- Saturna Island Indian Reserve No. 7
- Union Bay Indian Reserve No. 4

== W̱SÁNEĆ Nation ==
Tseycum First Nation is one of several W̱SÁNEĆ communities, alongside Tsartlip, Tsawout, Pauquachin, and Malahat First Nations. These communities share language, cultural traditions, and ancestral territory across the Saanich Peninsula and southern Gulf Islands.

== See also ==
- W̱SÁNEĆ
- SENĆOŦEN language
- Douglas Treaties
- First Nations Elections Act
