= North Straits Salish language =

Salishan dialect continuum

North Straits Salish
- SENĆOŦEN / Malchosen / Siʔneməš / Lekwungen / Semiahmoo / T’Sou-ke
- Native to: Canada, United States
- Region: Vancouver Island, British Columbia; Washington
- Native speakers: 180 in Canada (2021 census)
- Language family: Salishan: Coast; Central; Straits Salish; North Straits Salish
- Dialects: Lummi; Saanich; Samish; Semiahmoo †; Songhees †; T'sou-ke †

Language codes
- ISO 639-3: str
- Glottolog: stra1244
- ELP: Northern Straits Salish

- Northern Straits Salish is classified as Critically Endangered by the UNESCO Atlas of the World's Languages in Danger.

Northern Straits Salish (also North Straits Salish) is a Coast Salish language of western Washington and British Columbia. It has several mutually intelligible dialects, which have often been treated as separate languages, both historically and today. Speakers recognize the similarities between the dialects but have no name for the language as a whole.

Northern Straits Salish is notable for the frequent use of a dorsal nasal consonant /ŋ~ɴ/, rare in other languages of the Pacific Northwest.

== Dialects ==
Northern Straits has the following dialects. Those marked with a dagger (†) have no native speakers.

- Lummi (Xwlemi Chosen)
- Saanich (SENĆOŦEN, (Note: NAPA: sənčáθən) W̱SÁNEĆḴEN (Note: NAPA: xʷsénəčqən))
- Samish (Xws7ámeshqen)
- (†) Semiahmoo
- (†) Lekwungen (lək̓ʷəŋiʔnəŋ; also known as Songhees or Songish)
- (†) T'Sou-ke (also known as Sooke)

== Classification ==
Northern Straits is a Salishan language of the Coast Salish branch. With Klallam, it forms the Straits Salish subgroup. The two languages are very closely related but are no longer mutually intelligible.

Early researchers disagreed on how to group the dialects of Northern Straits and Klallam into languages. In 1863, ethnologist George Gibbs treated Klallam, Sooke, and Songhees as one language and Lummi, Saanich, and Semiahmoo as another; he placed Samish in Lushootseed, a separate Coast Salish language. The missionary Myron Eells considered Lummi a dialect of Klallam, and German anthropologist Franz Boas counted Klallam and Northern Straits as a single language. Canadian anthropologist Charles Hill-Tout classified Sooke, Saanich, Songhees, Lummi, and Klallam as one language, "Lekonenen", and Songhees as a second, "Lekunen". Hill-Tout took these to be language names, but they derive from the Songhees words lək̓ʷəŋiʔnəŋ (the Songhees name for their own dialect) and lək̓ʷəŋən (their name for the Songhees people).

== Bibliography ==
- Thompson, Laurence C.; Thompson, M. Terry; Efrat, Barbara S. (1974). "Some Phonological Developments in Straits Salish". International Journal of American Linguistics. 40 (3): 182–196. doi:10.1086/465311. S2CID 144820134.
