= List of communities in British Columbia =

Communities in the province of British Columbia, Canada, can include incorporated municipalities, Indian reserves, unincorporated communities or localities. Unincorporated communities can be further classified as recreational or urban.

== Indian reserves ==
Indian Reserves are administered under a separate legal designation from other communities. Under the division of powers in Canadian law, First Nations (formally and still legally defined as Indians) fall under federal jurisdiction, while non-Aboriginal communities are part of a separate system that is largely the responsibility of the Provinces.

Indian reserves of British Columbia
Name	Government/band	Tribal council	Ethnic or national group	Communities/location	Comments	Population (2016)
Ahahswinis 1	Hupacasath First Nation	Nuu-chah-nulth Tribal Council	Nuu-chah-nulth	Port Alberni		119
Ahaminaquus 12	Mowachaht/Muchalaht First Nations	Nuu-chah-nulth Tribal Council	Nuu-chah-nulth	Gold River	Full list of Mowachath/Muchalaht reserves	0
Ahous 16	Ahousaht First Nation	Nuu-chah-nulth Tribal Council	Nuu-chah-nulth	Vargas Island, Clayoquot Sound	Full list of Ahousaht First Nation reserves	622
Aitchelitch 9	Aitchelitz First Nation	Sto:lo Nation	Sto:lo	Chilliwack	Full list of Aitchelitz reserves	15
Alert Bay 1	Namgis First Nation	Musgamagw Tsawataineuk Tribal Council	'Namgis (Kwakwaka'wakw)	Alert Bay		213
Alert Bay 1A	Namgis First Nation	Musgamagw Tsawataineuk Tribal Council	'Namgis (Kwakwaka'wakw)	Alert Bay	see 'Yalis / Full list of Namgis reserves	252
Alexandria 1	Alexandria First Nation	Tsilhqot'in National Government	Tsilhqot'in	Alexandria (S of Quesnel)	Full list of Alexandria reserves	15
Alexandria 1A	Alexandria First Nation	Tsilhqot'in National Government	Tsilhqot'in	Alexandria (S of Quesnel)	Full list of Alexandria reserves	0
Alexandria 3	Alexandria First Nation	Tsilhqot'in National Government	Tsilhqot'in	Alexandria (S of Quesnel)	Full list of Alexandria reserves	15
Alexandria 3A	Alexandria First Nation	Tsilhqot'in National Government	Tsilhqot'in	Alexandria (S of Quesnel)	Full list of Alexandria reserves	5
Alexis 9	Lower Similkameen Indian Band	Okanagan Nation Alliance	Syilx	4 miles west of Keremeos	Full list of Lower Similkameen reserves	10
Alkali Lake 1	Alkali Lake Indian Band (Esketemc First Nation)	N/A	Secwepemc	Alkali Lake	Full list of Esketemc reserves	328
Alkali Lake 4A	Alkali Lake Indian Band (Esketemc First Nation)	N/A	Secwepemc	Alkali Lake	Full list of Esketemc reserves	10
Alkhili 2	Taku River Tlingit	Daak Ka Tlingit Nation	Inland Tlingit	2 miles E of Fourth of July Bay, Atlin Lake, 3 miles NE of Atlin	Complete list of Taku River Tlingit reserves	No Data
Anacla 12	Huu-ay-aht First Nations	Nuu-chah-nulth Tribal Council	Nuu-chah-nulth	Pacheena River, Barkley Sound	HQ at Bamfield / Full list of Huu-ay-aht reserves	82
Anahim's Flat 1	Tl'etinqox-t'in Government Office (Anaham Reserve First Nations)	Tsilhqot'in National Government	Tsilhqot'in	Alexis Creek, Chilcotin District	Indian and Northern Affairs Canada - Full list of Tl'etinqox-t'in reserves	342
Anahim's Meadow	Tl'etinqox-t'in Government Office (Anaham Reserve First Nations)	Tsilhqot'in National Government	Tsilhqot'in	Alexis Creek, Chilcotin District	Indian and Northern Affairs Canada - Full list of Tl'etinqox-t'in reserves	10
Anahim's Meadow 2A	Tl'etinqox-t'in Government Office (Anaham Reserve First Nations)	Tsilhqot'in National Government	Tsilhqot'in	Alexis Creek, Chilcotin District	Indian and Northern Affairs Canada - Full list of Tl'etinqox-t'in reserves	0
Ashnola 10	Lower Similkameen Indian Band	Okanagan Nation Alliance	Syilx	Ashnola	Full list of Lower Similkameen Indian Band reserves	83
Ashcroft 4	Ashcroft Indian Band	Nlaka'pamux Nation Tribal Council & Fraser Canyon Indian Administration	Nlaka'pamux	Ashcroft		68
Apsagayu 1A	Mamalilikulla-Qwe'Qwa'Sot'Em First Nation	Kwakiutl District Council	Kwakwaka'wakw	Shoal Harbour, Gilford Island	Complete list of Mamalilikulla-Qwe'Qwa'Sot'Em reserves	No Data
Asahal Lake 2	Williams Lake First Nation	Northern Shuswap Tribal Council	Secwepemc	3 miles N of E end of Willams Lake (the lake)	Complete list of Williams Lake reserves	No Data
Atlin-Teslin Indian Cemetery 4	Taku River Tlingit	Daak Ka Tlingit Nation	Inland Tlingit	E shore Atlin Lake, 1 mile S of Atlin	Complete list of Taku River Tlingit reserves	No Data
Aywawwis 15	Union Bar First Nation	N/A	Sto:lo	on the Fraser River, N of the mouth of the Coquihalla River	Complete list of Union Bar reserves	No Data
Bare Island 9	Tsawout First Nation		Coast Salish	whole of Mandarte Island, head of Haro Strait	Complete list of Tsawout reserves	No Data
Becher Bay 1	Beecher Bay First Nation		Coast Salish	near Metchosin/Sooke	Complete list of Beecher Bay reserves	129
Becher Bay 2	Beecher Bay First Nation		Coast Salish	near Metchosin/Sooke	Complete list of Beecher Bay reserves	No Data
Bella Bella 1			Heiltsuk	Waglisla		1,019
Bella Coola 1	Nuxalk Nation		Nuxalk	Bella Coola		807
Blind Creek 6	Lower Similkameen Indian Band	Okanagan Nation Alliance	Syilx	Keremeos	Full list of Lower Similkameen reserves	26
Blind Creek 6A	Lower Similkameen Indian Band	Okanagan Nation Alliance	Syilx	Keremeos	Full list of Lower Similkameen reserves	No Data
Blueberry River 205						197
Bonaparte 3	Bonaparte Indian Band	Shuswap Nation Tribal Council	Secwepemc	Cache Creek	Full list of Bonaparte First Nation reserves	121
Bridge River 1	Bridge River Indian Band	Lillooet Tribal Council	St'at'imc	Lillooet & Moha		241
Burns Lake 18	Burns Lake Indian Band		Wet'suwet'en (Dakelh)	Burns Lake		48
Burrard Inlet 3	Tsleil-waututh First Nation		Coast Salish	North Vancouver	birthplace of Chief Dan George	1,855
Campbell River 11	Campbell River First Nation	Kwakiutl District Council	Weywakum, Laich-kwil-tach (Kwakwaka'wakw)	Campbell River		381
Canim Lake 1	Canim Lake Indian Band		Secwepemc	Canim Lake		228
Canim Lake 2	Canim Lake Indian Band		Secwepemc	Canim Lake		5
Carpenter Mountain 15	Williams Lake First Nation	Northern Shuswap Tribal Council	Secwepemc	near 156 Mile Post on the Old Cariboo Road (N of Williams Lake)	Complete list of Williams Lake reserves	No Data
Cayoosh Creek 1	Cayoose Creek Indian Band (Sek'welwas)	Lillooet Tribal Council	St'at'imc	Lillooet		66
Chawathil 4	Chawathil First Nation	Stó:lō Tribal Council	Sto:lo	Katz (near Hope)	Complete list of Chawathil reserves	186
Cheakamus 11,	Squamish Nation	N/A	Squamish	Squamish/Brackendale	Site of traditional village, Chiyakmesh. Full list of Squamish Nation reserves	57
Cheam 1	Cheam First Nation	Sto:lo Tribal Council	Sto:lo	Rosedale	Complete list of all Cheam reserves	202
Chehalis 5	Chehalis First Nation	N/A	Sts'Ailes	right bank of Harrison River, Chehalis	Complete list of all Chehalis reserves	537
Chehalis 6	Chehalis First Nation	N/A	Sts'Ailes	left bank of Harrison River, Chehalis, opposite Chehalis IR 5	Complete list of all Chehalis reserves	No Data
Chemainus 13	Chemainus First Nation	Naut'sa mawt Tribal Council	Coast Salish	Chemainus		735
Chenahkint 12	Ehattesaht First Nation	Nuu-chah-nulth Tribal Council	Nuu-chah-nulth	on Queens Cove, east shore of Port Eliza	Complete list of Ehattasaht reserves	0
Cheslatta 1	Cheslatta Indian Band		Dakelh	Cheslatta Lake		84
Chilco Lake 1	Xeni Gwetin First Nation	Tsilhqot'in National Government	Tsilhqot'in	Nemaia Valley		5
Chilco Lake 1A	Xeni Gwetin First Nation	Tsilhqot'in National Government	Tsilhqot'in	Nemaia Valley		25
Chilhil 6	Fountain Indian Band	Lillooet Tribal Council	St'at'imc	Fountain Valley/Lillooet Country	Full list of all Xaxli'p (Fountain) reserves	70
Chimney Creek 5	Williams Lake First Nation	Northern Shuswap Tribal Council	Secwepemc	left bank of Frser River at mouth of Chimney Creek	Complete list of Williams Lake reserves	No Data
Chopaka 7 & 8	Lower Similkameen Indian Band	Okanagan Nation Alliance	Syilx	Chopaka (S of Keremeos)	Full list of Lower Similkameen reserves	81
Chuchuwayha 2	Upper Similkameen First Nation	Okanagan Nation Alliance	Okanagan	Hedley	Complete list of Upper Similkameen reserves	58
Chuchuwayha 2C	Upper Similkameen First Nation	Okanagan Nation Alliance	Okanagan	4 miles southwest of Hedley	Complete list of Upper Similkameen reserves	No Data
Coldwater 1	Coldwater Indian Band	Nicola Tribal Association	Scw'exmx (Nlaka'pamux)	Merritt		318
Cole Bay 3	Pauquachin First Nation		Coast Salish	Cole Bay, Saanich Inlet	Complete list of Pauquachin reserves	332
Columbia Lake 3	?Akisq'nuk First Nation (Columbia Lake Indian Band)	Ktunaxa Kinbasket Tribal Council	Ktunaxa	Columbia Lake/Canal Flats	Complete list of ?Akisq'nuk reserves	140
Comox 1	K'ómoks First Nation	Kwakiutl District Council	Comox/Kwakwaka'wakw	Comox		222
Compton Island 6	Mamalilikulla-Qwe'Qwa'Sot'Em First Nation	Kwakiutl District Council	Kwakwaka'wakw	all of Compton Island, between Harbledown and Swanson Islands	Complete list of Mamalilikulla-Qwe'Qwa'Sot'Em reserves	No Data
Coquitlam 1	Kwikwetlem First Nation		Sto:lo	Coquitlam	Complete list of Kwikwetlem reserves	54
Coquitlam 2	Kwikwetlem First Nation		Sto:lo	Coquitlam	Complete list of Kwikwetlem reserves	0
Cowichan Lake 1		Cowichan Tribes	Quw'utsun (Coast Salish)	Cowichan Lake		
Cowichan 1		Cowichan Tribes		Duncan		
Cowishil 1	Uchucklesaht First Nation	Nuu-chah-nulth Tribal Council	Nuu-chah-nulth	Burroughs Point, west entrance of Uchucklesit Harbour, Barkley Sound	Complete list of Uchucklesaht reserves	
Creston 1		Ktunaxa Kinbasket Tribal Council	Ktunaxa	Creston		
Cumshewas 7		Council of the Haida Nation	Haida	Cumshewa		
Dease River 1		Kaska Tribal Council	Kaska Dena	Dease Lake Post		
Deep Creek 2	Soda Creek/Deep Creek Indian Band	Northern Shuswap Tribal Council	Secwepemc			
Dog Creek 1	Canoe Creek/Dog Creek First Nation	Northern Shuswap Tribal Council	Secwepemc	Dog Creek/Gang Ranch		
Doig River 206						
Dolphin Island 1						
Douglas Lake 3	Douglas Lake First Nation	Nicola Tribal Association	Scw'exmx (Nlaka'pamux)	Douglas Lake/Merritt		
Dry Salmon 7	Fountain Indian Band	Lillooet Tribal Council	St'at'imc	Lillooet, at the Bridge River Fishing Grounds	Full list of all Xaxli'p (Fountain) reserves	
East Moberly Lake 169						
East Saanich 2	Tsawout First Nation		Coast Salish	north shore of Saanichton Bay, North Saanich	Complete list of Tsawout reserves	
Ehatis 11	Ehattesaht First Nation	Nuu-chah-nulth Tribal Council	Nuu-chah-nulth	head of Zeballos Arm, Esperanza Inlet	Complete list of Ehattasaht reserves	
Elhlateese 2	Uchucklesaht First Nation	Nuu-chah-nulth Tribal Council	Nuu-chah-nulth	head of Uchucklesit Harbour, Barkley Sound	Complete list of Uchucklesaht reserves	
Enderby 2	Armstrong First Nation	Okanagan Nation Alliance	Okanagan people (Sylix)	Enderby		
Esquimalt 1	Esquimalt First Nation		Coast Salish	Esquimalt		
Finlay Bay 21	McLeod Lake First Nation		Sekani	McLeod Lake		
Fish Lake 7	Fountain Indian Band	Lillooet Tribal Council	St'at'imc	Fountain Valley/Lillooet Country	Full list of all Xaxli'p (Fountain) reserves	
Five Mile 3	Williams Lake First Nation	Northern Shuswap Tribal Council	Secwepemc	4 miles N of 150 Mile House	Complete list of Williams Lake reserves	
Five Mile Point 3	Taku River Tlingit	Daak Ka Tlingit Nation	Inland Tlingit	at Five Mile Point, E shore Atlin Lake, S of Atlin	Complete list of Taku River Tlingit reserves	
Fort George (Shelly) 2			Lheidli T'enneh (Dakelh)	Prince George		
Fort Nelson 2						
Fort Ware 1	Kwadacha First Nation	Kaska Tribal Council		Fort Ware (Kwadacha)		
Fountain 1	Fountain Indian Band	Lillooet Tribal Council	St'at'imc	Fountain/Lillooet	traditional village Cacli'p or Xaxli'p; Full list of all Xaxli'p (Fountain) reserves	
Fountain 1A	Fountain Indian Band	Lillooet Tribal Council	St'at'imc	Fountain/Lillooet	traditional village Cacli'p or Xaxli'p; Full list of all Xaxli'p (Fountain) reserves	
Fountain 1B	Fountain Indian Band	Lillooet Tribal Council	St'at'imc	Fountain/Lillooet	traditional village Cacli'p or Xaxli'p; Full list of all Xaxli'p (Fountain) reserves	
Fountain 1C	Fountain Indian Band	Lillooet Tribal Council	St'at'imc	Fountain/Lillooet	traditional village Cacli'p or Xaxli'p; Full list of all Xaxli'p (Fountain) reserves	
Fountain 1D	Fountain Indian Band	Lillooet Tribal Council	St'at'imc	Fountain/Lillooet	traditional village Cacli'p or Xaxli'p; Full list of all Xaxli'p (Fountain) reserves	
Fountain 2	Fountain Indian Band	Lillooet Tribal Council	St'at'imc	Fountain/Lillooet	traditional village Cacli'p or Xaxli'p; Full list of all Xaxli'p (Fountain) reserves	
Fountain 3	Fountain Indian Band	Lillooet Tribal Council	St'at'imc	Fountain/Lillooet	traditional village Cacli'p or Xaxli'p; Full list of all Xaxli'p (Fountain) reserves	
Fountain 3A	Fountain Indian Band	Lillooet Tribal Council	St'at'imc	Fountain/Lillooet	traditional village Cacli'p or Xaxli'p; Full list of all Xaxli'p (Fountain) reserves	
Fountain 4	Fountain Indian Band	Lillooet Tribal Council	St'at'imc	Fountain Valley/Lillooet Country	Full list of all Xaxli'p (Fountain) reserves	
Fountain 9	Fountain Indian Band	Lillooet Tribal Council	St'at'imc	Fountain/Lillooet	traditional village Cacli'p or Xaxli'p; Full list of all Xaxli'p (Fountain) reserves	
Fountain 10	Fountain Indian Band	Lillooet Tribal Council	St'at'imc	Fountain/Lillooet	traditional village Cacli'p or Xaxli'p; Full list of all Xaxli'p (Fountain) reserves	
Fountain 11	Fountain Indian Band	Lillooet Tribal Council	St'at'imc	Fountain/Lillooet	traditional village Cacli'p or Xaxli'p; Full list of all Xaxli'p (Fountain) reserves	
Fountain 12	Fountain Indian Band	Lillooet Tribal Council	St'at'imc	Fountain Valley/Lillooet Country	Full list of all Xaxli'p (Fountain) reserves	
Fountain Creek 8	Fountain Indian Band	Lillooet Tribal Council	St'at'imc	Fountain Valley/Lillooet Country	Full list of all Xaxli'p (Fountain) reserves	
Fraser Island 6	Beecher Bay First Nation		Coast Salish	near Metchosin/Sooke	Complete list of Beecher Bay reserves	
Fulford Harbour 5	Tsawout First Nation		Coast Salish	Fulford Harbour, Saltspring Island	Complete list of Tsawout reserves	
Gitanmaax 1		Hereditary Chiefs of the Gitxsan	Gitxsan	Hazelton		
Gitanyow 1			Gitxsan			
Gitsegukla 1			Gitxsan	Gitsegucla		
Gitwangak 1			Gitxsan	Kitwanga		
Gitwinksihlkhw 7						
Goldstream 3	Pauquachin First Nation		Coast Salish	mouth of Goldstream River, head of Finlayson Arm (Saanich Inlet)	Complete list of Pauquachin reserves	
Goldstream 13	Tsawout First Nation		Coast Salish	south end of Finlayson Arm, Saanich Inlet, at mouth of Goldstream River	Complete list of Tsawout reserves	
Gordon River 2						
Grass 15	see comments		Sto:lo	3.5 miles SE of Chilliwack	Complete list of bands on this reserve (9 in total)	
Grassy Island 7	Ehattesaht First Nation	Nuu-chah-nulth Tribal Council	Nuu-chah-nulth	Grassy Island, south side of entrance to Kyuquot Sound	Complete list of Ehattasaht reserves	
Greenwood Island 3	Chawathil First Nation	Stó:lō Tribal Council	Sto:lo	(near Hope)	Complete list of Chawathil reserves	
Gwayasdums 1						
Hagwilget 1	Hagwilget Village Council	Hereditary Chiefs of the Wet'suwet'en		Hagwilget		
Halalt 2	Halalt First Nation	Naut'sa mawt Tribal Council	Coast Salish			
Halfway River 168						
Hanatsa 6						
Hatch Point 12	Pauquachin First Nation		Coast Salish	west shore of Saanich Inlet	Complete list of Pauquachin reserves	
Hecate 17	Ehattesaht First Nation	Nuu-chah-nulth Tribal Council	Nuu-chah-nulth	east shore of Esperanza Inlet	Complete list of Ehattasaht reserves	
Hesquis 10A	Ehattesaht First Nation	Nuu-chah-nulth Tribal Council	Nuu-chah-nulth	Graveyard Bay, north shore of Experanza Inlet	Complete list of Ehattasaht reserves	
High Bar 1	High Bar First Nation	N/A	Secwepemc	High Bar (60 km N of Lillooet)		
Hoke Point 10B	Ehattesaht First Nation	Nuu-chah-nulth Tribal Council	Nuu-chah-nulth	W shore of Graveyard Bay, N shore of Experanza Inlet	Complete list of Ehattasaht reserves	
Homalco 9	Homalco First Nation	Naut'sa mawt Tribal Council	Mainland Comox			
Hope Island 1				Hope Island		
Hopetown 10A			Kwakwaka'wakw			
Houpsitas 6						
Inklyuhkinatko 2						
Iskut 6	Iskut First Nation	Tahltan Nation	Tahltan			
Ittatsoo 1						
James Louie 3A	Williams Lake First Nation	Northern Shuswap Tribal Council	Secwepemc	4 miles N of 150 Mile House, adjoining Five Mile IR 3	Complete list of Williams Lake reserves	
Jennings River 8	Taku River Tlingit	Daak Ka Tlingit Nation	Inland Tlingit	E shore Teslin Lake at mouth of Jennings River	Complete list of Taku River Tlingit reserves	
Kahmoose 4	Boothroyd First Nation	Fraser Thompson Indian Services Society	Nlaka'pamux	1.4 mile north of mouth of Jamies Creek onto Fraser River (near Boothroyd (Fraser Canyon))		
Kamloops 1	Kamloops Indian Band	Shuswap Nation Tribal Council	Secwepemc	Kamloops		
Kanaka Bar 1A	Kanaka Bar First Nation	Fraser Canyon Indian Administration	Nlaka'pamux	Kanaka Bar		
Kanaka Bar 2	Kanaka Bar First Nation	Fraser Canyon Indian Administration	Nlaka'pamux	Kanaka Bar		
Katit 1						
Katzie 1	Katzie First Nation		Katzie/Sto:lo	Pitt Meadows		
Kawkawa Lake 16	Union Bar First Nation	N/A	Sto:lo	SE shore of Kawkawa Lake, Hope	Complete list of Union Bar reserves	
Keremeos Forkst 12 & 12A	Lower Similkameen Indian Band	Okanagan Nation Alliance	Syilx	6-7 miles north of Keremeos	Full list of Lower Similkameen reserves	
Kincolith 14	Gingolx	Nisga'a Lisims (non-TC)	Nisga'a	Gingolx		
Kippase 2						
Kispiox 1						
Kitamaat 2	Haisla Nation		Haisla	Kitimat		525
Kitasoo 1	Kitasoo First Nation	Kitasoo/Xai’Xais Nation	Kitasoo/Xai’Xais	Klemtu, British Columbia		
Kitlope Indian Reserve No. 16	Henaksiala or Kitlope or Gitlope group of the Haisla			at the mouth of the Kitlope River, south of Kitimat		
Kitsumkaylum 1			Gitxsan			
Klaklacum 12	Union Bar First Nation	N/A	Sto:lo	on the Fraser River, 3 miles N of Hope	Complete list of Union Bar reserves	
Klitsis 16	Ehattesaht First Nation	Nuu-chah-nulth Tribal Council	Nuu-chah-nulth	east shore of Espinosa Arm, Esperanza Inlet	Complete list of Ehattasaht reserves	
Kluskus 1			Dakelh			
Kootenay 1			Ktunaxa			
Kopchitchin 2						
Kulkaya (Hartley Bay) 4	Gitga'at First Nation	n/a	Gitga'ata (Tsimshian)	Hartley Bay, Wright Sound, North Coast		
Kulkaya (Hartley Bay) 4A		n/a	Gitga'ata (Tsimshian)	Hartley Bay, Wright Sound, North Coast		
Kulspai 6						
Kumcheen 1	Lytton First Nation	N/A	Nlaka'pamux	Lytton	see Camchin	
Kuper Island 7			Penelakut			
Kwawkwawapilt 6	Kwaw-kwaw-Apilt First Nation	Sto:lo Tribal Council	Sto:lo	1 mile SW of Chilliwack	Complete list of Kwaw-kwaw-Apilt reserves	
Lachkaltsap 9						
Lakahahmnen 11	Leq' a: mel First Nation		Sto:lo	Nicomen Island		
Lamb Island 5	Beecher Bay First Nation		Coast Salish	near Metchosin/Sooke	Complete list of Beecher Bay reserves	
Langley 2	Kwantlen First Nation	Sto:lo Tribal Council	Sto:lo	right bank of Stave River, 1 mile N of Fraser River (Ruskin	Complete list of all Kwantlen reserves	
Langley 3	Kwantlen First Nation	Sto:lo Tribal Council	Sto:lo	island a mouth of Stave River at Fraser River (Ruskin	Complete list of all Kwantlen reserves	
Langley 4	Kwantlen First Nation	Sto:lo Tribal Council	Sto:lo	left bank of mouth of Stave River at Fraser River (Ruskin	Complete list of all Kwantlen reserves	
Langley 5	Kwantlen First Nation	Sto:lo Tribal Council	Sto:lo	right (north) bank of Fraser River, 2 miles NE of Fort Langley (Albion	Complete list of all Kwantlen reserves	
Lax Kw'alaams 1			Tsimshian			
Liard River 3						
Lillooet 1	T'it'q'et First Nation (Lillooet Indian Band)	Lillooet Tribal Council	St'at'imc	Lillooet		
Long Neck Island 9	Beecher Bay First Nation		Coast Salish	near Metchosin/Sooke	Complete list of Beecher Bay reserves	
Lower Similkameen 2	Lower Similkameen Indian Band	Okanagan Nation Alliance	Syilx	near Cawston	Full list of Lower Similkameen reserves	
Lulu 5	Upper Similkameen First Nation	Okanagan Nation Alliance	Okanagan	13 miles east of Princeton	Complete list of Upper Similkameen reserves	
Lyacksun 3	Lyackson First Nation	Naut'sa mawt Tribal Council	Coast Salish	Valdes Island (near Chemainus)	Complete list of Lyackson reserves	
McKillan Island 6	Kwantlen First Nation	Sto:lo Tribal Council	Sto:lo	McMillan Island (Fort Langley	Complete list of all Kwantlen reserves	
McDonald Lake 1	Taku River Tlingit	Daak Ka Tlingit Nation	Inland Tlingit	at N end of McDonald Lake, 12 miles NE of Atlin	Complete list of Taku River Tlingit reserves	
Macoah 1						
Malachan 11						
Malahat 11	Malahat First Nation	Naut'sa mawt Tribal Council	Coast Salish	Malahat		
Mahmalillikullah 7	Mamalilikulla-Qwe'Qwa'Sot'Em First Nation	Kwakiutl District Council	Kwakwaka'wakw	west end of Village Island and three islands offshore there	Complete list of Mamalilikulla-Qwe'Qwa'Sot'Em reserves	
Marktosis 15			Nuu-chah-nulth			
Masset 1	Masset Indian Band (Old Masset Village Council)	Haida Nation	Haida	Masset	"Old Masset"	
Matsqui Main 2						
McLeod Lake 1	McLeod Lake First Nation			McLeod Lake		
McMillan Island 6	Kwantlen Nation		Sto:lo	Fort Langley		
Mission 1	Squamish Nation	N/A	Squamish	North Vancouver	see Esla7an	
Mount Currie 6	Mount Currie Indian Band	Lillooet Tribal Council	Lil'wat (St'at'imc)	Mount Currie-Pemberton		
Musqueam 2						
Nak'azdli						
Nanaimo Town 1						
Nanoose Indian Reserve 0	Nanoose First Nation	Naut'sa mawt Tribal Council				
Narcisse's Farm 4	Lower Similkameen Indian Band	Okanagan Nation Alliance	Syilx	near Cawston	Full list of Lower Similkameen reserves	
Nautley (Fort Fraser) 1			Dakelh	Fort Fraser		
Nazco 20	Nazko First Nation		Dakelh	Nazko		
Nequatque 2	N'Quatqua First Nation (Anderson Lake Indian Band)	Lower Stl'atl'imx Tribal Council	St'at'imc	D'Arcy (Anderson Lake)	traditional village N'Quatqua	
Neskonlith 1						
New Aiyansh 1		Nisga'a Lisims (non-TC)	Nisga'a			
New Songhees 1a	Songhees First Nation		Lekwungen/Songish, Coast Salish	Esquimalt (formerly in Victoria)	The original Songhees reserve was on Victoria's Inner Harbour, the land-allotment moved to Esquimalt in recent years	
Shingle Point 4	Lyackson First Nation	Naut'sa mawt Tribal Council	Coast Salish	Valdes Island (near Chemainus)	Complete list of Lyackson reserves	
Nicola Hamlet 1		Nicola Tribal Association				
Nicomen 1						
Nine Mile 4	Upper Similkameen First Nation	Okanagan Nation Alliance	Okanagan	on left bank of the Similkameen River	Complete list of Upper Similkameen reserves	
Nooaitch 10						
North Tacla Lake 7						
North Thompson 1	Simpcw	Shuswap Nation Tribal Council	Secwepemc	Chu Chua, N of Barriere		724
Nuuautin 2						
Oclucje 7						
Ohamil 1			Sto:lo	Chilliwack		
Okanagan 1	Okanagan Indian Band	Okanagan Nation Alliance	Okanagan	Vernon		
Oke 10	Ehattesaht First Nation	Nuu-chah-nulth Tribal Council	Nuu-chah-nulth	between Zeballos and Espinosa Arms, Esperanza Inlet	Complete list of Ehattasaht reserves	
One Mile 6	Upper Similkameen First Nation	Okanagan Nation Alliance	Okanagan	10 miles north of Princeton	Complete list of Upper Similkameen reserves	
Opitsat 1			Nuu-chah-nulth	Opitsaht (Tofino)		
Oregon Jack Creek 3	Oregon Jack Creek Indian Band	Nlaka'pamux Nation Tribal Council	Nlaka'pamux	Ashcroft		
Osoyoos 1	Osoyoos Indian Band	Okanagan Nation Alliance	Okanagan	Osoyoos & Oliver	widely leased for vineyards (40% of all grapes in the Okanagan)	
Palling 1	Wet'suwet'en First Nation (Broman Lake Band)	Hereditary Chiefs of the Wet'suwet'en (non-TC)				
Papsilqua 13	Shackan First Nation	Nicola Tribal Association	Sxe'xn'x (Nlaka'pamux)	on banks of Papsilaqu and Skuhun Creeks, in lower Nicola River valley SE of Spences Bridge	Complete list of Shackan reserves	
Pavilion 1	Pavilion Indian Band (Ts'kwaylaxw First Nation)	Lillooet Tribal Council/Shuswap Nation Tribal Council	St'at'imc & Secwepemc	Pavilion, British Columbia		
Pekw'Xwe:yles (Peckquaylis)	see comments		Sto:lo/Sts'Ailes	Hatzic/Mission	Complete list of bands on this reserve (21 in total); formerly St. Mary's Indian Residential School	
Pender Island 8	Tsawout First Nation		Coast Salish	Hay Point, west side of South Pender Island	Complete list of Tsawout reserves	
Penticton 1	Penticton Indian Band	Okanagan Nation Alliance	Okanagan	Penticton		
Peters 1	Peters Indian Band		Sto:lo	on left bank of Fraser River, 2.5 miles downstream from Laidlaw (near Hope)	Complete list of Peters reserves	
Peters 1A	Peters Indian Band		Sto:lo	on left bank of Fraser River, opposite the north end of Sea Bird Island	Complete list of Peters reserves	
Peters 2	Peters Indian Band		Sto:lo	west half of Wadsworth Island in the Fraser River, just NE of Sea Bird Island (near Ruby Creek	Complete list of Peters reserves	
Popkum 1	Popkum First Nation	Sto:lo Nation	Sto:lo	Popkum	Complete list of Popkum reserves	
Popkum 2	Popkum First Nation	Sto:lo Nation	Sto:lo	Popkum	Complete list of Popkum reserves	
Portier Pass 5	Lyackson First Nation	Naut'sa mawt Tribal Council	Coast Salish	Valdes Island (near Chemainus)	Complete list of Lyackson reserves	
Prophet River 4	Prophet River First Nation		Treaty 8 Tribal Association	Mile Post 234, Prophet River Settlement (Fort Nelson region)	sole reserve of this First Nation	
Puckatholetchin 11	Union Bar First Nation	N/A	Sto:lo	right bank of Fraser River, 4 miles north of Hope	Complete list of Union Bar reserves	
Quaaout 1						
Quaee 7						
Qualicum	Qualicum First Nation			Qualicum		
Quatlenemo 5	Fountain Indian Band	Lillooet Tribal Council	St'at'imc	Fountain Valley/Lillooet Country	Full list of all Xaxli'p (Fountain) reserves	
Quatsino Subdivision 18	Quatsino First Nation	Kwakiutl District Council	Kwakwaka'wakw	Quatsino Sound		
Quesnel 1						
Quinsam 12	Campbell River Indian Band	Kwakiutl District Council	Weywakum Laich-kwil-tach (Kwakwaka'wakw)	Campbell River		
Range 13	Lower Similkameen Indian Band	Okanagan Nation Alliance	Syilx	near Cawston	Full list of Lower Similkameen reserves	
Redstone Flat 1		Tsilhqot'in National Government	Tsi Del Del (Tsilhqot'in00)	Redstone (Hanceville)		
Refuge Cove 6						
Ruby Creek 2	Ruby Creek First Nation		Sto:lo	Agassiz		
Tatchu 13	Ehattesaht First Nation	Nuu-chah-nulth Tribal Council	Nuu-chah-nulth	on Tatchu Point, west entrance to Esperanza Inlet	Complete list of Ehattasaht reserves	
Tatchu 13A	Ehattesaht First Nation	Nuu-chah-nulth Tribal Council	Nuu-chah-nulth	on Tatchu Point, west entrance to Esperanza Inlet	Complete list of Ehattasaht reserves	
S1/2 Tsimpsean 2			Tsimshian			
Saaiyouck 6						
Sachteen 2						
Sahhaltkum 4						
St. Mary's 1A	see comments	Shuswap Nation Tribal Council/Ktunaxa Kinbasket Tribal Council	Secwepemc	at St. Eugene Mission, 6 miles north of Cranbrook	Complete list of First Nations on this reserve	
San Jose 6	Williams Lake First Nation	Northern Shuswap Tribal Council	Secwepemc	at west end (outlet) of Williams Lake (the lake)	Complete list of Williams Lake reserves	
Saturna Island 7	Tsawout First Nation		Coast Salish	east point of Saturna Island at entrance to Strait of Georgia	Complete list of Tsawout reserves	
Schelowat 1	Skwah First Nation		Sto:lo	5 miles east of Chilliwack	Complete list of all Skwah reserves	
Schkam 2	Chawathil First Nation	Stó:lō Tribal Council	Sto:lo	Haig (near Hope)	Complete list of Chawathil reserves	
Seabird Island	Seabird Island First Nation		Sto:lo	Agassiz		
Sechelt Band Lands (Sechelt) 2					see Sechelt Indian Band	
Semiahmoo Indian Reserve	Semiahmoo First Nation	N/A	Semiahmoo people	White Rock		
Shackan 11	Shackan First Nation	Nicola Tribal Association	Sxe'xn'x (Nlaka'pamux)	on Nicola River 12 miles from confluence with the Thompson	Complete list of Shackan reserves	
Shingle Point 4	Lyackson First Nation	Naut'sa mawt Tribal Council	Coast Salish	Valdes Island (near Chemainus)	Complete list of Lyackson reserves	
Shuswap Indian Reserve	Shuswap Indian Band	Shuswap Nation Tribal Council/Ktunaxa Kinbasket Tribal Council	Secwepemc	Invermere	Complete list of Shuswap Indian Band reserves (2 only)	
Sik-e-dakh 2						
Silver Salmon Lake 7	Taku River Tlingit	Daak Ka Tlingit Nation	Inland Tlingit	on Silver Salmon River at east end of Kuthai Lake, E of S end of Atlin Lake	Complete list of Taku River Tlingit reserves	
Sim Creek 5						
Siska Flat 3	Siska Indian Band		Nlaka'pamux	Siska		
Skahwalum 10	Union Bar First Nation	N/A	Sto:lo	on the right bank of the Fraser River, 5 miles N of Hope	Complete list of Union Bar reserves	
Skedans 8	[	Council of the Haida Nation	Haida	Skedans		
Skeetchestn						
Skidegate 1	Skidegate First Nation	Haida Nation	Haida	Skidegate		
Skins Lake 16a						
Skookumchuck 4	Skatin First Nation	In-SHUCK-ch Nation/Lower Stl'atl'imx Tribal Council	Stl'atl'imx	Skookumchuck Hot Springs		
Skowkale 10	Skowkale First Nation		Sto:lo	Chilliwack		
Skumalasph 16	Skwah First Nation		Sto:lo	6 miles NW of Chilliwack	Complete list of all bands on this reserve (5 in total)	
Skwah 4	Skwah First Nation	N/A	Sto:lo	west of and adjoining Chilliwack	Complete list of all Skwah reserves	
Skwahla 2	Skwah First Nation	N/A	Sto:lo	1 mile NE of Chilliwack	Complete list of all Skwah reserves	
Skwali 3	Skwah First Nation	N/A	Sto:lo	NW of and at Chilliwack	Complete list of all Skwah reserves	
Skway 5	Skway First Nation		Sto:lo	2 miles NW of Chilliwack	Complete list of Skway reserves	
Sliammon 1	Sliammon First Nation		Mainland Comox	Powell River		
Slosh 1	Seton Lake Indian Band	Lillooet Tribal Council	St'at'imc	Shalalth		
Soldatquo 5	Shackan First Nation	Nicola Tribal Association	Sxe'xn'x (Nlaka'pamux)	3 miles NE of Clapperton (near Nicola Lake	Complete list of Shackan reserves	
Soowahlie 14			Sto:lo			
South Saanich 1						
Spuzzum 1	Spuzzum First Nation	Fraser Canyon Indian Administration	Nlaka'pamux	Spuzzum		
Squawkum Creek 3						
Squiaala 7						
Squinas 2						
Stellaquo (Stella) 1	Stellat'en First Nation					
Stone 1		Tsilhqot'in National Government	Tsilhqot'in			
Stony Creek 1						
Swahliseah 14	Union Bar First Nation	N/A	Sto:lo	on the Fraser River, 1/2 M south of CN Trafalgar Stn (N of Hope)	Complete list of Union Bar reserves	
Tache 1			Dakelh			
Taku 6	Taku River Tlingit	Daak Ka Tlingit Nation	Inland Tlingit	at jct of Silver Salmon and Nakina Rivers, E of S end of Atlin Lake	Complete list of Taku River Tlingit reserves	
Telegraph Creek 6	Tahltan First Nation	Tahltan Nation	Tahltan	Telegraph Creek		
Teslin Lake 7	Taku River Tlingit	Daak Ka Tlingit Nation	Inland Tlingit	at S end of Teslin Lake, west shore, north of Hudson's Bay Post	Complete list of Taku River Tlingit reserves	
Teslin Lake 9	Taku River Tlingit	Daak Ka Tlingit Nation	Inland Tlingit	on W shore of Teslin Lake, at mouth of Gladys River	Complete list of Taku River Tlingit reserves	
Tillion 4	Williams Lake First Nation	Northern Shuswap Tribal Council	Secwepemc	left bank of Frser River at mouth of Williams Lake River	Complete list of Williams Lake reserves	
Tipella 7	Douglas Indian Band	In-SHUCK-ch Nation/Lower Stl'atl'imx Tribal Council/Sto:lo Nation	Stl'atl'imx	Port Douglas		
Tobacco Plains 2	Tobacco Plains First Nation	Ktunaxa Kinbasket Tribal Council	Ktunaxa	Roosvile (nr Cranbrook)		
Toosey 1	Toosey First Nation	Tsilhqot'in National Government	Tsilhqot'in			
Tork 7	Klahoose First Nation	Naut'sa mawt Tribal Council	Comox (Coast Salish)	E shore of Squirrel Cove, Cortes Island		
Trafalgar Flat 13	Union Bar First Nation	N/A	Sto:lo	left bank of the Fraser River, 2.5 miles N of Hope	Complete list of Union Bar reserves	
Tsahaheh 1	Tseshaht First Nation	Nuu-chah-nulth Tribal Council	Nuu-chah-nulth	Alberni Valley (Somass River)	Complete list of Tseshaht Indian Reserves	
Tsawwassen Indian Reserve	Tsawwassen First Nation	Naut'sa mawt Tribal Council	Coast Salish	Tsawwassen (Delta)	extinguished April 3, 2009 by consequence of the Tsawwassen Treaty	
Tseatah 2	Cheam First Nation	Sto:lo Tribal Council	Sto:lo	2 miles S of Agassiz (Rosedale)	Complete list of all Cheam reserves	
Tsinstikeptum 9	Westbank First Nation	Okanagan Nation Alliance	Okanagan	West Kelowna	6 miles SW of Kelowna on opposite side of Okanagan Lake	
Tsinstikeptum 10	Westbank First Nation	Okanagan Nation Alliance	Okanagan	West Kelowna	Commonly referred to as the Westbank Indian Reserve, located immediately opposite Kelowna, across Okanagan Lake	
T'sou-ke Indian Reserve 1	T'sou-ke First Nation	Naut'sa mawt Tribal Council	Coast Salish	Sooke	formerly the Sooke Indian Reserve No. 1, name changed on April 16, 1998, to match name-change of former Sooke First Nation to current	
Tsulquate 4	Gwa'Sala-'Nakwaxda'xw First Nation	Kwakiutl District Council	Kwakwaka'wakw	W shore Hardy Bay, 1 miles N of Port Hardy	Complete list of Gwa'Sala-Nakwaxda'xw reserves	
Twin Island 10	Beecher Bay First Nation		Coast Salish	near Metchosin/Sooke	Complete list of Beecher Bay reserves	
Tunnel 6	Chawathil First Nation	Stó:lō Tribal Council	Sto:lo	near Yale)	Complete list of Chawathil reserves	
Tzeachten 13			Sto:lo			
Uncha Lake 13a						
Union Bay 4			Coast Salish	Union Bay		
Unnamed 10	Taku River Tlingit	Daak Ka Tlingit Nation	Inland Tlingit	Atlin	Complete list of Taku River Tlingit reserves	
Upper Sumas 6	Sumas First Nation		Sto:lo	Kilgard (Abbotsford)	see Louie Sam	
Vermilion Forks 1	Upper Similkameen First Nation	Okanagan Nation Alliance	Okanagan	Princeton	Complete list of Upper Similkameen reserves	
Village Island 7	Beecher Bay First Nation		Coast Salish	near Metchosin/Sooke	Complete list of Beecher Bay reserves	
West Moberly Lake 168a						
Whale Island 8	Beecher Bay First Nation		Coast Salish	near Metchosin/Sooke	Complete list of Beecher Bay reserves	
Whispering Pines 4	Whispering Pines First Nation	Shuswap Nation Tribal Council	Secwepemc	Clinton		
Whonnock 1	Kwantlen First Nation	Sto:lo Tribal Council	Sto:lo	1 mile E of Whonnock	Complete list of all Kwantlen reserves	
Williams Lake 1	Williams Lake Indian Band	Northern Shuswap Tribal Council	Secwepemc	Williams Lake	aka "Sugarcane Reserve"	
Witset	Witset First Nation	Hereditary Chiefs of the Wet'suwet'en (non-TC)	Wet'suwet'en	Witset, British Columbia		
Wolf Creek 3	Upper Similkameen First Nation	Okanagan Nation Alliance	Okanagan	9 miles east of Princeton	Complete list of Upper Similkameen reserves	
Woyenne 27			Dakelh			
Yakweakwio0se 12	Yakweakwioose First Nation	Sto:lo Nation	Sto:lo	south of Chilliwack	Complete list of Yakweawioose reserves	
Yale Town 1	Yale First Nation		Sto:lo	Yale		
Ye Koo Che 3	Yekooche First Nation		Dakelh			

== Unincorporated communities ==
=== Communities ===
A community in British Columbia is an "unincorporated populated place". British Columbia has 889 communities, some of which are located within municipalities or Indian reserves.

- 108 Mile Ranch
- 141 Mile House
- 150 Mile House
- 70 Mile House
- 93 Mile
- Abbotsford (former Village of Abbotsford, now within the City of Abbotsford)
- Aberdeen (within the City of Abbotsford)
- Aberdeen (within the City of Kamloops)
- Adams Lake
- Agassiz (within the District of Kent)
- Ainsworth Hot Springs
- Alberni (within the City of Port Alberni)
- Albert Head (within the District of Metchosin)
- Albion (within the District of Maple Ridge)
- Aldergrove (within Township of Langley)
- Alexandria
- Alexis Creek
- Aleza Lake
- Alkali Lake
- Almond Gardens
- Alpine Meadows (within the Resort Municipality of Whistler)
- Altamont
- Altona
- Ambleside
- Anahim Lake
- Anglemont
- Anniedale (within City of Surrey)
- Annis
- Appledale
- Arbutus Ridge (within the City of Vancouver)
- Argenta
- Arnold (within the cities of Abbotsford and Chilliwack)
- Arras
- Arrow Creek
- Arrowview Heights
- Ashton Creek
- Atchelitz (within the City of Chilliwack)
- Athalmer
- Atlin
- Atluck
- Austin Heights (within the City of Coquitlam)
- Australian
- Avola
- Azu Ski Village
- Baldonnel
- Baldy Hughes
- Balfour
- Balmoral
- Balmoral Beach
- Bamfield
- Bankeir
- Barkerville
- Barlow Creek
- Barnet (within the City of Port Moody)
- Barnhartvale (within the City of Kamloops)
- Barnston Island
- Barrett Lake
- Barrowtown (within the City of Abbotsford)
- Batchelor Hills (within the City of Kamloops)
- Baynes Lake
- Beach Grove (within the Corporation of Delta)
- Beachcomber Bay (within the City of Vernon)
- Bear Lake
- Bear Lake
- Beaver Cove
- Beaver Creek
- Beaver Falls
- Beaver Lake (within the District of Saanich)
- Beaver Point
- Beaverdell
- Beaverley
- Bella Bella
- Bella Coola
- Belmont Park (within the City of Colwood)
- Benvoulin (within the City of Kelowna)
- Bestwick
- Big Bar Creek
- Big Eddy
- Birch Island
- Birchland Manor (within the City of Port Coquitlam)
- Black Creek
- Black Pines
- Blackpool
- Blaeberry
- Blewett
- Blind Bay
- Blind Channel
- Blubber Bay
- Blucher Hall
- Blue River
- Blueberry Creek
- Blueridge (within the District of North Vancouver)
- Bonnet Hill (within the City of Prince George)
- Bonnington Falls
- Boothroyd
- Boston Bar
- Boswell
- Bouchie Lake
- Boundary Bay (within the Corporation of Delta)
- Bowser
- Brackendale (within the District of Squamish)
- Bradner (within the City of Abbotsford)
- Braemar Heights (within the City of Colwood)
- Braeside
- Brandon
- Brentwood Bay
- Brentwood Park (within the City of Burnaby)
- Brew Bay
- Bridal Falls
- Bridesville
- Bridge Lake
- Bridgeview (within City of Surrey)
- Brigade Lake
- Brighouse (within the City of Richmond)
- Brilliant
- Brisco
- Britannia Beach
- British Properties (within the District of West Vancouver)
- Broadmoor (within the City of Richmond)
- Broadview (within the City of Salmon Arm)
- Brocklehurst (within the City of Kamloops)
- Brookswood (within Township of Langley)
- Brouse
- Brunette Creek (within the City of New Westminster)
- Buckhorn
- Buckingham Heights (within the City of Burnaby)
- Buckinghorse River
- Buckley Bay
- Buffalo Creek
- Buick
- Burkeville (within the City of Richmond)
- Burnaby Heights (within the City of Burnaby)
- Burquitlam (within the City of Coquitlam)
- Burton
- Cadboro Bay (within the District of Saanich)
- Caithness
- Cameron Heights (within the City of Port Alberni)
- Campbell Island
- Campbellton
- Canim Lake
- Canoe (within the City of Salmon Arm)
- Canyon
- Canyon Alpine
- Canyon Heights (within the District of North Vancouver)
- Capilano Highlands (within the District of North Vancouver)
- Capitol Hill (within the City of Burnaby)
- Cariboo (within the City of Coquitlam)
- Carrs (within the District of Lake Country)
- Cascade Heights (within the City of Burnaby)
- Casino
- Cassidy
- Cassin (within the City of Coquitlam)
- Castle Rock
- Castledale
- Caulfeild
- Cawston
- Caycuse
- Cecil Lake
- Cedar
- Cedar Grove
- Cedardale (within the District of West Vancouver)
- Cedarside
- Cedarvale
- Celista
- Chapman Camp
- Charella Garden (within the City of Prince George)
- Charlie Lake
- Chase River (within the City of Nanaimo)
- Cheakamus (within the District of Squamish)
- Chemainus (within the Municipality of North Cowichan)
- Cherry Creek
- Cherry Creek
- Cherryville
- Chezacut
- Chilanko Forks
- Chilcotin Forest
- Chineside (within the City of Coquitlam)
- Christina Lake
- Cinnabar Valley
- Clairmont
- Claybrick
- Clayburn (within the City of Abbotsford)
- Clayhurst
- Clearbrook (within the City of Abbotsford)
- Cleveland Park (within the District of North Vancouver)
- Coal Harbour
- Coalmont
- Cobble Hill
- College Heights (within the City of Prince George)
- Collettville
- Colquitz (within the District of Saanich)
- Columbia Gardens
- Commodore Heights
- Connaught Heights (within the City of New Westminster)
- Coombe
- Coombs
- Cooper Creek
- Cordova Bay (within the District of Saanich)
- Cortes Bay
- Cove Cliff
- Cowichan Bay
- Cowichan Station
- Coyle
- Craigellachie
- Cranberry
- Cranberry Junction
- Crawford Bay
- Creighton Valley
- Crescent (within City of Surrey)
- Crescent Bay
- Crescent Beach (within City of Surrey)
- Crescent Beach
- Crescent Valley
- Crofton (within the Municipality of North Cowichan)
- Cultus Lake
- Cypress Park (within the District of West Vancouver)
- Dallas (within the City of Kamloops)
- D'Arcy
- Darfield
- Dartmoor (within the City of Coquitlam)
- Dashwood
- Davis Bay
- Dease Lake
- Decker Lake
- Deep Bay
- Deep Cove (within the District of North Saanich)
- Deep Cove (within the District of North Vancouver)
- Delbrook (in the District of North Vancouver)
- Delkatla
- Denman Island
- Dentville (within the District of Squamish)
- Departure Bay (within the City of Nanaimo)
- Deroche
- Dewdney
- Dodge Cove
- Dog Creek
- Dog Creek
- Dogwood Valley
- Doig River
- Dokie Siding
- Dollarton (within the District of North Vancouver)
- Dolphin Beach
- Dome Creek
- Donald
- Donald Landing
- Douglas (within City of Surrey)
- Douglas Lake
- Driftwood Creek
- Dry Gulch
- Duck Range
- Dufferin (within the City of Kamloops)
- Dunbar-Southlands (within the City of Vancouver)
- Dundarave (within the District of West Vancouver)
- Dunkley
- Dunster
- Durieu
- Eagle Bay
- Eagle Creek
- Eagle Harbour (within the District of West Vancouver)
- Eagle Heights
- Eagle Ridge (within the City of Coquitlam)
- Eagle Run (within the District of Squamish)
- East Kelowna (within the City of Kelowna)
- East Osoyoos (within the Town of Osoyoos)
- East Sooke
- East Trail
- East Wellington
- Eastburn (within the City of Burnaby)
- Eastgate
- Eddontenajon
- Edgewater
- Edgewood
- Egmont
- Elgin (within City of Surrey)
- Elko
- Ellison
- Elphinstone
- Endako
- Engen
- Erickson
- Errington
- Esler
- Essondale (within the City of Coquitlam)
- Extension
- Fairbridge
- Fairfield (within the City of Chilliwack)
- Fairfield
- Fairview
- Fairview (within the City of Vancouver)
- Falkland
- False Bay
- Fanny Bay
- Farmington
- Fauquier
- Fernridge (within Township of Langley)
- Ferndale
- Fernwood (located on Saltspring Island)
- Field
- Fife
- Firvale
- Flatrock
- Floods (within the District of Hope)
- Foreman
- Forest Grove
- Forest Hills (within the District of North Vancouver)
- Forest Knolls (within Township of Langley)
- Fort Babine
- Fort Fraser
- Fort Langley (within Township of Langley)
- Fort Nelson (within the Northern Rockies Regional Municipality)
- Fort Rupert
- Fort Ware
- François Lake
- Fraser
- Fraser Heights (within City of Surrey)
- Fraser Mills (within the City of Coquitlam)
- French Creek
- Fulford Harbour
- Gabriola
- Galloway
- Gambier Harbour
- Gang Ranch
- Ganges
- Garden Bay
- Garden Village (within the City of Burnaby)
- Garibaldi Estates (within the District of Squamish)
- Garnet Valley (within District of Summerland)
- Gateway
- Gellatly (within the District of West Kelowna)
- Genelle
- Germansen Landing
- Gibson Creek
- Gillies Bay
- Gilpin
- Gingolx
- Gitwinksihlkw
- Glade
- Glen Valley (within Township of Langley)
- Glen Vowell
- Glenbank
- Glenbrooke North
- Glendale
- Gleneagles (within the District of West Vancouver)
- Gleneden (within the City of Salmon Arm)
- Glenmerry (within the City of Trail)
- Glenmore (within the District of West Vancouver)
- Glenrosa (within the District of West Kelowna)
- Gold Bridge
- Goldstream (within City of Langford)
- Goodlow
- Gordon Head (within the District of Saanich)
- Grand Haven
- Grand Rapids
- Grandview (within City of Surrey)
- Grandview Bench
- Grandview-Woodlands (within the City of Vancouver)
- Granite
- Grantham
- Granthams Landing
- Gray Creek
- Greendale (within the City of Chilliwack)
- Grindrod
- Groundbirch
- Hagensborg
- Hagwilget
- Haig (within the District of Hope)
- Halfmoon Bay
- Haney (within the District of Maple Ridge)
- Happy Valley (within City of Langford)
- Harbour Chines (within the City of Coquitlam)
- Harbour Village (within the City of Coquitlam)
- Harrison Mills
- Harrogate
- Harrop
- Hart Highlands (within the City of Prince George)
- Hartley Bay
- Hasler Flat
- Hastings-Sunrise (within the City of Vancouver)
- Hatzic (within the District of Mission)
- Hazelmere (within City of Surrey)
- Hedley
- Heffley Creek
- Heriot Bay
- Hilliers
- Hills
- Hixon
- Holberg
- Hollyburn
- Honeymoon Bay
- Hopetown
- Hopkins Landing
- Hornby Island
- Horsefly
- Horseshoe Bay (within the District of West Vancouver)
- Hosmer
- Hospital Hill (within the District of Squamish)
- Huntingdon (within the City of Abbotsford)
- Hupel
- Huscroft
- Hyde Creek
- Inkaneep
- Ioco (within the City of Port Moody)
- Iskut
- Island Cache (within the City of Prince George)
- Jaffray
- James Bay
- Jeune Landing
- Johnson Heights (within City of Surrey)
- Johnsons Landing
- Juniper Ridge
- Juskatla
- Kahntah (within the Northern Rockies Regional Municipality)
- Kaleden
- Keating (within the District of Central Saanich)
- Keith-Lynn
- Kelly Lake
- Kelvin
- Kemano
- Kensington-Cedar Cottage (within the City of Vancouver)
- Kerrisdale (within the City of Vancouver)
- Kersley
- Kettle Valley
- Kilgard (within the City of Abbotsford)
- Killarney (within the City of Vancouver)
- Killiney Beach
- Kingfisher
- Kispiox
- Kitamaat Village
- Kitchener
- Kitkatla
- Kitsault
- Kitseguecla
- Kitsilano (within the City of Vancouver)
- Kitsumkalum
- Kitwanga
- Kleecoot
- Kleena Kleene
- Klemtu
- Knutsford
- Koch Siding.
- Kokish
- Koksilah
- Kootenay Bay
- Krestova
- Kuldo
- Kuskonook
- Kyuquot
- Lac la Hache
- Ladner (within the Corporation of Delta)
- Laidlaw
- Lake Errock
- Lake Hill (within the District of Saanich)
- Lakelse Lake
- Lakeview Heights (within the District of West Kelowna)
- Lamming Mills
- Lang Bay
- Langdale
- Lardeau
- Laurentian Belaire (within the City of Coquitlam)
- Lavington
- Lax Kw'alaams
- Laxgalts'ap
- Lazo
- Lebahdo
- Lee Creek
- Lemon Creek
- Leo Creek
- Lighthouse Point
- Likely
- Lincoln Park
- Lindell Beach
- Lister
- Little Fort
- Little River
- Lone Butte
- Lone Prairie
- Longbeach.
- Louis Creek
- Lower China Creek
- Lower Lonsdale
- Lower Nicola
- Lower Post
- Lund
- Lust Subdivision
- Luxton (within City of Langford)
- Lynn Valley
- Lynnmour (within the District of North Vancouver)
- Lynx Creek
- Madeira Park
- Magna Bay
- Mahatta River
- Maillardville
- Malahat
- Malakwa
- Manning Park
- Mansons Landing
- Maple Bay (within the Municipality of North Cowichan)
- Maplewood (within the District of North Vancouver)
- Mara
- Marguerite
- Marigold (within the District of Saanich)
- Marktosis
- Marpole (within the City of Vancouver)
- Martin Prairie
- Mary Hill (within the City of Port Coquitlam)
- Marysville
- Mason Creek
- Masset
- Mayfair (within the City of Coquitlam)
- Mayne Island
- Mayook
- McGregor
- McKinley Landing (within the City of Kelowna)
- McLeese Lake
- McLeod Lake
- McLure
- Meadow Creek
- Meadowbrook (within the City of Port Coquitlam)
- Merville
- Mesachie Lake
- Metlakatla
- Metrotown (within the City of Burnaby)
- Mica Creek
- Middle River
- Middlegate (within the City of Burnaby)
- Mill Bay
- Milner (within Township of Langley)
- Milnes Landing
- Minstrel Island
- Miracle Valley
- Mirror Lake
- Mission (former Town of Mission City, now within the District of Mission)
- Miworth
- Moberly Lake
- Monte Creek
- Monte Lake
- Moose Heights
- Mount Currie
- Mount Lehman (within the City of Abbotsford)
- Mount Pleasant (within the City of Vancouver)
- Mountain Station
- Moyie
- Murrayville (within Township of Langley)
- Myrtle Point
- Nanoose Bay
- Naramata
- Nass Camp
- Nazko
- New Aiyansh
- New Brighton
- New Settlement
- Nicholson
- Nicola
- Nimpkish
- Nimpo Lake
- Norgate (within the District of North Vancouver)
- North Bend
- North Bulkley
- North Campbell River
- North Delta (within the Corporation of Delta)
- North Galiano
- North Kamloops (within the City of Kamloops)
- North Lonsdale (within the City of North Vancouver)
- North Nechako (within the City of Prince George)
- North Poplar (within the City of Abbotsford)
- Northfield (within the City of Nanaimo)
- Northridge (within the District of Squamish)
- Notch Hill
- Nuchatlitz
- Nukko Lake
- Nursery
- Oak Hills (within the City of Kamloops)
- Oakridge (within the City of Vancouver)
- Oasis
- Ocean Falls
- Ocean Grove
- Ocean Park (within City of Surrey)
- Okanagan Centre (within the District of Lake Country)
- Okanagan Landing (within the City of Vernon)
- Okanagan Mission (within the City of Kelowna)
- Olalla
- Old Bella Bella
- Old Fort
- Old Fort Nelson (within the Northern Rockies Regional Municipality)
- Old Massett
- Oliver's Landing
- Ootischenia
- Opitsaht
- Osborn (within the Municipality of North Cowichan)
- Osprey Lake
- Otter Point
- Otway (within the City of Prince George)
- Oxford Heights (within the City of Port Coquitlam)
- Oyama (within the District of Lake Country)
- Oyster River
- Paldi
- Palling
- Panorama Ridge (within the City of Surrey)
- Park Royal (within the District of West Vancouver)
- Park Siding
- Parkdale Gardens (within the Corporation of Delta)
- Passmore
- Paterson
- Pavilion
- Pemberton Heights (within the District of North Vancouver)
- Pender Island
- Perow
- Perry Siding
- Phillips Arm
- Pinantan Lake
- Pine Valley
- Pineview
- Pitt Meadows
- Pixie Beach (within the District of Lake Country)
- Playmor Junction
- Pleasantside (within the City of Port Moody)
- Popkum
- Poplar Grove
- Port Essington
- Port Guichon (within the Corporation of Delta)
- Port Hammond (within the District of Maple Ridge)
- Port Kells (within the City of Surrey)
- Port Mann (within the City of Surrey)
- Port Mellon
- Port Renfrew
- Port Washington
- Powers Addition (within the City of Kamloops)
- Prairie Valley (within District of Summerland)
- Prespatou
- Pritchard
- Procter
- Progress
- Promontory (within the City of Chilliwack)
- Prospect Lake (within the District of Saanich)
- Qualicum Bay
- Quathiaski Cove
- Quatsino
- Queens Bay
- Queens Park (within the City of New Westminster)
- Queensborough (within the City of New Westminster)
- Quesnel View
- Quick
- Quinsam
- Ranch Park
- Ranchero
- Raspberry
- Rayleigh (within the City of Kamloops)
- Red Bluff
- Red Rock
- Redroofs
- Reid Lake
- Remo
- Renfrew-Collingwood (within the City of Vancouver)
- Rich Bar
- Ridgedale (within the City of Abbotsford)
- Riley Park (within the City of Vancouver)
- Riondel
- Riske Creek
- River Jordan
- River Springs
- Rivervale (within the City of Trail)
- Roberts Creek
- Robson
- Rock Creek
- Rockyview (within the City of Cranbrook)
- Rolla
- Rose Lake
- Rosedale (within the City of Chilliwack)
- Ross Spur
- Royal Oak (within the District of Saanich)
- Royston
- Rumble Beach
- Ruskin (within the District of Maple Ridge)
- Rutland (within the City of Kelowna)
- Ryder Lake (within the City of Chilliwack)
- Saanichton (within the District of Central Saanich)
- Sahali (within the City of Kamloops)
- Sahara Heights (within the City of Port Alberni)
- Sahtlam
- Salmon Arm (former Village of Salmon Arm, now within the City of Salmon Arm)
- Salmon Beach
- Salmon Valley
- Saltair
- Saltery Bay
- Sandspit
- Sandwick
- Sandy Cove (within the District of West Vancouver)
- Sapperton (within the City of Surrey)
- Saratoga Beach
- Sardis (within the City of Chilliwack)
- Saseenos
- Savona
- Scotch Creek
- Seafair (within the City of Richmond)
- Secret Cove
- Selma Park
- Sentinel Hill (within the District of West Vancouver)
- Seton Portage
- Sevenoaks (within the District of Saanich)
- Sewell Inlet
- Seymour Arm
- Seymour Heights (within the District of North Vancouver)
- Shady Valley (within the City of Prince George)
- Shalalth
- Shaughnessy (within the City of Vancouver)
- Shawnigan Lake
- Shelley
- Shelter Point
- Sheraton
- Shoreacres
- Shuswap
- Shutty Bench
- Silver Creek (within the District of Hope)
- Silver Valley (within the District of Maple Ridge)
- Silverhill (within the District of Mission)
- Sinclair Mills
- Sirdar
- Six Mile Point
- Skidegate
- Slesse Park
- Sliammon
- Slocan Park
- Soda Creek
- Sointula
- Solsqua
- Somenos (within the Municipality of North Cowichan)
- Sorrento
- South Cambie
- South Canoe (within the City of Salmon Arm)
- South Dawson
- South Fort George (within the City of Prince George)
- South Hazelton
- South Lakeside
- South Poplar (within the City of Abbotsford)
- South Shalalth
- South Slocan
- South Slope (within the City of Burnaby)
- South Sumas (within the City of Chilliwack)
- South Taylor
- South Wellington
- Southarm (within the City of Richmond)
- Southbank
- Spences Bridge
- Spillimacheen
- Springhouse
- Sproat Lake
- Squilax
- St. Eugene Mission
- St. Ives
- St. Joseph Mission
- Stave Falls (within the District of Mission)
- Steelhead (within the District of Mission)
- Stellako
- Steveston (within the City of Richmond)
- Stillwater
- Stoner
- Stories Beach
- Straiton (within the City of Abbotsford)
- Strathcona (within the City of Vancouver)
- Strathnaver
- Strawberry Hill (within the City of Surrey)
- Strawberry Vale (within the District of Saanich)
- Stuie
- Stump Lake
- Sturdies Bay
- Sugarcane
- Sullivan (within the City of Surrey)
- Sullivan Heights (within the City of Burnaby)
- Summit Lake (within the Northern Rockies Regional Municipality)
- Sun Valley (within the City of Coquitlam)
- Suncrest (within the City of Burnaby)
- Sunningdale (within the City of Trail)
- Sunnybrae
- Sunnyside
- Sunset (within the City of Vancouver)
- Sunset Beach (within the District of West Vancouver)
- Sunset Prairie
- Sunshine Bay
- Sunshine Hills (within the Corporation of Delta)
- Sunshine Valley
- Surrey Centre
- Ta Ta Creek
- Tachie
- Tadanac
- Taghum
- Tamarisk (within the Resort Municipality of Whistler)
- Tappen
- Tarrys
- Tchesinkut Lake
- Telegraph Creek
- Ten Mile Lake
- Tête Jaune Cache
- Thetis Island
- Thompson (within the City of Richmond)
- Thornhill
- Thrums
- Tillicum (within the District of Saanich)
- Tintagel
- Tlell
- Topley
- Topley Landing
- Trêpanier
- Traders Cove
- Tranquille
- Trinity Valley
- Trout Creek
- Trout Lake
- Tsawwassen
- Tsawwassen Beach (within the Corporation of Delta)
- Tulameen
- Tumbler Ridge
- Turtle Valley
- Two Mile
- Two Rivers
- Tynehead (within the City of Surrey)
- Tzouhalem (within the Municipality of North Cowichan)
- Union Bay
- University Hill
- Upper China Creek
- Upper Fraser
- Upper Halfway
- Upper Lynn (within the District of North Vancouver)
- Usk
- Valleycliffe
- Valleyview (within the City of Kamloops)
- Vallican
- Van Anda
- Vanway (within the City of Prince George)
- Vavenby
- Vedder Crossing (within the City of Chilliwack)
- Victoria-Fraserview (within the City of Vancouver)
- Vinsulla
- Walhachin
- Walnut Grove (within the Township of Langley)
- Waneta Junction (within the City of Trail)
- Wardner
- Wasa
- Websters Corners (within the District of Maple Ridge)
- Wellington (within the City of Nanaimo)
- Wells
- West Bay
- West Bench
- West End (within the City of New Westminster)
- West End (within the City of Vancouver)
- West Heights (within the District of Mission)
- West Lynn (within the District of North Vancouver)
- West Midway
- West Point Grey (within the City of Vancouver)
- West Trail (within the City of Trail)
- Westbank (within the District of West Kelowna)
- Westholme (within the Municipality of North Cowichan)
- Westmount
- Westridge (within the City of Burnaby)
- Westside
- Westsyde (within the City of Kamloops)
- Westview
- Westwold
- Wet'suwet'en Village
- Whisky Creek
- Whistler Creek (within the Resort Municipality of Whistler)
- White Lake
- Whonnock (within the District of Maple Ridge)
- Whyac
- Whytecliff (within the District of West Vancouver)
- Wildwood
- Wiley
- Williams Beach
- Willingdon Heights (within the City of Burnaby)
- Willow Point
- Willow River
- Willowbrook (within the Township of Langley)
- Wilmer
- Wilson Creek
- Windermere
- Windsor Park (within the District of North Vancouver)
- Winfield (within the District of Lake Country)
- Winlaw
- Winter Harbour
- Wonowon
- Woodhaven
- Woodlands
- Woodpecker
- Woodsdale (within the District of Lake Country)
- Woss
- Wycliffe
- Wynndel
- Yaculta
- Yahk
- Yale (within the District of North Vancouver) north
- Yarksis
- Yarrow (within the City of Chilliwack)
- Ymir
- Youbou
- Yuquot

=== Recreational communities ===
A recreational community in British Columbia is an "unincorporated place with seasonal or year-round services, accommodation and amenities associated primarily with recreational or leisure activities". British Columbia has 11 communities that are classified as recreational communities.

- Apex Mountain
- Bear Mountain
- Big White
- Blackcomb (within the Resort Municipality of Whistler)
- Fairmont Hot Springs
- Hemlock Valley
- Kicking Horse
- Mount Baldy
- Mount Washington
- North Star
- Panorama
- Silver Star
- Tobiano
- Whistler (within the Resort Municipality of Whistler)

=== Urban communities ===
An urban community in British Columbia is a "separately named area within the limits of an incorporated municipality". British Columbia has 10 communities that are classified as urban communities.

- Cloverdale (within the City of Surrey)
- Fleetwood (within the City of Surrey)
- Guildford (within the City of Surrey)
- Kinnaird (former village, now within the City of Castlegar)
- Matsqui (within the City of Abbotsford)
- Nechako (within the District Municipality of Kitimat)
- Newton (within the City of Surrey)
- South Surrey (within the City of Surrey)
- Whalley (within the City of Surrey)

== Localities ==
A locality in British Columbia is a "named place or area, with or without a scattered population". British Columbia has 556 localities, not including those that have been abandoned or are classified as former localities.

- 105 Mile House
- 111 Mile House
- 114 Mile House
- 12 Mile
- 122 Mile House
- 127 Mile House
- 40 Mile Flats
- Agate
- Ahousat
- Albas
- Albreda
- Alice Arm
- Alice Siding
- Allenby
- Allison Lake
- Alta Lake (within the Resort Municipality of Whistler)
- Alvin
- Anaconda
- Anvil Island
- Anzac
- Applegrove
- Ardmore
- Arrow Park
- Arrowhead
- Aspen Grove
- Atnarko
- Attachie
- Baker
- Baker Creek
- Bamberton
- Bastion Bay
- Bear Creek
- Bear Flat
- Beasley
- Beaton
- Beatton Ranch
- Beaver Pass House
- Becher House
- Bell II
- Bennett
- Benson Lake
- Beresford
- Beryl Prairie
- Bessborough
- Bevan
- Big Bay
- Big Creek
- Big Lake Ranch
- Billings
- Billings Bay
- Birchdale
- Birken
- Black Creek
- Blackloam
- Blackwater
- Bliss Landing
- Bloedel
- Blue Springs
- Boat Basin
- Boat Harbour
- Bob Quinn Lake
- Bold Point
- Bonaparte
- Boring Ranch
- Boston Flats
- Boulder City
- Boundary Falls
- Bowen Bay
- Brady Ranch
- Braeloch
- Bralorne
- Brem River
- Brexton
- Briar Ridge
- Broman Lake
- Brookmere
- Brunswick Beach
- Buccaneer Bay
- Bulkley House
- Bull River
- Cahilty
- Callison Ranch
- Camborne
- Camp Artaban
- Camp McKinney
- Campbell Creek
- Canford
- Canyon Hot Springs
- Carlin
- Carlson
- Carmi
- Carnaby
- Carrolls Landing
- Carson
- Cascade
- Ceepeecee
- Chamiss Bay
- Chapmans
- Charlotte Lake
- Chasm
- Chaumox
- Cheam View
- Cheekye
- Cheslatta
- Chetarpe
- Chinook Cove
- Choate
- Chopaka
- Christian Valley
- Chu Chua
- Church House
- Chute Lake
- Cinema
- Clapperton
- Clayoquot
- Clemretta
- Clo-oose
- Coal River
- Cody
- Cokato
- Coldspring House
- Colleymount
- Copper Creek
- Corbin
- Corra Linn
- Cottonwood
- Coutlee
- Cowans Point
- Cracroft
- Creekside
- Crescent Spur
- Criss Creek
- Crowsnest
- Croydon
- Cumshewa
- Curzon
- Dadens
- Danskin
- Darrell Bay
- Dawsons Landing
- Days Ranch
- Deadwood
- Deep Creek
- Deer Park
- Deerholme
- Defot
- Deka Lake
- Devine
- Doe River
- Dog Creek
- Doriston
- Dorreen
- Dugan Lake
- Duncan Bay
- Dunsmuir
- Eagle Bluff
- Earls Cove
- East Arrow Park
- East Gate
- East Pine
- Eastbourne
- Echo Bay
- Ecoole
- Eddy
- Edelweiss
- Eholt
- Ekins Point
- Elephant Crossing
- Elk Bay
- Elk Prairie
- Engineer
- Enterprise
- Erie
- Esperanza
- Estevan Point
- Exeter
- Exlou
- Fair Harbour
- Farrell Creek
- Federal Ranch
- Fellers Heights
- Ferguson
- Fifth Cabin
- Fintry
- Fireside
- Five Mile
- Flathead
- Flathead
- Fontas
- Forde
- Forestdale
- Fort Steele
- Fosthall
- Fountain
- Fountain Valley
- Fourth Cabin
- Fowler
- Furry Creek
- Galena Bay
- Garibaldi
- Gates
- Genoa Bay
- George River
- Georgetown Mills
- Gifford (within the City of Abbotsford)
- Giscome
- Gitanyow (within the Gitanyow 1 Indian Reserve)
- Glen Lake
- Glenannan
- Glenemma
- Glenlily
- Glenora
- Glentanna
- Good Hope Lake
- Gordon River
- Gramsons
- Granduc
- Granite Bay
- Grasmere
- Grassy Plains
- Great Central
- Greata
- Gundy
- Haina
- Halfway Ranch
- Hall
- Hanceville
- Hardwicke Island
- Harmac
- Headquarters
- Health Bay
- Hells Gate
- Hesquiat
- Hickethier Ranch
- Hillcrest
- Hippa
- Hiusta Meadow
- Hkusam
- Holmwood
- Homfray Creek
- Hopington
- Hot Springs Cove
- Howser
- Hullcar
- Hunts Inlet
- Hydraulic
- Hyland Post
- Hyland Ranch
- Ingenika Mine
- Irvines Landing
- Isle Pierre
- Jacksons
- Jade City
- Jellicoe
- Jersey
- Jesmond
- Jura
- Kaisun (Haida village)
- Kanaka Bar
- Keats Island
- Kedleston
- Keithley Creek
- Kelly Lake
- Kendrick Camp
- Kerr Creek
- Kildonan
- Kilkerran
- Kimsquit
- Kingcome
- Kingcome Inlet
- Kingsgate
- Kiusta
- Kleindale
- Kobes
- Kootenay Crossing
- Kragmont
- 'Ksan
- Kung
- Lac Le Jeune
- Lake Kathlyn
- Laketon
- Larsons Landing
- Lawnhill
- Leechtown
- Lees Corner
- Lejac
- Lemoray
- Lexau Ranch
- Liard River
- Lily Lake
- Lindell
- Lindeman
- Lockeport
- Longworth
- Loon Lake
- Loos
- Lucas
- Lucerne
- Lumberton
- Mabel Lake
- Macalister
- Magnum Mine
- Mahood Falls
- Makinson.
- Manson Creek
- Mapes
- Marblehead
- Marilla
- Marron Valley
- Marshall School Junction
- Matilpi
- McCulloch
- McDame
- McDonald's Landing
- McGillivray
- McGuire
- McKearney Ranch
- McLean Ranch
- McNab Creek
- Meachen
- Meadows
- Meem Quam Leese
- Meldrum Creek
- Meziadin Junction
- Mile 62 1/2
- Mill Bay
- Millstream
- Minaty Bay
- Minto Landing
- Miocene
- Mitchell Bay
- Moha
- Montney
- Morrissey
- Mount Gardner
- Mount Robson
- Mud Bay
- Mud Bay
- Mud River
- Muncho Lake
- Murdale
- Muskwa
- Myra
- Nahun
- Namu
- Narcosli Creek
- Nelson Forks
- Nelway
- Nemaiah Valley
- Nesters (within the Resort Municipality of Whistler)
- New Clew
- Newgate
- Newlands
- Niagara
- Nimpkish Heights
- Ninstints
- Noralee
- North Bonaparte
- North Pine
- Nulki
- Ogden
- Old Fort
- Old Hogem
- Old Remo
- Old Town
- Oona River
- Ootsa Lake
- Osland
- Othello
- Owen Bay
- Owl Creek
- Paradise Point
- Paradise Valley
- Parkland
- Parson
- Pass Creek
- Paulson
- Peejay
- Pemberton Meadows
- Pendleton Bay
- Penny
- Pinchi
- Pinchi Lake
- Pine Valley
- Pinegrove
- Pineview
- Pink Mountain
- Pioneer Mine
- Pleasant Camp
- Poplar Creek
- Porcher Island
- Port Albion
- Port Douglas
- Port Neville
- Porteau
- Porter Landing
- Porto Rico
- Prairiedale
- Premier
- Premier Lake
- Prophet River
- Punchaw
- Puntledge
- Quesnel Forks
- Quilchena
- Rainy Hollow
- Read Island
- Red Pass
- Red Rose
- Redstone
- Refuge Cove
- Remac
- Renata
- Retallack
- Rhone
- Robson West
- Rock Bay
- Roe Lake
- Rogers Pass
- Roosville
- Rose Harbour
- Rose Prairie
- Rosebery
- Rosswood
- Round Lake
- Round Prairie
- Roy
- Ruby Creek
- Rupert
- Rykerts
- Saloon
- Sanca
- Sandon
- Saturna
- Scotia Bay
- Scott Cove
- Seaford
- Seaside Park
- Seven Mile Corner
- Sewall
- Seymour Lake
- Shannon Bay
- Shawl Bay
- Shearer Dale
- Shearwater
- Shere
- Sheridan Lake
- Sheslay
- Shingle Creek
- Shirley
- Shoreholme
- Shulus
- Shushartie
- Shuswap
- Shuswap Falls
- Sikanni Chief
- Silica
- Silver Creek
- Silver River
- Simpson Ranch
- Sinkut River
- Skedans
- Skeena Crossing
- Skidegate Landing
- Skookumchuck
- Skookumchuck
- Smith River
- Snake River
- South Bentinck
- Spatsum
- Sproatt
- Spuzzum
- Squeah
- Squirrel Cove
- Stanley
- Steamboat
- Stewardson Inlet
- Stikine
- Stillwater
- Strachan Creek
- Streatham
- Stuart Island
- Sullivan Bay
- Summit Lake
- Summit Lake
- Sunnyside (within the City of Surrey)
- Sunrise Valley
- Surge Narrows
- Surprise
- Sweetwater
- Taft
- Tahltan
- Takla Landing
- Taku
- Takysie Lake
- Tallheo
- Tanu
- Tatalrose
- Tatla Lake
- Tatlayoko Lake
- Tatlow
- Tatogga
- Tatton
- Teakerne Arm
- Telachick
- Telegraph Cove
- Tetachuk
- Theodosia Arm
- Thompson Sound
- Three Forks
- Thurlow
- Thurston Harbour
- Tipella
- Toad River
- Toby Creek
- Tomslake
- Towdystan
- Tower Lake
- Trutch
- Tsay Keh Dene
- Tulsequah
- Tupper
- Tuwanek
- Twidwell Bend
- Twin Creeks
- Ulkatcho
- Upper Cutbank
- Valemount, British Columbia
- Valley View
- Vaucroft Beach
- Vermilion Crossing
- Vidette
- Wagner Ranch
- Warner Bay
- Weewanie
- Welcome Beach
- Weneez
- West Landing
- Westbridge
- Whaletown
- Williams Landing
- Williamsons Landing
- Willow Valley
- Willowbrook
- Willowvale
- Wilson Landing
- Wingdam
- Wistaria
- Witset
- Woodcock
- Woodfibre
- Woodmere
- Woods Landing
- Wright
- Yaku
- Yankee Flats
- Yekooche
- Yennadon
- Yreka
- Zamora
- Zincton

=== Abandoned localities ===
An abandoned locality in British Columbia is a "previously populated place with no current population; often a modern landmark in a remote location". British Columbia has 18 localities that are considered abandoned.

- Alamo
- Anyox
- Bear Camp
- Bergs
- Blakeburn
- Boswell
- Brunswick
- Cariboo Meadows
- Cassiar
- Centreville
- Copper Mountain
- Gerrard
- Hecate
- Hendrix Lake
- Margaret Bay
- Nalos Landing
- Phoenix
- Tasu

=== Former localities ===
A former locality in British Columbia is a "once-populated place with no current population or that is usually uninhabited". British Columbia recognizes eight places as former localities.

- Anderson
- Belleview
- Ben-My-Chree
- Cariboo (now Lamming Mills)
- Ehatisaht
- Franklin Camp
- San Josef (also known as San Josef Bay)

=== Landings ===
"Landings", formerly classed as "steamer landings" are found along coastal BC an on certain inland waterways and lakes. They were often associated with mining and logging camps or fish canneries, or local agricultural settlements.

- Jedway
- Kootenay Landing

== Company towns ==
Company towns were once common in British Columbia. Many were large, but never had municipal government and were largely located on company-owned land. A few such as Granisle, Tumbler Ridge and Wells became municipalities, while others have become ghost towns. Among the largest were Anyox, Bralorne, Ocean Falls, Cassiar, Gold Harbour (Tasu) and Kitsault.

== See also ==
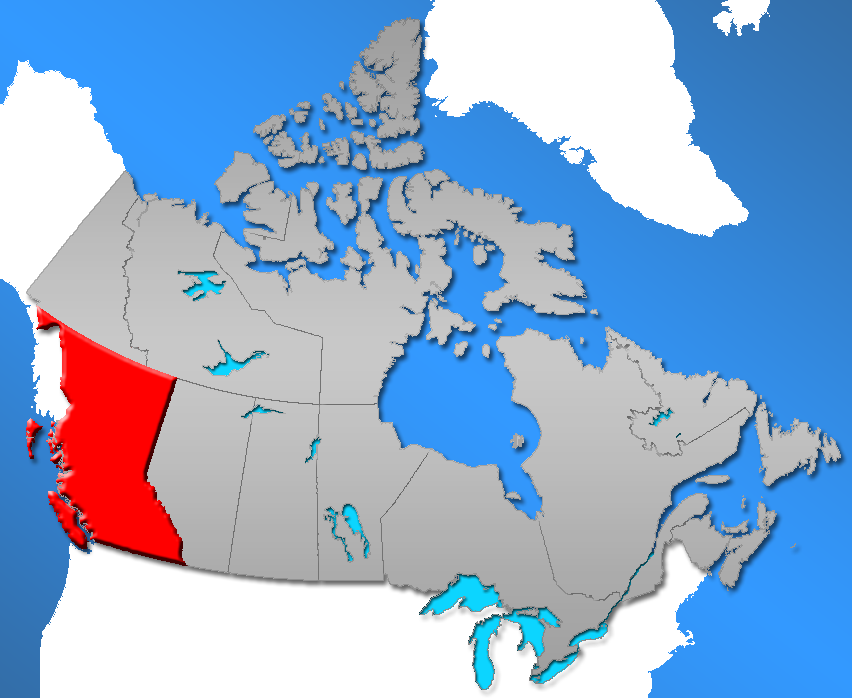
Communities in Canada's provinces and territories
- List of municipalities in British Columbia
- Demographics of British Columbia
- List of canneries in British Columbia
- List of census agglomerations in British Columbia
- List of designated places in British Columbia
- List of ghost towns in British Columbia
- List of Haida villages
- Category:Nisga'a villages
- List of place names in Canada of aboriginal origin
- List of population centres in British Columbia
- List of regional district electoral areas in British Columbia
