= Clayhurst =

Rural community in British Columbia, Canada

Coordinates: 56°11′00″N 120°03′00″W

Location of Clayhurst in British Columbia

Clayhurst is a rural community in British Columbia, Canada, located just north of the Peace River and just inside the British Columbia-Alberta boundary.

== History ==
When the local pioneers of the area met up to submit a name of the area to the BC Government, they decided on Clayhurst or Charyuchville. The BC Government chose Clayhurst, the "Clay" comes from the Clay family, and the "Hurst" comes from the Ukrainians who settled in the area.

== Road Access and Surrounding Communities ==
It has access to the North Peace region via Clayhurst Road and Cecil Lake Road, access to Albert via Cecil Lake Road and Alberta Highway 64, and access to the south of the province via Rolla Road and Highway 97 It is approximately 22 km from Goodlow, 5 km from Cherry Point, 53 km from Cecil Lake, 78 km from Fort St. John, 43 km from Rolla, 65 km from Dawson Creek and 185 km from Grande Prairie.

== Infrastructure ==
It has a cemetery, post office, and some regional parks in the area, including The Blackfoot Regional Park, Peace River Corridor Provincial Park, the Clayhurst Ecological Reserve, and the Clayhurst Cliffs Overlook. The cemetery is located on Forsythe Road, just inside the BC/Alberta border. The Post Office is located on 207th Road, just off Clayhurst Road.
