= Darfield =

Darfield may refer to:

- Darfield, British Columbia, a town in British Columbia just to the north of Kamloops
- Darfield, New Zealand, a town on the South Island
- Darfield, South Yorkshire, a village in the borough of Barnsley, South Yorkshire, England
