= Kelly Lake, British Columbia =

Locality in British Columbia, Canada

Coordinates: 55°15′00″N 120°02′00″W

Kelly Lake is a community in the Peace River Country of northeastern British Columbia, Canada. It is west of the border with the province of Alberta.

== Local disputes ==
The Kelly Lake Cree Nation (KLCN), the Kelly Lake First Nation (KLFN), and the Apetokosan Nation (AN) are three different groups who all claim to represent the Aboriginal community of the area. The Canadian government currently recognizes none as Aboriginal peoples, though they have been part of land claims in the courts and are recognized as stakeholders in the Northern Gateway Pipeline region by Enbridge.

== Recognition ==
In 2008, the British Columbia Assembly of First Nations endorsed the claims of the local people as a First Nation, supporting the claim that the people of Kelly Lake were left out during the enumeration of peoples living within the Treaty 8 area. In the 1999 court documents, both the KLCN and KLFN are described as a group of "Beaver, Cree, and Iroquois people". The chief of the KLCN has claimed Indigenous rights because of the group's Dane-zaa and Nehiyaw ancestry when speaking to a joint review panel on BC Hydro's Site C dam project. He also claimed that the people's traditional territory extends in Alberta.

Currently there are fewer than 100 people living in the small community and just 33 houses and an old school transformed into a Community Centre. The closest town is 40 miles (64 km) away so residents require vehicles if they should work. School pupils take a bus to Hythe Regional for the younger ones and then to Beaverlodge Regional High for grades 10-12. The Community Centre is open four days a week for the younger members to play in a gymnasium, or perform arts and crafts.

== See also ==
- List of communities in British Columbia
- List of organizations that self-identify as FNIM governments
