= Jacksons, British Columbia =

Coordinates: 57.618°N 131.684°W

Location of Jacksons in British Columbia

Jacksons is a settlement in British Columbia. According to a Canadian government resource, Jacksons is a scattered settlement of fifty or fewer individuals.
