= North Pine, British Columbia =

Coordinates: 56.422°N 120.736°W

Location of North Pine in British Columbia

North Pine is a settlement in British Columbia.
