= Sunset Prairie =

Coordinates: 55.870°N 120.767°W

Location of Sunset Prairie in British Columbia

Sunset Prairie is a settlement in British Columbia.
