= Big Silver Creek =

River in British Columbia, Canada

Coordinates: 49°34′45″N 121°50′14″W

The Silver River, aka the Big Silver River and Big Silver Creek, or zácta in the St'at'imcets language of the In-SHUCK-ch people, is the second-largest stream entering Harrison Lake in the Lower Mainland of British Columbia, Canada (the largest is the 209-km long Lillooet River, at the head of the lake). Rising in the central Lillooet Ranges to the east of the lake, it is approximately 40 km in length; its main tributary is the Little Silver River. A logging camp at its mouth was once a thriving community named Silver River.

== See also ==
- List of rivers of British Columbia
