= Sahtlam, British Columbia =

Community in British Columbia, Canada

Sahtlam
- Community
- Country: Canada
- Province: British Columbia
- Regional District: Cowichan Valley
- Time zone: UTC−07:00 (PT)

Sahtlam is a community on Vancouver Island, in the Canadian province of British Columbia, located west of the city of Duncan, and east of the town of Lake Cowichan. The name Sahtlam comes from "Saat laam," meaning "place of green leaves." Sahtlam had a school called Sahtlam School which was opened in 1890 on Menzies Road, before relocating to Cowichan Lake Road, some time after. The school was closed in 2002 due to budget cuts by the Cowichan Valley School District. Sahtlam has a fire hall ran by volunteers, called the Sahtlam Fire Department, which has been operating since 1971.

== See also ==
- List of communities in British Columbia
