= Boothroyd, British Columbia =

Coordinates: 49.524°N 121.431°W

Location of Boothroyd in British Columbia

Boothroyd (/ˈbuːθrɔɪd/ BOOTH-royd) is a settlement in the Fraser Canyon region of British Columbia, just north of Boston Bar-North Bend. It sits on a flat, alluvial bench which is some of the only flat land in the Fraser Canyon. It was the site of a Cariboo Roadhouse, run by a man named Boothroyd. Later it was a camp for Canadian Pacific Railway Chinese construction workers from 1882 to 1884.

The community was named after George Boothroyd (1829-1902). He and his brother kept a roadhouse here during the days of the Cariboo Road.

The BC Ministry of Environment has mapped Boothroyd in the Interior Douglas-fir zone, wet warm subzone (IDFww). Boothroyd is the first place where travellers heading north along the Trans-Canada Highway notice Ponderosa pine in considerable abundance as the climate becomes drier and more continental.

== See also ==
- Boothroyd First Nation
