= Attachie =

Coordinates: 56°13′00″N 121°25′00″W

Location of Attachie in British Columbia

Attachie is a locality in British Columbia, located at the confluence of the Halfway and Peace Rivers.

== Name origin ==
The locality is named for a Chief Attachie of the Dane-zaa (Beaver) people, who was a signee of Treaty 8 and a famous hunter who died in the great influenza epidemic of 1918-1919 and is buried at Halfway River.
