= Dogwood Valley =

Coordinates: 49°29′N 121°25′W

Dogwood Valley is an unincorporated community in the Fraser Canyon region of British Columbia, Canada, approximately midway between the towns of Yale and Hope. It was named in 1972 in reference to the many flowering dogwood trees in the area.

Its main presence on the Trans-Canada Highway is a gas station and attached diner.

== See also ==
- List of communities in British Columbia
