= Lindell Beach, British Columbia =

Coordinates: 49°02′00″N 122°01′00″W

Lindell Beach is a rural farming village in the Fraser Valley of the Lower Mainland region of the province of British Columbia, Canada, lying south of the City of Chilliwack. It is located at the south end of Cultus Lake which is the main waterbody in the Columbia Valley in the South Fraser Valley, and just north of the boundary of the United States.

From 2014 to 2019 the area has seen a significant increase in population due to several gated community developments.

== See also ==
- Whatcom Trail
- Cultus Lake, British Columbia (community)
- List of communities in British Columbia
