= Redroofs, British Columbia =

Coordinates: 49°30′00″N 123°55′00″W

Location of Redroofs in British Columbia

Redroofs is an unincorporated settlement in British Columbia, located south of Halfmoon Bay on the Sunshine Coast.
