= Silver River, British Columbia =

Human settlement in British Columbia, Canada

Coordinates: 49°34′39″N 121°49′09″W

Silver River was a logging camp on the east side of Harrison Lake in British Columbia, Canada. The camp was located at the mouth of Big Silver Creek, which is also unofficially called the Silver River or Big Silver River.

== First Nations village ==
A former First Nations village of the Lower Lillooet people of the In-SHUCK-ch Nation, (s)yáqtsa7, was at this location. The name also refers to a Transformer site in the locality.

== See also ==
- List of communities in British Columbia
