= Barnet, British Columbia =

Barnet
- Coordinates: 49.288°N 122.914°W
- Country: Canada
- Province: British Columbia
- City: Port Moody

Barnet is a settlement in British Columbia. It is part of Port Moody, British Columbia.
