= Taft, British Columbia =

Coordinates: 51.000°N 118.651°W

Location of Taft in British Columbia

Taft is a settlement in British Columbia in the Kamloops Division Yale Land District and Columbia-Shuswap Regional District, near Eagle Pass. It was named by the Canadian Pacific Railway after the manager of the Heed Lumber Company which operated a logging railway at that location. After the logging operation used to make ties and poles for building the CPR and mine closed in the early 1940s the town began to disappear and today not much is left, even the church and store are now gone.
