= Louie Sam =

Indigenous Canadian murder victim

- Born: c. 1870; Native village near Abbotsford, British Columbia
- Died: February 24, 1884 (14 years-old); Close to the Sumas U.S. border

Louie Sam (c. 1870 – February 24, 1884) was a Stó:lō youth from an Indigenous community near Abbotsford, British Columbia who was lynched by an American mob.

Sam was 14 at the time these events occurred. He had been accused of the murder of James Bell, a shopkeeper in Nooksack (today Whatcom County, Washington). The people of his band, today the Sumas First Nation at Kilgard turned him over to the B.C. government to settle the matter.

Following this, an angry mob crossed the border into Canada on February 24 and captured Sam, who had been in the custody of a B.C. deputy awaiting his trial at New Westminster. They then hanged him from a tree close to the U.S. border.

A subsequent investigation by Canadian authorities strongly suggests that Sam was innocent and that the likely murderers were two white Americans who were leaders of the lynch mob. They were William Osterman, the Nooksack telegraph operator who took over Bell's business, and David Harkness, who at the time of Bell's murder was living with Bell's estranged wife. Neither man was ever prosecuted.

On March 1, 2006, the Washington State Senate and House of Representatives approved a resolution stating that "through this resolution, the Senate joins its peers in the government of British Columbia, acknowledging the unfortunate historical injustice to Louie Sam and the proud Stó:lō people".

== In media ==
Books
Stewart, Elizabeth (2012). The Lynching of Louie Sam. Annick Press. ISBN 9781554514380. - Total pages: 288
Movies
The Lynching of Louie Sam (TV movie in production) from IMDb

== Bibliography ==
Notes

References

- Carlson, Keith (2010). The Power of Place, the Problem of Time: Aboriginal Identity and Historical Consciousness in the Cauldron of Colonialism. University of Toronto Press. ISBN 9780802098399. - Total pages: 375
- CBC News (March 1, 2006). "Washington state expresses regret over 1884 lynching of Canadian teen". CBC News.
- Vaillant, John (August 24, 2017). "The Lynching of Louie Sam". The Walrus.
