= Progress, British Columbia =

Place in the Peace River Country, Canada

Coordinates: 55.781°N 120.715°W

Location of Progress in British Columbia

Progress is an unincorporated community in the Peace River Country of British Columbia, Canada. It is located on the British Columbia Railway line (now Canadian National Railway where it crosses the John Hart Highway.
