= Black Creek, British Columbia =

Community in British Columbia, Canada

Coordinates: 49°50′46″N 125°07′58″W

Location of Black Creek in British Columbia

Black Creek is a community on the eastern side of Vancouver Island, British Columbia, Canada. It is approximately 16 kilometres (9.9 mi) north of Courtenay. It is primarily an agricultural hamlet and bedroom community to Courtenay and Campbell River - approximately 20 kilometres (12 mi) to the north. It is part of Electoral Area C in the Comox Valley Regional District.

== History ==
Black Creek was the host to several logging camps in the early years of the 20th century such as the Comox Logging & Railway Camp #3 which was on what is now Endall Road. Endall Road public easement joins the dead end road with Hamm Road. Part of the camp bunkhouse is now adjoined to a local estate home. The area was made available to German speaking Mennonite settlers primarily from the USSR via Mexico or the Canadian Prairie provinces in the 1930s. They left a legacy of hard work, wresting dairy and fruit growing farms from stony ground that had once boasted some of the largest Douglas firs in the world. It is still evident today in the many small but beautiful gardens and farms that line the Old Island Highway. The Mennonite tradition still lingers in the peaceful valley producing a population with enduring values.

In the 1950s many Austrian and German immigrants were sponsored by Black Creek Mennonites, and much of the life of the community was conducted in a mixture of German and English well into the 1960s. The conservative and church-oriented community contributed significantly to the musical and academic life of the Comox Valley, especially the high schools.

Today, Black Creek still retains two Mennonite churches (United Mennonite and Mennonite Brethren), though only a few of the original families still live in the area.

== Climate ==
Black creek has an oceanic climate because the driest month has just enough rainfall to avoid the warm summer Mediterranean Climate.

Climate data for Black Creek
Month	Jan	Feb	Mar	Apr	May	Jun	Jul	Aug	Sep	Oct	Nov	Dec	Year
Record high °C (°F)	14.5 (58.1)	16.0 (60.8)	20.0 (68.0)	26.5 (79.7)	28.5 (83.3)	32.0 (89.6)	34.0 (93.2)	35.0 (95.0)	29.5 (85.1)	22.5 (72.5)	18.0 (64.4)	11.5 (52.7)	35.0 (95.0)
Mean daily maximum °C (°F)	5.8 (42.4)	7.4 (45.3)	10.0 (50.0)	13.9 (57.0)	17.3 (63.1)	20.2 (68.4)	22.9 (73.2)	22.8 (73.0)	19.6 (67.3)	13.0 (55.4)	8.4 (47.1)	5.4 (41.7)	13.9 (57.0)
Daily mean °C (°F)	2.8 (37.0)	3.4 (38.1)	5.4 (41.7)	8.5 (47.3)	11.7 (53.1)	14.8 (58.6)	17.1 (62.8)	16.9 (62.4)	13.6 (56.5)	8.6 (47.5)	5.0 (41.0)	2.8 (37.0)	9.2 (48.6)
Mean daily minimum °C (°F)	−0.3 (31.5)	−0.6 (30.9)	0.9 (33.6)	3.1 (37.6)	6.1 (43.0)	9.3 (48.7)	11.3 (52.3)	10.9 (51.6)	7.5 (45.5)	4.2 (39.6)	1.6 (34.9)	0.2 (32.4)	4.5 (40.1)
Record low °C (°F)	−16.0 (3.2)	−13.0 (8.6)	−10.5 (13.1)	−3.5 (25.7)	−1.5 (29.3)	0.0 (32.0)	5.0 (41.0)	3.0 (37.4)	−1.5 (29.3)	−5.0 (23.0)	−11.0 (12.2)	−15.0 (5.0)	−16.0 (3.2)
Average precipitation mm (inches)	233.3 (9.19)	176.8 (6.96)	155.9 (6.14)	105.2 (4.14)	72.8 (2.87)	63.2 (2.49)	42.3 (1.67)	43.1 (1.70)	54.0 (2.13)	172.9 (6.81)	262.6 (10.34)	263.3 (10.37)	1,645.3 (64.78)
Average rainfall mm (inches)	216.0 (8.50)	166.8 (6.57)	149.3 (5.88)	105.0 (4.13)	72.8 (2.87)	63.2 (2.49)	42.3 (1.67)	43.1 (1.70)	54.0 (2.13)	171.8 (6.76)	256.2 (10.09)	247.3 (9.74)	1,587.8 (62.51)
Average snowfall cm (inches)	17.3 (6.8)	10.0 (3.9)	6.7 (2.6)	0.2 (0.1)	0.0 (0.0)	0.0 (0.0)	0.0 (0.0)	0.0 (0.0)	0.0 (0.0)	1.1 (0.4)	6.4 (2.5)	16.0 (6.3)	57.6 (22.7)
Source: Environment Canada
