= Kanaka Bar =

Coordinates: 50°07′N 121°34′W

Kanaka Bar is an unincorporated community and locality in the Fraser Canyon region of British Columbia, Canada, located near the town of Lytton. Named for a gold-bearing bar on the Fraser River below, which was mined by Hawaiians (called "Kanakas" in Chinook Jargon), Kanaka Bar is the home of the office and main rancherie of the Kanaka Bar Indian Band of the Nlaka'pamux peoples, and is also the source of the name of Kanaka Bar Indian Reserve No. 1A and Kanaka Bar Indian Reserve No. 2 which are governed by the band.

The community lies within the Interior Douglas-Fir (IDF) Biogeoclimatic Zone and is on the boundary between "very dry hot" (IDFxh1) and "wet warm" (IDFww) variants, an early stage of a transition from interior to coastal ecotypes that is seen as one travels south in the Fraser Canyon from Lytton to Hope.

== See also ==
- Kanakas
- Kanaka Creek, British Columbia
