= Shutty Bench, British Columbia =

Coordinates: 49.9579°N 116.9052°W

Shutty Bench is a small rural community about 6 kilometres (4 mi) north of Kaslo in the West Kootenay region of southeastern British Columbia. The former steamboat landing is at the mouth of Shutty Creek on the western shore of Kootenay Lake. The locality, on BC Highway 31, is about 75 kilometres (47 mi) by road northeast of Nelson.

== Name origin ==
Around 1897 or 1898, Andrew Shutty arrived, claimed roughly 500 acres, built a log house, and began farming. Shortly afterward, a forest fire swept through the area, and the benchland was subsequently subdivided and sold to newly arriving Austrian and Slovak settlers. The earliest known newspaper reference to Shutty Bench dates to 1909. At the time, some referred to the area as British Bench—perhaps in jest—after an influx of British settlers. Other names, such as Ronda, Rhonda, or Rhonda Beach, were also used, though these most likely referred specifically to the beach, the community’s primary access point.

== Early community ==
All the habitable land on the bench and waterfront was claimed or purchased prior to World War I. Drawn by CP publicity, many came from England with dreams of establishing a commercial orchard. However, the lengthy time for an apple orchard to mature and bear fruit, and the ultimate glut of producers, proved disappointing. The apple and cherry orchards that did develop in the area steadily diminished.

== Shutty Bench School ==
The B.C. Public Schools Report dated October 16, 1913, covering the school year ending June 30, 1913, noted that a new Grade 1–8 school had been established at Shutty Bench. The first recorded teacher was Miss Florence I. Raddish.

In its early years, most teachers—typically single women—remained for only one or two years before moving on to other schools, usually within the region. A notable exception to this pattern was Mrs. Mary E. Orman, who taught from 1919 to 1923, during which time enrolment reached a maximum of 16 students per year. Teachers’ salaries initially averaged $70 per month, increasing to $85 per month following World War I.

In 1928, Miss Kathleen Murphy—a teacher at Shutty Bench School—reported to the Department of Education in Victoria, B.C., that a room had been annexed to the school building for use as teacher accommodation. She chose, however, to live in Kaslo and travel to the school by horseback each day.

Another long-serving teacher was Ronald Seal, who, after teaching at the one-room school in Mirror Lake, taught at Shutty Bench from 1934 to 1938. During his tenure, he married Olivia Dickson, and the couple had a son and a daughter. Enrolment during the 1937–1938 school year stood at 21 students.

Throughout the 1930s to the 1950s, the Shutty Bench Community Club organized dances, card parties, and other social events at the schoolhouse. The building even served the community as a polling station during elections.

The final teacher at Shutty Bench School was Elsie E. Rogers, who taught during the 1945–1946 school year and earned a salary of $100 per month. Following the school’s closure in 1946, students were transported by bus to attend school in Kaslo.

Naomi Miller’s statement (referenced below)—she being the daughter of early Shutty Bench settler Alan Pole Allsebrook—that the schoolhouse was demolished in 1950 is incorrect. Official discussions regarding the disposal of the building and surrounding property did not begin until 1964, coinciding with road improvement plans related to the construction of the Duncan Dam (Nelson Daily News, March 14, 1964).

== Transportation & roads ==
In its early years, access was limited to lake steamers or small boats. A wagon road from Kaslo to Shutty Bench was constructed between 1909 and 1910 and, in 1911, extended through the scattered community. Despite these improvements, walking to and from Kaslo remained common.

In 1913, the federal government built a public wharf, creating an essential transportation link that remained in use until the Nelson–Kaslo road opened in May 1926. For convenience, steamboats often continued to unload freight directly onto the beach nearest the consignee. From 1923 to 1956, Canadian Pacific Steamer timetables for the Proctor–Kaslo–Lardeau run listed the stop as “Schuletty.” On Saturdays, the sternwheeler departed Proctor at 7:00 a.m., stopping at its customary landings as it worked its way up the lake, arriving in Lardeau at noon. It then returned by the same route, reaching Proctor that evening.

Many residents paid their property taxes by working with picks, shovels, and wheelbarrows on road maintenance. Prior to World War II, winter snow was cleared using a horse-drawn wooden plow; this was later replaced by a mechanical grader.

The completion of the road linking Shutty Bench to the Lardeau region in 1952 provided a dependable overland route and gradually reduced reliance on lake transportation. As highway travel improved, demand for steamboat service declined, and the Canadian Pacific Railway faced the prohibitive cost of another major overhaul and boiler replacement for the aging Moyie (sternwheeler). Consequently, the SS Moyie was decommissioned in 1957, bringing nearly sixty years of service on Kootenay Lake to an end.

== Present community ==
In earlier years, these properties served mainly as weekend retreats or as part of a bedroom community for Kaslo, Nelson, and Trail. Today, the area has shifted toward tourism, with resorts, guest houses, cabins, and camping facilities catering to visitors. An operation such as the Lakewood Inn, which opened cabins around 1930, has expanded under subsequent owners.
