= Shere, British Columbia =

- Locality
- Location of Shere in British Columbia
- Coordinates: 53°35′00″N 120°41′00″W
- Country: Canada
- Province: British Columbia
- Regional District: Fraser-Fort George
- Time zone: UTC−07:00 (PT)

Shere is a former station on the Canadian National Railway east of McBride, British Columbia. It was named by the Grand Trunk Pacific Railway after the engineer in charge of construction of this section of the railway.
