= Pinchi Lake =

- Location of Pinchi Lake in British Columbia
- Coordinates: 54°38′00″N 124°25′00″W
- Country: Canada
- Province: British Columbia

Pinchi Lake is a ghost town located in the Omineca Country region of British Columbia, Canada. The town is situated north of Pinchi Lake, northwest of Fort St. James. The town was originally a settlement for a mercury mine.
