= Clayburn, Abbotsford =

Clayburn Clayburn Village
- Company Town
- Location of Clayburn in British Columbia
- Coordinates: 49°05′00″N 122°16′00″W
- Country: Canada
- Province: British Columbia

Clayburn is British Columbia’s first company town. It is situated at the foot of Sumas Mountain within the boundaries of the City of Abbotsford. Today the village and the brick plant site are classified as the municipally designated Clayburn Village Heritage Conservation Area. The Clayburn church and Clayburn schoolhouse are provincially designated heritage buildings. Clayburn is home to the Clayburn Village Store, which sells UK candies and sweets from other countries. The storefront of the building is often used for filming Hallmark Christmas movies. The Clayburn Schoolhouse is also often used as a film set.

In 1905, the Vancouver Fireclay Company was established and started manufacturing bricks using the brand name ‘Clayburn’ on its products. The original townsite was built between 1905 and 1908 on the South side of Clayburn Road. The brick plant was on the North side of the road on a 20-acre site. The Fireclay Company manufactured the sought-after firebrick, building brick and other fireclay products, they were shipped worldwide and used to build many Vancouver buildings. The company employed up to 180 men.

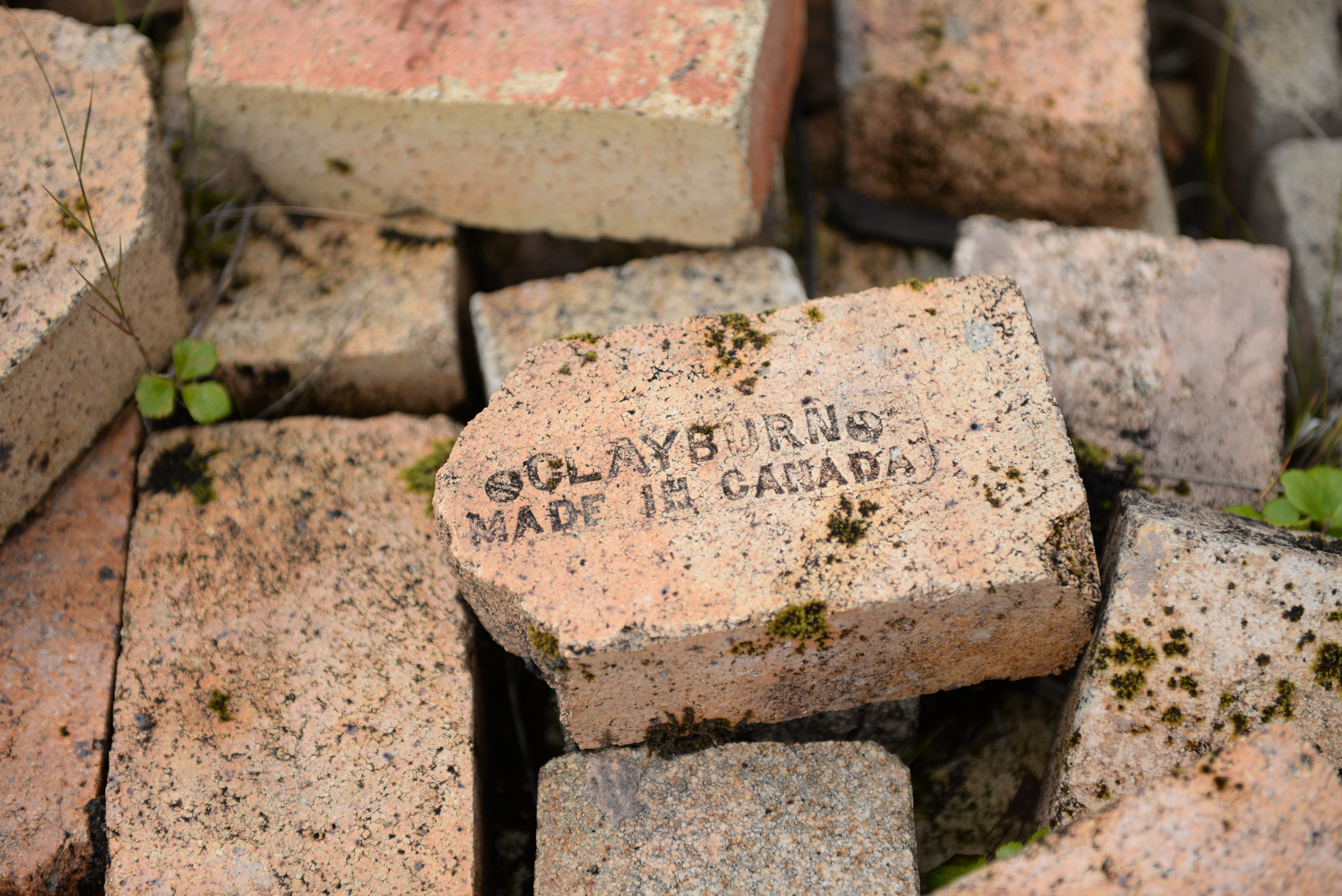
Clayburn Bricks

In 1909, the Vancouver Fireclay Company was reorganized and changed its name to Clayburn Company Limited and by 1918 it had established itself as the dominant brick company in British Columbia and their bricks were shipped worldwide. This was due initially to the hard work and foresight of Charles Maclure who discovered the rich clay deposits of Sumas Mountain and who brought investors in to create the enterprise.

Kelly Creek (Clayburn Creek) runs from the hills of Sumas Mountain through Matsqui Prairie to the Fraser River and burn is the Scottish word for creek. This is thought to be the origin of the name Clayburn. In 1906, a post office was opened in Charles Purver’s store, a village name was needed and the town of Clayburn was established.

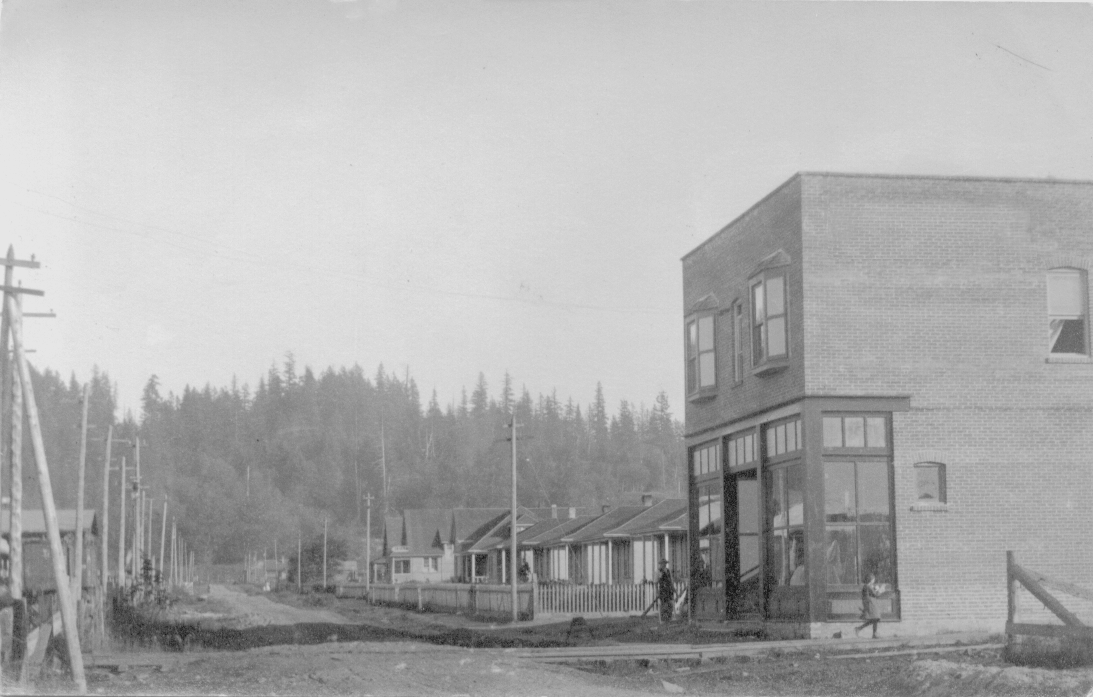
Looking east on Clayburn Road at Wright Street. Cooper Seldon Co Store and brick houses on right, brick plant on left

The Maclure family homestead Hazelbrae, was a mile west of Clayburn and many of the family members were involved with Charles in the development of the brick plant. The architect Samuel Maclure, older brother to Charles, is thought to have designed the original homes and the concept of the townsite. The pre-1909 brick row of houses in Clayburn Village achieved a unity of appearance, which was unique in BC. The use of brick, shingle, window details, and certain interior features were inspired by the Arts and Crafts Movement. The incorporation of other general architectural styles such as the bungalow roof and verandah, suggests that the houses were the product of a trained architect. This theory is corroborated by the ideal positioning of the houses in relation to each other so as to best take advantage of the vista of Sumas Mountain to the east. Samuel Maclure’s architectural style can be detected in several features of the design and positioning of the houses and it is likely that he was the architect responsible for the general designing of the first 7 houses: the Plant Manager’s house, the Accountant’s house and 5 foreman’s cottages.

By 1909, Charles Maclure had been removed from Clayburn Company and the original ‘townsite concept’ was not maintained. John Browne Millar replaced Charlie Maclure as plant manager and his arrival marked the beginning of a period of expansion both at the plant and in the village. About a dozen new buildings were erected in Clayburn in one year, among them four more cottages that were added to the row of seven original brick houses on Clayburn Road. Two of the four bungalows were built using clinker bricks, overfired rejects that at the time were valued for their special-design effect. The other two fill-in-bungalows were wood buildings.

Behind Clayburn Road on Armstrong Ave, more housing was built for the workers; they were referred to as the six green houses and six red shacks. All the homes in Clayburn Village were inhabited by the employees and rent was paid to the Company. Terms for renting a brick house in the original subdivision in 1909 were $3 - $5 per month. (Following the post war inflation in 1920, a foremen’s cottage rent went up to $8).

In 1911, an independent store was erected, and the Cooper Seldon Co. general store provided the needs of the community. It was operated by the Cooper family until 1972. The building changed hands a few times and re-emerged as the well-known Clayburn Village Tea House in 1984 and is still the hub of the village. There were other independent stores, Case’s store and Bullock’s butcher shop but neither remain today. A Chinese laundry also operated behind the houses as well as a blacksmith.

The Clayburn Company built a wooden school in 1907 and donated the land and bricks for a church in 1912, both are located on Wright St.

There was a ‘new subdivision’ in 1911 which expanded the original townsite to the west side of Wright St. For the first time, some of the new lots were offered for purchase to the public except for one new company-built house for Roderick Reid, the Works Accountant.

The Clayburn brick plant site closed in 1930 with production continuing at its sister plant in Kilgard. The Kilgard Company was also founded by Charles Maclure in 1913 and purchased by the Clayburn Company in 1918. Many factors were likely the reason for the closure of the Clayburn site: the 1930’s depression was setting in and it was costly to run two sites, old infrastructure at the Clayburn site, Kilgard was closer to the source of clay within Sumas Mountain and the train trestles bringing the clay from Straiton to Clayburn were in need of repair.

The plant was dismantled during the 1930s. The company paid local residents half a cent per brick they cleaned and stacked. In this way through the 1930s eleven kilns, six round and five rectangular ones, the storage buildings, the office, the tunnel dryer, and the massive smokestack bearing CLAYBURN 1911 were taken down, until by 1940 nothing except a few ruined foundations remained.

The workers continued living in the company houses in Clayburn and were transported to work to Kilgard. Times were tough and during WWII, the Clayburn company sold the houses, offering them to Clayburn veterans for $300 first and then they were offered to the public.

In 1917 the Clayburn Athletic Association formed as the community was vibrant and active with many sports teams. A soccer pitch, tennis court, and small golf course was built behind the houses and were all well used. They no longer exist today.

In 1967 the dormant Clayburn Athletic Association was reactivated, and in 1992, the name was changed to the Clayburn Village Community Society (CVCS). The not-for-profit CVCS has an elected Board of Directors and continues to oversee the historic village and owns the historic church, school, and park across from the store. Part of its mandate is to preserve and protect the historic buildings and educate the public about the history of Clayburn. Revenue to uphold the mandate comes from renting out the school and church for events, and renting to the movie industry using the unique townsite and buildings for filming.

The Clayburn Village Museum is presented by the CVCS and operated by volunteers. It is located in the basement of the restored schoolhouse and displays a scale model of Clayburn, circa 1920 and many other artifacts from the brick plant and the village.

clayburnvillage.com

== See also ==
- Kilgard, British Columbia
