= Lamming Mills =

Lamming Mills, British Columbia
- Railway point, former town
- Location of Lamming Mills in British Columbia
- Coordinates: 53°21′00″N 120°16′00″W
- Country: Canada
- Province: British Columbia
- Regional District: Fraser-Fort George
- Elevation: 780 m (2,560 ft)
- Time zone: UTC8 (Pacific Standard Time)
  - Summer (DST): UTC7 (Pacific Daylight Time)
- Postal code: V0J 2E0
- Area code: 250

Lamming Mills is a railway point and former unincorporated community located on the Canadian National Railway line just northwest of McBride, British Columbia in the Cariboo Land District. It stands near a bend of the upper Fraser River and is connected by road to the Highway 16 section of the Yellowhead Highway. It was one of the oldest settlements in the Robson Valley.

The site was originally established circa 1915 as the Mile 5.4 Cariboo Siding of the Grand Trunk Pacific Railway. It was relocated two miles northwest around 1920 to service a pole yard, and renamed "Craibenn Station" after railway section foreman D.A. Craig and yard owner J. Bennett.

In 1943, brothers and sawmill owners Oscar and Ernie Lamming came to the McBride area and established a portable sawmill at the siding. By 1945 a small town had developed, occupied by the mill workers and their families, and a post office opened in April of that year which was known as the "Lamming Mills Post Office". The portable mill was replaced by a more permanent structure in 1946, and on 12 June 1946 the Canadian National Railway renamed the station to "Lamming Mills", with the name being adopted by the settlement.

By the 1950s the town had a population of approximately 250 people living in 60 homes, with a church, school, community hall and general store also having been established. It declined over the next decade, however, with the mill closing in 1966 and most residents leaving following the closure of the post office on 31 December 1969.

By 2011 the town consisted of 52 buildings. In March of that year it was purchased by the Seattle-based company "ecoTECH Energy Group" for $257,075. It stated that it planned to build a biomass power plant and aquaponics facility on the site, and the remaining tenants were given until June 10, 2011 to move out. On June 12, 2011, by which time only two homes remained occupied, a fire started in the town, destroying 21 empty properties. The McBride & District Volunteer Fire Department was able to save the remainder of the structures, including the occupied homes, and there were no casualties. The RCMP stated at the time that they were treating the fire as arson. In September 2012, with development work at the site yet to commence, ecoTECH put the Lamming Mills site up for sale.
