= Groundbirch =

Community in north-east of British Colombia, Canada

Coordinates: 55.7815°N 120.9231°W

Groundbirch is a community in the north-east of British Columbia, Canada. Situated on British Columbia Highway 97, it is approximately halfway between Dawson Creek and Chetwynd. On the east side there is Progress and to the west side there is East Pine. The Groundbirch Store is locally owned and operated. Additionally, there are two halls, the Groundbirch Hall and the McLeod Hall. An elementary school serves grades K to 9.

Groundbirch is also the site of a large natural gas plant operated by Shell. The Coastal GasLink Pipeline has proposed a project to pipe natural gas from Groundbirch to an export terminal in Kitimat, BC.
