= Laidlaw, British Columbia =

Unincorporated settlement in Canada

Coordinates: 49°19′27″N 121°36′15″W

Location of Laidlaw in British Columbia

Laidlaw is an unincorporated settlement in the Upper Fraser Valley region of British Columbia, Canada, located just west of the westernmost boundary of Hope, British Columbia on the south side of the Fraser River and along the Trans-Canada Highway.

Laidlaw is the base of the only road into Wahleach Lake (commonly known as Jones Lake).

Originally known as St. Elmo, when the Canadian Northern Railway laid two tracks across the farm of W.F. Laidlaw he insisted the station be given his name.

== Climate ==
Climate data for Laidlaw
Month	Jan	Feb	Mar	Apr	May	Jun	Jul	Aug	Sep	Oct	Nov	Dec	Year
Record high °C (°F)	14.5 (58.1)	18.5 (65.3)	25.0 (77.0)	30.5 (86.9)	37.5 (99.5)	35.0 (95.0)	38.0 (100.4)	37.5 (99.5)	36.5 (97.7)	28.5 (83.3)	17.5 (63.5)	13.5 (56.3)	38.0 (100.4)
Mean daily maximum °C (°F)	4.6 (40.3)	7.5 (45.5)	11.4 (52.5)	15.2 (59.4)	18.5 (65.3)	21.2 (70.2)	24.3 (75.7)	25.0 (77.0)	21.3 (70.3)	14.3 (57.7)	7.7 (45.9)	4.2 (39.6)	14.6 (58.3)
Daily mean °C (°F)	2.2 (36.0)	4.2 (39.6)	7.1 (44.8)	10.2 (50.4)	13.6 (56.5)	16.3 (61.3)	18.8 (65.8)	19.3 (66.7)	16.2 (61.2)	10.7 (51.3)	5.4 (41.7)	2.0 (35.6)	10.5 (50.9)
Mean daily minimum °C (°F)	−0.3 (31.5)	0.9 (33.6)	2.8 (37.0)	5.0 (41.0)	8.5 (47.3)	11.1 (52.0)	13.1 (55.6)	13.3 (55.9)	10.8 (51.4)	6.9 (44.4)	3.0 (37.4)	−0.3 (31.5)	6.2 (43.2)
Record low °C (°F)	−17.0 (1.4)	−18.0 (−0.4)	−8.5 (16.7)	−1.5 (29.3)	0.5 (32.9)	5.0 (41.0)	7.0 (44.6)	7.5 (45.5)	3.0 (37.4)	−10.0 (14.0)	−20.5 (−4.9)	−18.0 (−0.4)	−20.5 (−4.9)
Average precipitation mm (inches)	287.6 (11.32)	194.3 (7.65)	201.2 (7.92)	166.6 (6.56)	131.8 (5.19)	113.8 (4.48)	84.7 (3.33)	64.2 (2.53)	104.7 (4.12)	229.6 (9.04)	352.7 (13.89)	255.8 (10.07)	2,186.8 (86.09)
Average rainfall mm (inches)	262.6 (10.34)	177.7 (7.00)	193.5 (7.62)	165.8 (6.53)	131.8 (5.19)	113.8 (4.48)	84.7 (3.33)	64.2 (2.53)	104.7 (4.12)	228.9 (9.01)	344.8 (13.57)	236.2 (9.30)	2,108.5 (83.01)
Average snowfall cm (inches)	24.9 (9.8)	16.6 (6.5)	7.7 (3.0)	0.8 (0.3)	0.0 (0.0)	0.0 (0.0)	0.0 (0.0)	0.0 (0.0)	0.0 (0.0)	0.6 (0.2)	7.9 (3.1)	19.6 (7.7)	78.2 (30.8)
Average precipitation days (≥ 0.2 mm)	20.7	16.7	19.9	18.0	17.1	14.5	10.5	8.8	11.2	17.5	21.2	18.0	194.2
Average rainy days (≥ 0.2 mm)	18.2	15.2	19.5	18.0	17.1	14.5	10.5	8.8	11.2	17.4	20.7	16.0	187.1
Average snowy days (≥ 0.2 cm)	4.5	2.8	1.1	0.31	0.0	0.0	0.0	0.0	0.0	0.15	1.5	3.9	14.26
Source: Environment Canada

== Demographics ==
- Population: 915
- Growth Rate (2011–2016): 26.9%
- Total Private Dwellings: 726
- Area: 3,087.25 km^{2}.
- Density: 0.3 people per km^{2}.
