= Ben-My-Chree, British Columbia =

Former hunting lodge in Atlin, British Columbia

Coordinates: 59°24′50″N 134°27′10″W

Ben-My-Chree (Manx for "woman of my heart") is a famous former hunting and fishing lodge, steamboat landing and small resort in Northern British Columbia, Canada. It is located at the southwest end of Taku Arm, Tagish Lake in the Atlin District in the extreme northwest of the province, and is closer to the Yukon than the rest of the province. The Wall Street crash of 1929 and the Great Depression began the resort's decline, and it closed in 1956. The site is now a private residence being reclaimed by wilderness.

== History ==
Ben-My-Chree was the destination of a steamer trip from Carcross, Yukon and was initially built by a Mr and Mrs Oscar Partridge, who originated on the Isle of Man. It was visited by wealthy socialites during the 1920s. At its height, thousands visited Ben-My-Chree in one year. The resort, which had several buildings, was bought from their estate by the White Pass and Yukon Route, and later sold to an American buyer.
