= Taku, British Columbia =

Taku T'aañú
- Location of Taku in British Columbia
- Coordinates: 59°38′00″N 133°51′00″W
- Country: Canada
- Province: British Columbia
- Area codes: 250, 778

Taku, also known as Taku Landing (Tlingit: T'aañú), is a locality on Graham Inlet of the Taku Arm of Tagish Lake in the Atlin District of far northwestern British Columbia, Canada. It was the transshipment point for passengers and freight from Carcross, Yukon bound for Atlin, British Columbia and was the start of a tramway connecting Taku Arm to Atlin Lake, where another steamer ferried passengers and cargo to Atlin.

== See also ==
- Atlin Gold Rush
- Klondike Gold Rush
