= Nursery, British Columbia =

Coordinates: 49°01′00″N 118°24′00″W

Nursery is an unincorporated community in the Similkameen Division Yale Land District of British Columbia. The community is east of Grand Forks, British Columbia, Canada.
