= Carlson, British Columbia =

- Locality
- Location of Carlson in British Columbia
- Coordinates: 53°58′15″N 122°34′15″W
- Country: Canada
- Province: British Columbia
- Regional District: Fraser-Fort George

Carlson is a locality situated north of Tabor Lake, British Columbia. It is considered a part of greater Prince George.
