= Aitchelitch Indian Reserve No. 9 =

Coordinates: 49°09′00″N 121°59′00″W

Aitchelitch 9, a.k.a. Aitchelitch Indian Reserve No. 9, is an Indian Reserve within the City of Chilliwack, British Columbia, Canada, in the Eastern Fraser Valley of the province's Lower Mainland region. It is located two and a half miles southwest of downtown Chilliwack. It is the home reserve and under the governance of the Aitchelitz First Nation.

== See also ==
- List of Indian reserves in British Columbia
- Atchelitz
