= Castledale =

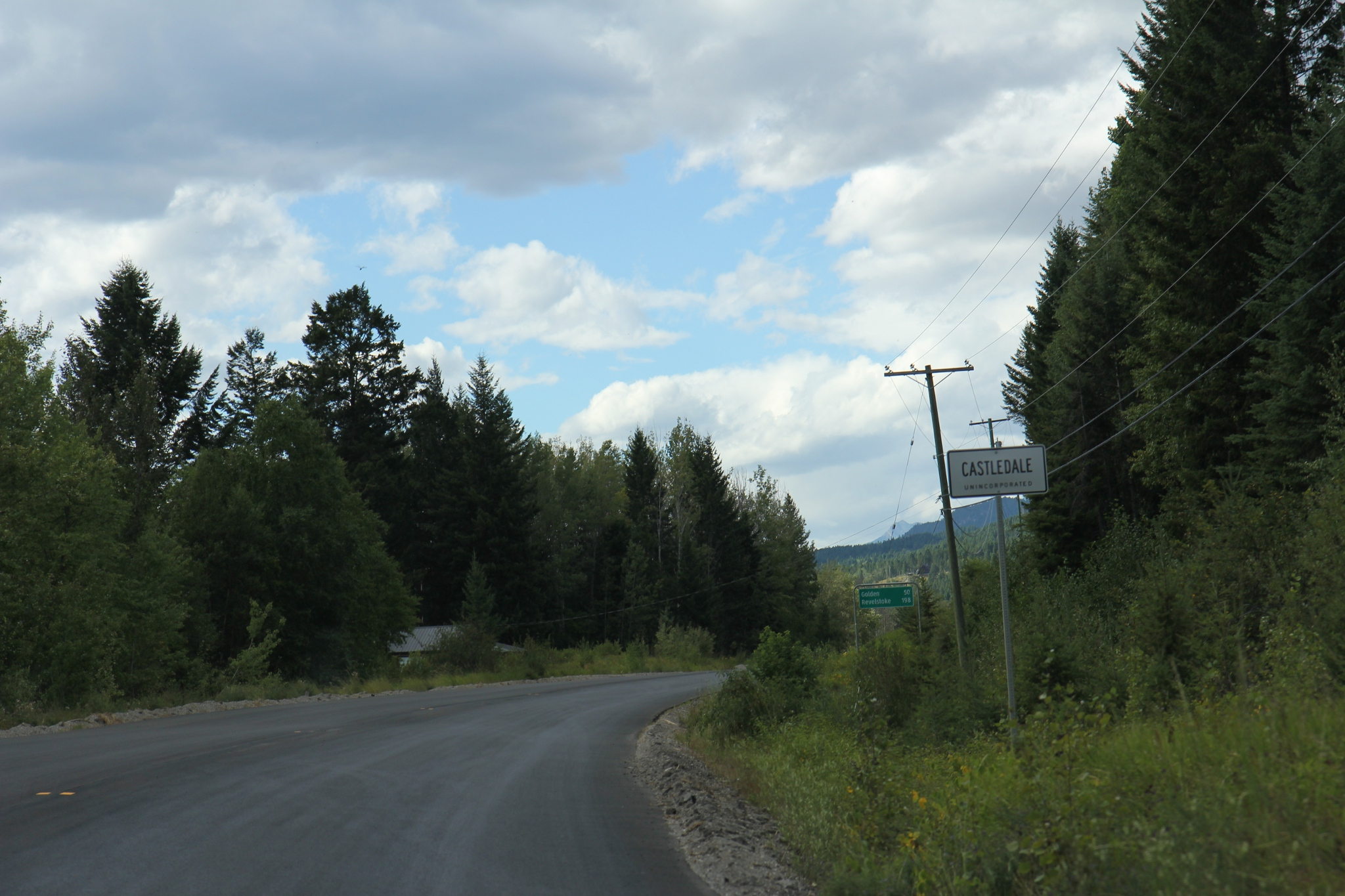
- Sign for Castledale

- Location of Castledale in British Columbia
- Coordinates: 51°1′15″N 116°31′30″W
- Country: Canada
- Province: British Columbia
- Region: Columbia Valley
- Regional District: Columbia-Shuswap
- Time zone: UTC-7 (MST)
  - Summer (DST): UTC-6 (MDT)
- Area codes: 250, 778

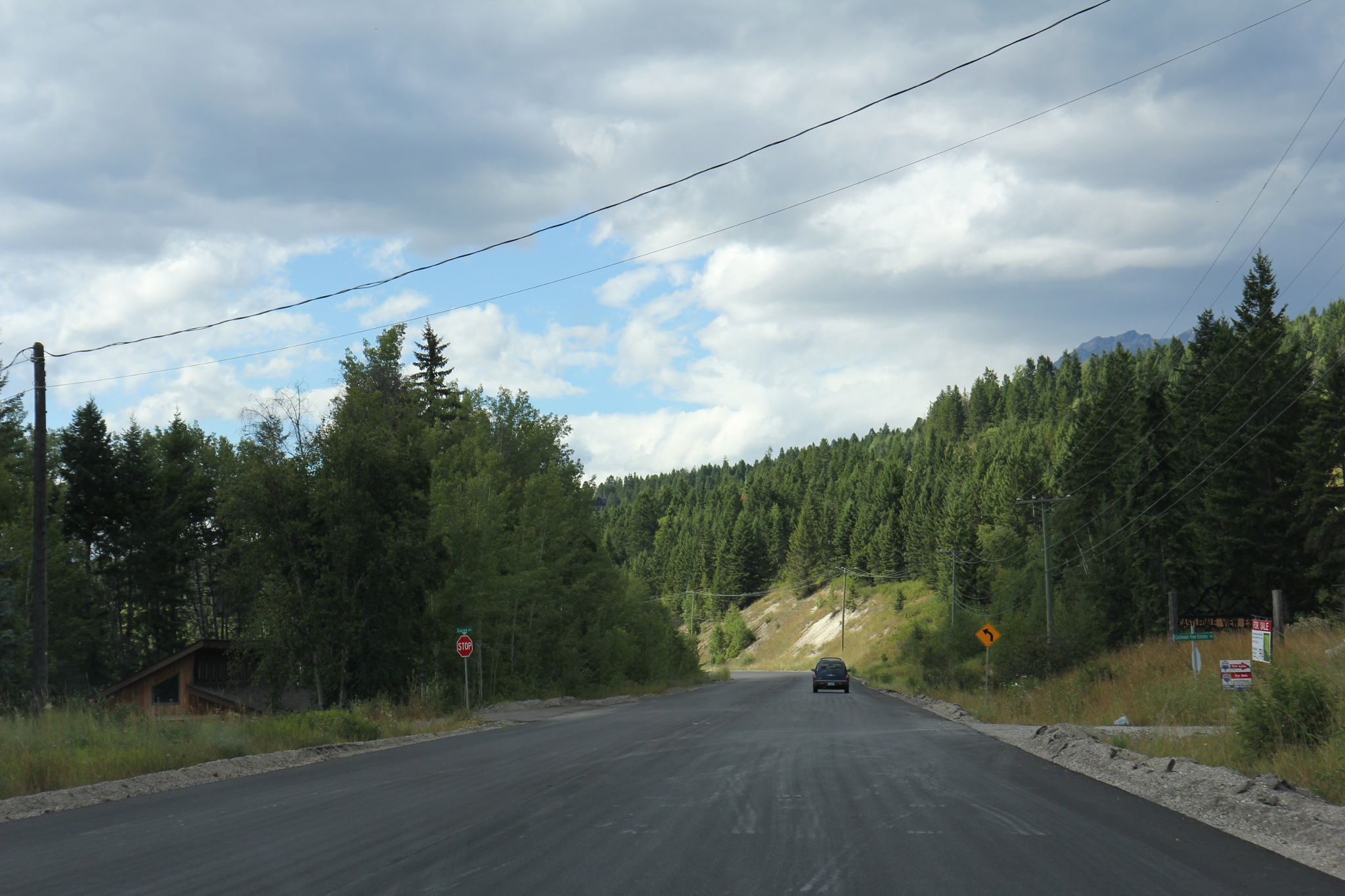
Roads in Castledale on BC95

Castledale is an unincorporated community in the Columbia-Shuswap Regional District region of British Columbia. It is located along the Upper Columbia River between Parson and Spillamacheen. British Columbia Highway 95 passes through the community.
