= Sikanni Chief =

- Location of Sikanni Chief in British Columbia
- Coordinates: 57°14′00″N 122°42′00″W
- Country: Canada
- Province: British Columbia
- Area codes: 250, 778

Sikanni Chief is an unincorporated locality in the Northern Rocky Mountains of British Columbia, Canada. It is located on the north bank of the Sikanni Chief River, at an elevation of 800 meters (2,600 ft). Highway 97 / Alaska Highway runs through this place.

== Climate ==
There is a weather station for Sikanni Chief located along the Alaska Highway at an elevation of 937 m (3074 ft).

Climate data for Sikanni Chief, British Columbia, 1991-2015 normals, 1990-2015 extremes: 937m (3074ft)
Month	Jan	Feb	Mar	Apr	May	Jun	Jul	Aug	Sep	Oct	Nov	Dec	Year
Record high °C (°F)	13 (55)	14 (58)	18 (64)	23 (73)	29 (85)	31 (87)	33 (91)	31 (88)	28 (83)	27 (80)	14 (57)	14 (58)	33 (91)
Mean maximum °C (°F)	7.2 (45.0)	9.4 (49.0)	9.4 (48.9)	16.7 (62.1)	22.4 (72.4)	25.3 (77.5)	28.2 (82.7)	27.3 (81.1)	23.1 (73.5)	18.2 (64.7)	7.1 (44.8)	5.5 (41.9)	29.1 (84.4)
Mean daily maximum °C (°F)	−7.4 (18.7)	−2.4 (27.6)	−0.3 (31.4)	7.8 (46.0)	13.8 (56.8)	18.1 (64.5)	20.6 (69.0)	19.2 (66.5)	14.4 (58.0)	6.9 (44.4)	−2.3 (27.8)	−6.9 (19.6)	6.8 (44.2)
Daily mean °C (°F)	−12.8 (9.0)	−8.7 (16.4)	−6.7 (19.9)	1.7 (35.0)	7.2 (45.0)	11.7 (53.0)	13.9 (57.0)	12.3 (54.2)	8.1 (46.6)	1.7 (35.0)	−7.2 (19.0)	−11.9 (10.5)	0.8 (33.4)
Mean daily minimum °C (°F)	−18.2 (−0.7)	−14.8 (5.4)	−12.9 (8.7)	−4.4 (24.0)	0.7 (33.2)	5.3 (41.5)	7.3 (45.2)	5.6 (42.0)	1.8 (35.2)	−3.6 (25.5)	−12.1 (10.3)	−16.9 (1.5)	−5.2 (22.7)
Mean minimum °C (°F)	−35.0 (−31.0)	−28.7 (−19.6)	−28.6 (−19.5)	−13.6 (7.5)	−5.9 (21.4)	−0.4 (31.2)	2.1 (35.8)	−0.9 (30.4)	−5.2 (22.7)	−14.2 (6.5)	−25.4 (−13.7)	−31.4 (−24.5)	−37.6 (−35.7)
Record low °C (°F)	−44 (−47)	−42 (−43)	−42 (−44)	−25 (−13)	−15 (5)	−3 (26)	−2 (28)	−7 (20)	−9 (15)	−24 (−11)	−36 (−33)	−43 (−46)	−44 (−47)
Average precipitation mm (inches)	20 (0.80)	18 (0.70)	25 (0.98)	28 (1.09)	58 (2.28)	109 (4.29)	96 (3.79)	80 (3.16)	37 (1.45)	32 (1.26)	27 (1.06)	26 (1.02)	556 (21.88)
Average snowfall cm (inches)	23 (8.9)	18 (7.0)	25 (9.7)	23 (9.0)	13 (5.2)	2.0 (0.8)	trace	0.76 (0.3)	7.1 (2.8)	27 (10.5)	27 (10.6)	26 (10.2)	191.86 (75)
Source: XMACIS2 (normals, extremes & precip/snow)

== See also ==
- Sekani
