= Nass Camp =

Settlement in British Columbia, Canada

Coordinates: 55.289°N 128.994°W

Location of Nass Camp in British Columbia, Canada

Nass Camp is a settlement in British Columbia, Canada. Nass Camp is north-east of Prince Rupert, British Columbia, Canada.

== Climate ==
Nass Camp experiences a continental climate (Köppen Dfb) with some maritime influence due to its proximity to the Pacific Ocean.

Climate data for Nass Camp
Month	Jan	Feb	Mar	Apr	May	Jun	Jul	Aug	Sep	Oct	Nov	Dec	Year
Record high °C (°F)	10.5 (50.9)	12.0 (53.6)	16.0 (60.8)	26.5 (79.7)	33.0 (91.4)	36.0 (96.8)	34.5 (94.1)	36.0 (96.8)	32.2 (90.0)	22.0 (71.6)	13.5 (56.3)	12.0 (53.6)	36.0 (96.8)
Mean daily maximum °C (°F)	−2.3 (27.9)	1.8 (35.2)	6.5 (43.7)	12.0 (53.6)	16.6 (61.9)	19.7 (67.5)	21.4 (70.5)	20.9 (69.6)	16.0 (60.8)	9.3 (48.7)	2.0 (35.6)	−1.2 (29.8)	10.2 (50.4)
Daily mean °C (°F)	−5.6 (21.9)	−2.3 (27.9)	1.7 (35.1)	5.9 (42.6)	10.4 (50.7)	13.9 (57.0)	15.8 (60.4)	15.3 (59.5)	11.3 (52.3)	5.6 (42.1)	−0.8 (30.6)	−3.9 (25.0)	5.6 (42.1)
Mean daily minimum °C (°F)	−8.7 (16.3)	−6.4 (20.5)	−3.2 (26.2)	−0.2 (31.6)	4.0 (39.2)	8.0 (46.4)	10.1 (50.2)	9.7 (49.5)	6.5 (43.7)	1.8 (35.2)	−3.6 (25.5)	−6.7 (19.9)	0.9 (33.7)
Record low °C (°F)	−32.5 (−26.5)	−28.5 (−19.3)	−22.2 (−8.0)	−9.5 (14.9)	−5.0 (23.0)	−2.0 (28.4)	1.5 (34.7)	1.1 (34.0)	−3.0 (26.6)	−18.5 (−1.3)	−31.0 (−23.8)	−31.5 (−24.7)	−32.5 (−26.5)
Average precipitation mm (inches)	137.4 (5.41)	69.4 (2.73)	50.1 (1.97)	48.0 (1.89)	50.0 (1.97)	60.7 (2.39)	58.6 (2.31)	77.2 (3.04)	116.8 (4.60)	156.1 (6.15)	137.0 (5.39)	130.6 (5.14)	1,091.9 (42.99)
Average rainfall mm (inches)	51.9 (2.04)	33.3 (1.31)	33.7 (1.33)	44.5 (1.75)	49.6 (1.95)	60.7 (2.39)	58.6 (2.31)	77.2 (3.04)	116.8 (4.60)	149.6 (5.89)	79.8 (3.14)	49.6 (1.95)	805.3 (31.7)
Average snowfall cm (inches)	85.6 (33.7)	36.1 (14.2)	16.4 (6.5)	3.5 (1.4)	0.4 (0.2)	0 (0)	0 (0)	0 (0)	0 (0)	6.5 (2.6)	57.2 (22.5)	81.0 (31.9)	286.7 (113)
Average precipitation days (≥ 0.2 mm)	19.4	14.0	14.3	13.9	15.6	14.4	14.3	14.8	17.9	21.3	19.0	20.3	199.2
Average rainy days (≥ 0.2 mm)	7.9	6.8	10.4	13.2	15.5	14.4	14.3	14.8	17.9	20.8	11.8	8.4	156.2
Average snowy days (≥ 0.2 cm)	14.1	9.3	6.0	1.7	0.04	0	0	0	0	1.5	11.1	15.2	58.94
Source: Environment Canada
