= Atchelitz =

Coordinates: 49°07′00″N 122°01′00″W

Atchelitz is a rural community within the City of Chilliwack in the Eastern Fraser Valley region of British Columbia, Canada. It is located southwest of the city core, to the north of the Vedder Canal.

Atchelitz Pioneer Village, located within Atchelitz community, is a little antique town operating as a museum, located right next to Tourism Chilliwack and Chilliwack Heritage Museum. It is run entirely by volunteers from Atchelitz Threshermen’s Association. Atchelitz' collectors are mainly focused on collecting and restoring steam and gasoline stationary engines, steam and gasoline tractors and machinery used for farming.

== See also ==
- Aitchelitch 9
