= Ceepeecee, British Columbia =

Coordinates: 49.874°N 126.712°W

Ceepeecee (/ˌsiːpiːˈsiː/) (from the initials CPC for the Canadian Packing Corporation), on the west coast of Vancouver Island, near Nootka Island, was the site of a sardine cannery from about 1926 to about 1951. The cannery was built after large quantities of sardines (pilchard) were found in the area. The cannery was abandoned after the local sardine population disappeared. The nearest populated places are Tahsis and Zeballos.
