= Hupel, British Columbia =

Settlement in British Columbia, Canada

Coordinates: 50°37′N 118°46′W

Hupel is a settlement in the Regional District of North Okanagan in British Columbia, Canada.

== Description ==
Hupel is located near Shuswap River. Google maps indicates Hupel's postal code is V0E 1V5.
