= Kilgard, Abbotsford =

Kilgard
- Location of Kilgard in British Columbia
- Coordinates: 49°03′28″N 122°11′57″W
- Country: Canada
- Province: British Columbia
- Area codes: 604, 778

Kilgard is a neighbourhood of Abbotsford, British Columbia, Canada, located a few kilometres east of that city's core, on the north side of the Trans-Canada Highway at the foot of Sumas Mountain. The community and its name are connected with a former brickworks at the site, which produced a good quality fire brick; it was a sister community to Clayburn, which is nearby on the northwest side of Sumas Mountain, which also had a clay mine and brickworks. The Upper Sumas 6 Indian reserve of the Sumas First Nation is located at Kilgard.

== See also ==
- List of communities in British Columbia
