= Goodlow, British Columbia =

Goodlow
- Unincorporated community
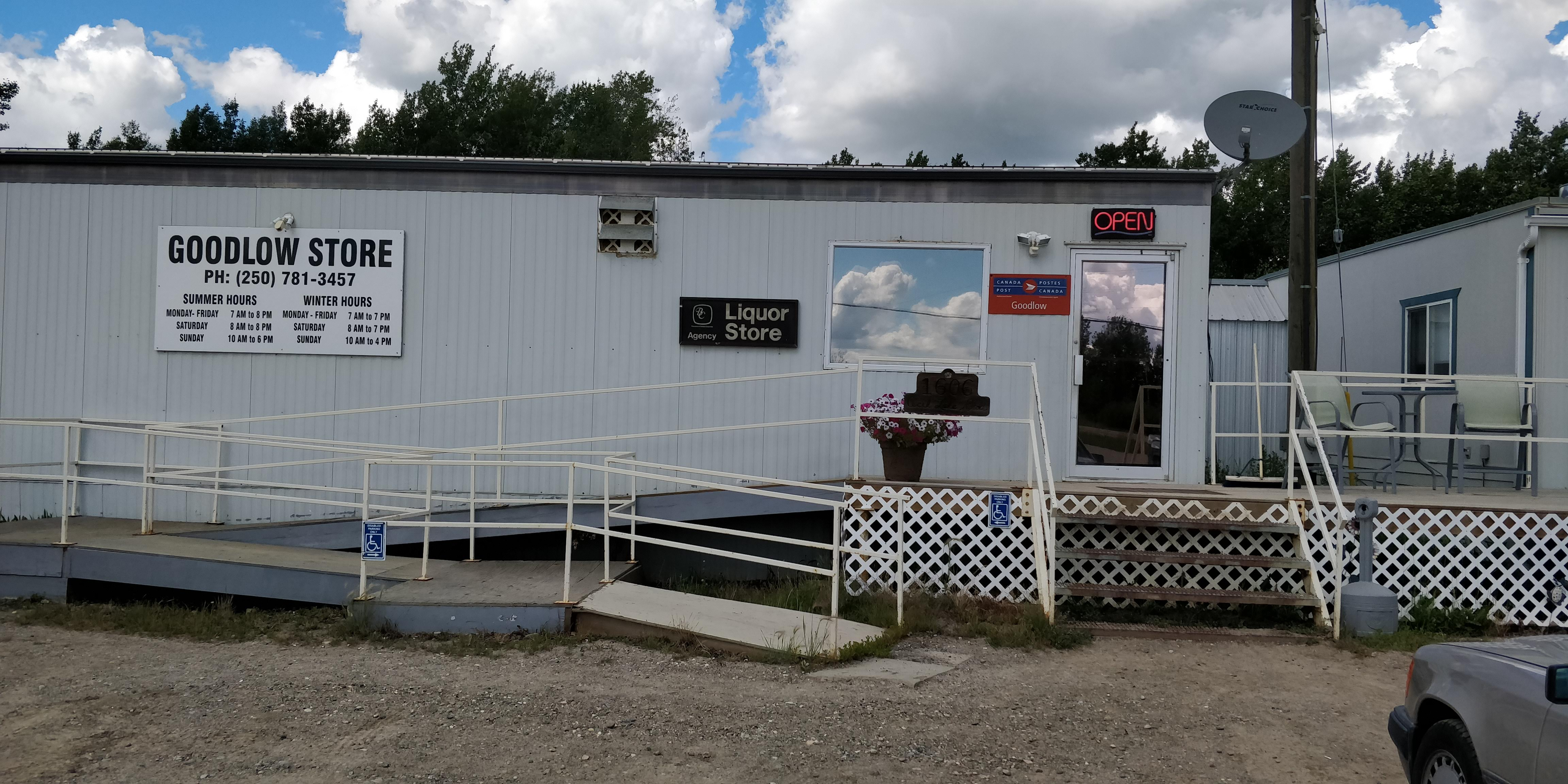
- Store and post office

- Location within British Columbia
- Coordinates: 56°20′00″N 120°08′00″W
- Country: Canada
- Province: British Columbia
- Federal riding: Prince George—Peace River—Northern Rockies
- Provincial riding: Peace River North
- Postal code: V0C 1S0

Goodlow is a settlement in the Peace River Country of British Columbia, located west of Boundary Lake.

== See also ==
- List of communities in British Columbia
