= Alkali Lake, British Columbia =

Alkali Lake
- Location of Alkali Lake in British Columbia
- Coordinates: 51°47′00″N 122°14′00″W
- Country: Canada
- Province: British Columbia
- Time zone: UTC−07:00 (PT)
- Area codes: 250, 778

Alkali Lake is an unincorporated community in the Cariboo region of the Central Interior of British Columbia, Canada, located 40 kilometers south of the city of Williams Lake en route to Dog Creek and the Gang Ranch, at about 780 m (2560 ft) above sea level. The settlement, and the adjoining reserves of the Alkali Lake Indian Band, get their name from Alkali Lake, which gets its name from an outcrop of alkali on the hillside above it; the lake itself is not an alkali lake.

The economy of the area is based on cattle ranching and small scale tourism, although in the past it was important as a way station on one of the various trails to the Cariboo goldfields farther north. Alkali Lake Indian Reserve No. 1, one of the main reserves of the Alkali Lake Indian Band, is located within the community. Most other reserves of the band are located to its east.

A documentary feature film about the community, "Honour of All: The Story of Alkali Lake", was produced Phil Lucas in 1985.

The subdistrict of Alkali Lake had a population of 534 in 1891.

== In popular culture ==
Alkali Lake appears in the fictional universe of Marvel Comics as the site of the Weapon X research facility, which serves as either an origin site or major story arc location for multiple Marvel Comics characters. The Weapon X facility is best known as the site where Wolverine was subjected to the adamantium-bonding process that fused the fictional alloy to his bones, as well as the site where Sabretooth and Deadpool unlocked their latent mutant abilities through extensive experimentation. Various other characters have also had story arcs that placed them within the halls of the facility. While the main Weapon X characters date back to World War II, the site is still operational in the modern day and continues to perform experiments on various metahumans.
