= Rolla, British Columbia =

Rolla
- Unincorporated place
- Location of Rolla in British Columbia
- Coordinates: 55.899°N 120.143°W
- Country: Canada
- Province: British Columbia
- Region: Peace River Country
- Regional district: Peace River

Area
  - Land: 0.32 km^{2} (0.12 sq mi)

Population (2021)
  - Total: 95
  - Density: 294.4/km^{2} (762/sq mi)
- Postal Codes: V0C 2G0
- Area codes: 250, 778, 236, & 672

Rolla is a settlement located in British Columbia, Canada. It is located in the Peace River Regional District about 9 kilometres (5 1/2 mi) west of the Alberta border or 23 kilometres (14 mi) north of Dawson Creek.

== History ==
Rolla was founded in 1914 with the establishment of a post office by Lea Miller, who had arrived with his family two years earlier to claim a homestead. The postman suggested the name of his hometown, Rolla, Missouri, as the name for the settlement. Rolla itself had been founded by residents of Raleigh, the capital of North Carolina (pronounced "Rolla" with a Southern accent). Miller was the first of a wave of agricultural settlers to arrive in Rolla between 1912 and 1914, preceded by Tremblay, a trapper who traded with the local Indigenous people. During those three years, a school, a store, and a Methodist church were established, and a nurse served the area. Access to the region was provided either via the Edson Trail from Grande Prairie, Alberta or the Peace River.

In the interwar period, in 1930, Charles Kitchen created a weekly local news magazine in Rolla, the Peace River Block News; however, it moved to Dawson Creek in 1932 after the arrival of the railway.
