= Darfield, British Columbia =

Coordinates: 51°18′00″N 120°11′00″W

Darfield is an unincorporated rural community a few miles south of Little Fort, British Columbia, Canada in the Thompson Country along the North Thompson River.
