= List of designated places in British Columbia =

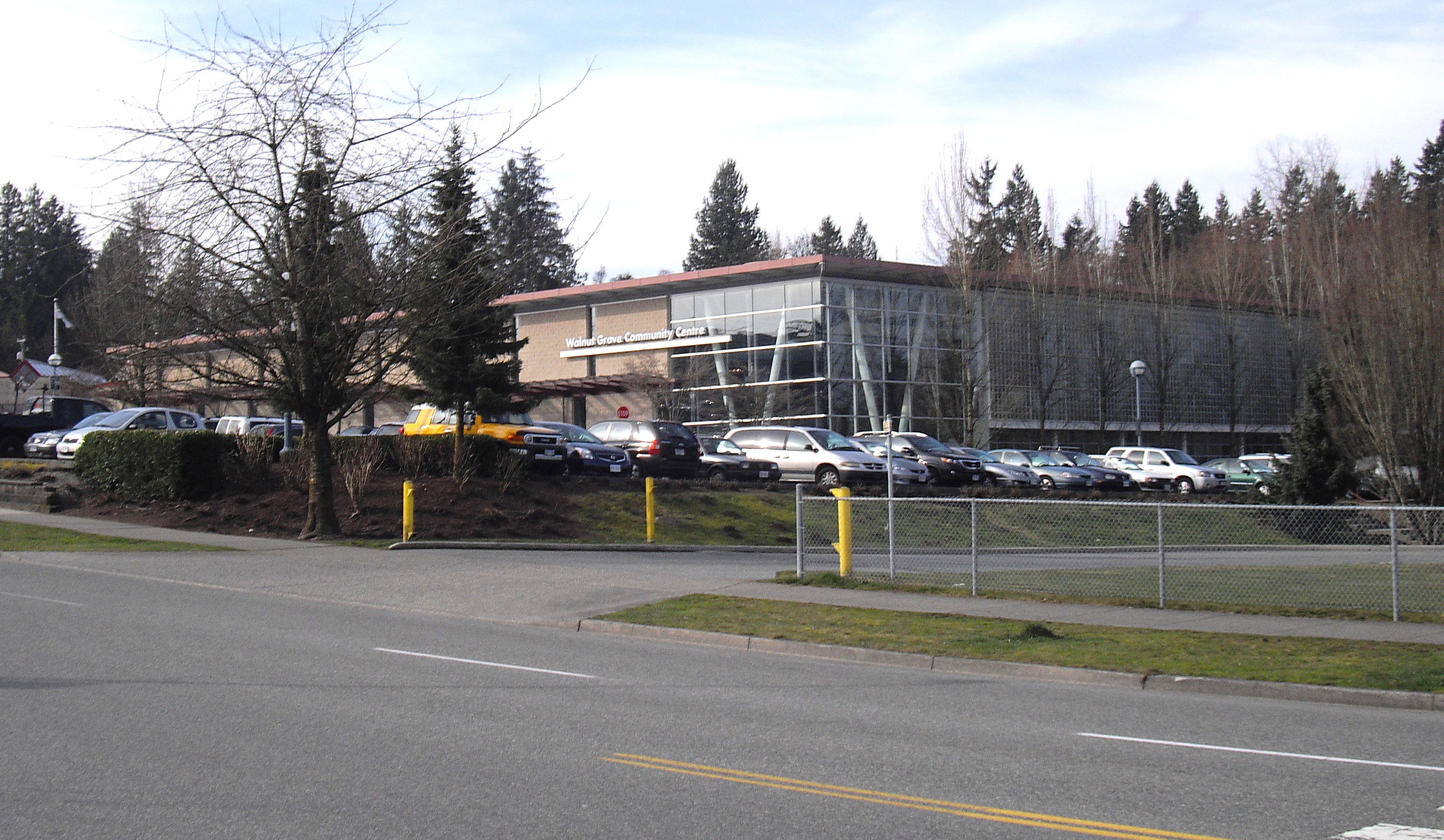
Walnut Grove Community Centre in Walnut Grove, British Columbia's most populous designated place

A designated place is a type of geographic unit used by Statistics Canada to disseminate census data. It is usually "a small community that does not meet the criteria used to define incorporated municipalities or Statistics Canada population centres (areas with a population of at least 1,000 and no fewer than 400 persons per square kilometre)." Provincial and territorial authorities collaborate with Statistics Canada in the creation of designated places so that data can be published for sub-areas within municipalities. Starting in 2016, Statistics Canada allowed the overlapping of designated places with population centres.

In the 2021 Census of Population, British Columbia had 332 designated places, an increase from 326 in 2016. Designated place types in British Columbia include 55 Indian reserves, 13 island trusts, 5 Nisga'a villages, 5 retired population centres, and 254 unincorporated places. In 2021, the 332 designated places had a cumulative population of 258,060 and an average population of 777. British Columbia's largest designated place is Walnut Grove with a population of 28,420.

== List ==
List of designated places in British Columbia
| Name | Type | Regional district | 2021 Census of Population | | | | |
| Name | Type | Regional district | Population (2021) | Population (2016) | Change (%) | Land area (km^{2}) | Population density (per km^{2}) |
|---|---|---|---|---|---|---|---|
| 103 Mile | Unincorporated place | Cariboo | 538 | 576 | −6.6% | 2.8 | 192.1/km^{2} |
| 150 Mile House | Unincorporated place | Cariboo | 1,132 | 1,138 | −0.5% | 18.82 | 60.1/km^{2} |
| Ainsworth | Unincorporated place | Central Kootenay | 20 | 20 | 0.0% | 0.57 | 35.1/km^{2} |
| Aiyansh (Kitladamas) 1 | Nisga'a village | Kitimat-Stikine | 0 | 0 | NA | 14.51 | 0.0/km^{2} |
| Alert Bay 1 | Indian reserve | Mount Waddington | 144 | 208 | −30.8% | 0.84 | 171.4/km^{2} |
| Alert Bay 1A | Indian reserve | Mount Waddington | 238 | 252 | −5.6% | 1.66 | 143.4/km^{2} |
| Alexandria 1 | Indian reserve | Cariboo | NA | 15 | NA | 1.22 | NA |
| Alexandria 1A | Indian reserve | Cariboo | NA | 0 | NA | 1.06 | NA |
| Alexandria 3 | Indian reserve | Cariboo | NA | 20 | NA | 5.75 | NA |
| Alexandria 3A | Indian reserve | Cariboo | NA | 5 | NA | 1.28 | NA |
| Alexis Creek | Unincorporated place | Cariboo | 53 | 101 | −47.5% | 1.91 | 27.7/km^{2} |
| Anahim Lake | Unincorporated place | Cariboo | 73 | 82 | −11.0% | 6.52 | 11.2/km^{2} |
| Anahim's Meadow 2 | Indian reserve | Cariboo | 5 | 10 | −50.0% | 2.64 | 1.9/km^{2} |
| Anahim's Meadow 2A | Indian reserve | Cariboo | 5 | 0 | NA | 1.55 | 3.2/km^{2} |
| Anderson Subdivision | Unincorporated place | Cariboo | 248 | 268 | −7.5% | 1.31 | 189.3/km^{2} |
| Anglemont | Unincorporated place | Columbia-Shuswap | 613 | 472 | +29.9% | 5.66 | 108.3/km^{2} |
| Arbutus Ridge | Unincorporated place | Cowichan Valley | 1,085 | 1,063 | +2.1% | 1.48 | 733.1/km^{2} |
| Arras-Devereaux | Unincorporated place | Peace River | 133 | 226 | −41.2% | 14.06 | 9.5/km^{2} |
| Baker Trails | Unincorporated place | Fraser Valley | 565 | 581 | −2.8% | 1.78 | 317.4/km^{2} |
| Balfour | Unincorporated place | Central Kootenay | 493 | 459 | +7.4% | 3.72 | 132.5/km^{2} |
| Bamfield | Unincorporated place | Alberni-Clayoquot | 201 | 179 | +12.3% | 4.86 | 41.4/km^{2} |
| Barlow Creek part A | Unincorporated place | Cariboo | 590 | 573 | +3.0% | 12.57 | 46.9/km^{2} |
| Barlow Creek part B | Unincorporated place | Cariboo | 5 | 0 | NA | 0.6 | 8.3/km^{2} |
| Barney's Bar | Unincorporated place | qathet | 508 | 442 | +14.9% | 2.8 | 181.4/km^{2} |
| Barriere | Unincorporated place | Thompson-Nicola | 1,391 | 1,283 | +8.4% | 5.53 | 251.5/km^{2} |
| Bear Lake | Unincorporated place | Fraser-Fort George | 152 | 151 | +0.7% | 1.51 | 100.7/km^{2} |
| Beaverdell | Unincorporated place | Kootenay Boundary | 122 | 151 | −19.2% | 3.99 | 30.6/km^{2} |
| Bell Acres | Unincorporated place | Fraser Valley | 604 | 576 | +4.9% | 7.8 | 77.4/km^{2} |
| Bella Coola | Unincorporated place | Central Coast | 162 | 148 | +9.5% | 1.96 | 82.7/km^{2} |
| Big Lake | Unincorporated place | Cariboo | 351 | 323 | +8.7% | 41.11 | 8.5/km^{2} |
| Big White | Unincorporated place | Kootenay Boundary | 991 | 251 | +294.8% | 8.6 | 115.2/km^{2} |
| Birken | Unincorporated place | Squamish-Lilooet | 281 | 253 | +11.1% | 14.63 | 19.2/km^{2} |
| Black Creek - Oyster River | Unincorporated place | Comox Valley | 2,080 | 1,995 | +4.3% | 71.84 | 29.0/km^{2} |
| Black Point | Unincorporated place | qathet | 559 | 580 | −3.6% | 1.62 | 345.1/km^{2} |
| Black Tusk Village | Unincorporated place | Squamish-Lilooet | 235 | 175 | +34.3% | 2.32 | 101.3/km^{2} |
| Blind Bay | Unincorporated place | Columbia-Shuswap | 1,576 | 1,315 | +19.8% | 16.76 | 94.0/km^{2} |
| Blue River | Unincorporated place | Thompson-Nicola | 175 | 157 | +11.5% | 7.67 | 22.8/km^{2} |
| Bonnington | Unincorporated place | Central Kootenay | 555 | 543 | +2.2% | 2.47 | 224.7/km^{2} |
| Boston Bar | Unincorporated place | Fraser Valley | 166 | 190 | −12.6% | 1.89 | 87.8/km^{2} |
| Bralorne | Unincorporated place | Squamish-Lilooet | 59 | 36 | +63.9% | 0.23 | 256.5/km^{2} |
| Brent Road - Trepanier | Unincorporated place | Central Okanagan | 297 | 289 | +2.8% | 26.88 | 11.0/km^{2} |
| Brew Bay | Unincorporated place | qathet | 109 | 94 | +16.0% | 0.34 | 320.6/km^{2} |
| Bridal Falls | Unincorporated place | Fraser Valley | 382 | 147 | +159.9% | 7.94 | 48.1/km^{2} |
| Brilliant | Unincorporated place | Central Kootenay | 151 | 157 | −3.8% | 0.94 | 160.6/km^{2} |
| Britannia Beach | Unincorporated place | Squamish-Lilooet | 384 | 373 | +2.9% | 3.99 | 96.2/km^{2} |
| Buckley Bay | Unincorporated place | Comox Valley | 228 | 204 | +11.8% | 3.46 | 65.9/km^{2} |
| Burton | Unincorporated place | Central Kootenay | 132 | 111 | +18.9% | 2.86 | 46.2/km^{2} |
| BX/Silver Star Foothills | Unincorporated place | North Okanagan | 1,226 | 1,097 | +11.8% | 15.19 | 80.7/km^{2} |
| Canoe Point | Unincorporated place | Columbia-Shuswap | 109 | 58 | +87.9% | 9.15 | 11.9/km^{2} |
| Canyon Alpine | Unincorporated place | Fraser Valley | 72 | 81 | −11.1% | 1.95 | 36.9/km^{2} |
| Casino | Unincorporated place | Kootenay Boundary | 87 | 80 | +8.7% | 4.35 | 20.0/km^{2} |
| Cassidy | Unincorporated place | Nanaimo | 1,039 | 995 | +4.4% | 7.65 | 135.8/km^{2} |
| Cawston | Unincorporated place | Okanagan-Similkameen | 1,040 | 956 | +8.8% | 11.68 | 89.0/km^{2} |
| Cedar | Unincorporated place | Nanaimo | 3,078 | 2,836 | +8.5% | 33.73 | 91.3/km^{2} |
| Cedar Hill/Glenemma | Unincorporated place | Columbia-Shuswap | 621 | 583 | +6.5% | 38.75 | 16.0/km^{2} |
| Celista | Unincorporated place | Columbia-Shuswap | 544 | 433 | +25.6% | 26.49 | 20.5/km^{2} |
| Charlie Lake part A | Unincorporated place | Peace River | 1,717 | 1,856 | −7.5% | 19.31 | 88.9/km^{2} |
| Charlie Lake part B | Unincorporated place | Peace River | 35 | 41 | −14.6% | 0.23 | 152.2/km^{2} |
| Cherry Creek part A | Unincorporated place | Alberni-Clayoquot | 1,013 | 1,015 | −0.2% | 12.91 | 78.5/km^{2} |
| Cherry Point | Unincorporated place | Cowichan Valley | 506 | 582 | −13.1% | 0.89 | 568.5/km^{2} |
| Cherryville | Unincorporated place | North Okanagan | 717 | 695 | +3.2% | 42.01 | 17.1/km^{2} |
| Chetwynd | Retired population centre | Peace River | 1,917 | 2,155 | −11.0% | 10.55 | 181.7/km^{2} |
| Chilcotin Road Area | Unincorporated place | Cariboo | 327 | 374 | −12.6% | 2.01 | 162.7/km^{2} |
| Christina Lake | Unincorporated place | Kootenay Boundary | 1,329 | 1,099 | +20.9% | 10.72 | 124.0/km^{2} |
| Chuchhriaschin 5 | Indian reserve | Thompson-Nicola | 0 | 0 | NA | 0.08 | 0.0/km^{2} |
| Chuchhriaschin 5A | Indian reserve | Thompson-Nicola | 0 | 0 | NA | 0.09 | 0.0/km^{2} |
| Coal Harbour | Unincorporated place | Mount Waddington | 174 | 139 | +25.2% | 5.3 | 32.8/km^{2} |
| Cobble Hill | Unincorporated place | Cowichan Valley | 972 | 955 | +1.8% | 1.48 | 656.8/km^{2} |
| Columbia Valley | Unincorporated place | Fraser Valley | 257 | 266 | −3.4% | 10.4 | 24.7/km^{2} |
| Commodore Heights | Unincorporated place | Cariboo | 49 | 50 | −2.0% | 1.92 | 25.5/km^{2} |
| Coombs | Unincorporated place | Nanaimo | 1,672 | 1,612 | +3.7% | 15.57 | 107.4/km^{2} |
| Cowichan 1 | Indian reserve | Cowichan Valley | 2,405 | 2,046 | +17.5% | 22.96 | 104.7/km^{2} |
| Cowichan 9 | Indian reserve | Cowichan Valley | 15 | 20 | −25.0% | 0.19 | 78.9/km^{2} |
| Cowichan Bay | Unincorporated place | Cowichan Valley | 410 | 358 | +14.5% | 0.66 | 621.2/km^{2} |
| Crawford Bay | Unincorporated place | Central Kootenay | 326 | 304 | +7.2% | 13.27 | 24.6/km^{2} |
| Cultus Lake North | Unincorporated place | Fraser Valley | 1,217 | 1,108 | +9.8% | 3.35 | 363.3/km^{2} |
| Cultus Lake South | Unincorporated place | Fraser Valley | 792 | 305 | +159.7% | 1.89 | 419.0/km^{2} |
| D'Arcy | Unincorporated place | Squamish-Lilooet | 35 | 43 | −18.6% | 0.1 | 350.0/km^{2} |
| Dashwood | Unincorporated place | Nanaimo | 1,055 | 982 | +7.4% | 11.02 | 95.7/km^{2} |
| Dease Lake | Unincorporated place | Kitimat-Stikine | 229 | 335 | −31.6% | 8.49 | 27.0/km^{2} |
| Decker Lake | Unincorporated place | Bulkley-Nechako | 157 | 149 | +5.4% | 1.64 | 95.7/km^{2} |
| Deep Bay/Bowser | Unincorporated place | Nanaimo | 1,864 | 1,729 | +7.8% | 26.71 | 69.8/km^{2} |
| Deep Cove | Retired population centre | Capital | 1,177 | 1,081 | +8.9% | 1.45 | 811.7/km^{2} |
| Deep Creek | Unincorporated place | Columbia-Shuswap | 708 | 557 | +27.1% | 42.58 | 16.6/km^{2} |
| Denman Island Trust Area | Island trust | Comox Valley | 1,391 | 1,165 | +19.4% | 51.5 | 27.0/km^{2} |
| Deroche | Unincorporated place | Fraser Valley | 141 | 187 | −24.6% | 4.21 | 33.5/km^{2} |
| Devine | Unincorporated place | Squamish-Lilooet | 58 | 58 | 0.0% | 6.06 | 9.6/km^{2} |
| Dewdney | Unincorporated place | Fraser Valley | 493 | 550 | −10.4% | 10.54 | 46.8/km^{2} |
| Diamond | Unincorporated place | Cowichan Valley | 246 | 200 | +23.0% | 1.05 | 234.3/km^{2} |
| Dodge Cove | Unincorporated place | North Coast | 40 | 31 | +29.0% | 0.29 | 137.9/km^{2} |
| Dog Creek Road Area | Unincorporated place | Cariboo | 819 | 1,088 | −24.7% | 7.76 | 105.5/km^{2} |
| Dogwood Valley | Unincorporated place | Fraser Valley | 211 | 175 | +20.6% | 4.76 | 44.3/km^{2} |
| Dokie-Wildmare | Unincorporated place | Peace River | 590 | 614 | −3.9% | 18.25 | 32.3/km^{2} |
| Dunsmuir | Unincorporated place | Nanaimo | 1,497 | 1,330 | +12.6% | 21.33 | 70.2/km^{2} |
| Durieu | Unincorporated place | Fraser Valley | 400 | 340 | +17.6% | 10.28 | 38.9/km^{2} |
| Eagle Bay | Unincorporated place | Columbia-Shuswap | 557 | 428 | +30.1% | 32.65 | 17.1/km^{2} |
| East Sahtlam | Unincorporated place | Cowichan Valley | 1,080 | 934 | +15.6% | 8.97 | 120.4/km^{2} |
| East Wellington | Unincorporated place | Nanaimo | 1,704 | 1,444 | +18.0% | 16.94 | 100.6/km^{2} |
| Edgewater | Unincorporated place | East Kootenay | 720 | 613 | +17.5% | 10.22 | 70.5/km^{2} |
| Edgewood | Unincorporated place | Central Kootenay | 235 | 236 | −0.4% | 2.06 | 114.1/km^{2} |
| Ellison | Unincorporated place | Central Okanagan | 3,316 | 3,084 | +7.5% | 81.72 | 40.6/km^{2} |
| Englishman River North | Unincorporated place | Nanaimo | 964 | 746 | +29.2% | 2.15 | 448.4/km^{2} |
| Englishman River South | Unincorporated place | Nanaimo | 746 | 748 | −0.3% | 9.41 | 79.3/km^{2} |
| Errington | Unincorporated place | Nanaimo | 2,907 | 2,677 | +8.6% | 27.44 | 105.9/km^{2} |
| Esler Subdivision | Unincorporated place | Cariboo | 214 | 252 | −15.1% | 3.92 | 54.6/km^{2} |
| Evelyn | Unincorporated place | Bulkley-Nechako | 65 | 67 | −3.0% | 2.16 | 30.1/km^{2} |
| Extension | Unincorporated place | Nanaimo | 323 | 271 | +19.2% | 1.14 | 283.3/km^{2} |
| Fairmont Hot Springs | Unincorporated place | East Kootenay | 781 | 571 | +36.8% | 9.3 | 84.0/km^{2} |
| Falkland | Unincorporated place | North Okanagan | 946 | 878 | +7.7% | 27.69 | 34.2/km^{2} |
| Fanny Bay | Unincorporated place | Comox Valley | 921 | 893 | +3.1% | 7.4 | 124.5/km^{2} |
| Fauquier | Unincorporated place | Central Kootenay | 142 | 118 | +20.3% | 4.85 | 29.3/km^{2} |
| Fernie Alpine Resort | Unincorporated place | East Kootenay | 165 | 107 | +54.2% | 2.54 | 65.0/km^{2} |
| Field | Unincorporated place | Columbia-Shuswap | 157 | 230 | −31.7% | 3.53 | 44.5/km^{2} |
| Forest Grove | Unincorporated place | Cariboo | 338 | 295 | +14.6% | 16.08 | 21.0/km^{2} |
| Fort Fraser | Unincorporated place | Bulkley-Nechako | 220 | 275 | −20.0% | 2.43 | 90.5/km^{2} |
| Fort St. John Airport | Unincorporated place | Peace River | 509 | 468 | +8.8% | 12.09 | 42.1/km^{2} |
| Fox Mountain | Unincorporated place | Cariboo | 637 | 597 | +6.7% | 21.3 | 29.9/km^{2} |
| French Creek | Unincorporated place | Nanaimo | 1,107 | 1,024 | +8.1% | 16.03 | 69.1/km^{2} |
| Fruitvale | Retired population centre | Kootenay Boundary | 3,557 | 3,491 | +1.9% | 6.01 | 591.8/km^{2} |
| Furry Creek | Unincorporated place | Squamish-Lilooet | 270 | 254 | +6.3% | 4.07 | 66.3/km^{2} |
| Gabriola Island Trust Area | Island trust | Nanaimo | 4,500 | 4,033 | +11.6% | 58.12 | 77.4/km^{2} |
| Galiano Island Trust Area | Island trust | Capital | 1,396 | 1,044 | +33.7% | 60.13 | 23.2/km^{2} |
| Gambier Island Trust Area | Island trust | Sunshine Coast | 430 | 247 | +74.1% | 98.02 | 4.4/km^{2} |
| Garden 2 | Indian reserve | Cariboo | NA | 0 | NA | 0.35 | NA |
| Garden 2A | Indian reserve | Cariboo | NA | 5 | NA | 1.69 | NA |
| Garden Bay | Unincorporated place | Sunshine Coast | 395 | 364 | +8.5% | 2.51 | 157.4/km^{2} |
| Gateway/Buffalo Creek | Unincorporated place | Cariboo | 610 | 617 | −1.1% | 51.22 | 11.9/km^{2} |
| Genelle | Unincorporated place | Kootenay Boundary | 756 | 770 | −1.8% | 4.37 | 173.0/km^{2} |
| Gillies Bay | Unincorporated place | qathet | 428 | 441 | −2.9% | 4.87 | 87.9/km^{2} |
| Gingolx | Nisga'a village | Kitimat-Stikine | 367 | 374 | −1.9% | 5.17 | 71.0/km^{2} |
| Gitwinksihlkw | Nisga'a village | Kitimat-Stikine | 207 | 211 | −1.9% | 3.88 | 53.4/km^{2} |
| Glade | Unincorporated place | Central Kootenay | 319 | 289 | +10.4% | 3.2 | 99.7/km^{2} |
| Gold Bridge | Unincorporated place | Squamish-Lilooet | 30 | 25 | +20.0% | 0.19 | 157.9/km^{2} |
| Grand Haven/Clairmont | Unincorporated place | Peace River | 560 | 735 | −23.8% | 3.86 | 145.1/km^{2} |
| Grindrod | Unincorporated place | North Okanagan | 1,526 | 1,470 | +3.8% | 43.23 | 35.3/km^{2} |
| Gun Lake | Unincorporated place | Squamish-Lilooet | 98 | 40 | +145.0% | 4.15 | 23.6/km^{2} |
| Hagensborg part A | Unincorporated place | Central Coast | 191 | 174 | +9.8% | 4.49 | 42.5/km^{2} |
| Hagensborg part B | Unincorporated place | Central Coast | 82 | 82 | 0.0% | 2.65 | 30.9/km^{2} |
| Halfmoon Bay | Unincorporated place | Sunshine Coast | 505 | 450 | +12.2% | 4.02 | 125.6/km^{2} |
| Halhalaeden 14 | Indian reserve | Thompson-Nicola | 10 | 5 | +100.0% | 0.53 | 18.9/km^{2} |
| Halhalaeden 14A | Indian reserve | Thompson-Nicola | 0 | 0 | NA | 1.13 | 0.0/km^{2} |
| Harrison Mills | Unincorporated place | Fraser Valley | 589 | 484 | +21.7% | 6.89 | 85.5/km^{2} |
| Harrop/Procter | Unincorporated place | Central Kootenay | 568 | 589 | −3.6% | 19.77 | 28.7/km^{2} |
| Hatzic Island | Unincorporated place | Fraser Valley | 561 | 522 | +7.5% | 1.01 | 555.4/km^{2} |
| Hatzic Prairie | Unincorporated place | Fraser Valley | 409 | 419 | −2.4% | 10.35 | 39.5/km^{2} |
| Hedley | Unincorporated place | Okanagan-Similkameen | 261 | 242 | +7.9% | 0.57 | 457.9/km^{2} |
| Hemlock Valley | Unincorporated place | Fraser Valley | 82 | 48 | +70.8% | 8.79 | 9.3/km^{2} |
| Heriot Bay | Unincorporated place | Strathcona | 594 | 574 | +3.5% | 3.52 | 168.8/km^{2} |
| Hilliers | Unincorporated place | Nanaimo | 1,590 | 1,540 | +3.2% | 29.05 | 54.7/km^{2} |
| Hixon | Unincorporated place | Cariboo | 239 | 277 | −13.7% | 2.48 | 96.4/km^{2} |
| Holberg | Unincorporated place | Mount Waddington | 15 | 35 | −57.1% | 7.15 | 2.1/km^{2} |
| Honeymoon Bay/Mesachie Lake | Unincorporated place | Cowichan Valley | 632 | 561 | +12.7% | 4 | 158.0/km^{2} |
| Hornby Island Trust Area | Island trust | Comox Valley | 1,225 | 1,016 | +20.6% | 29.95 | 40.9/km^{2} |
| Horsefly | Unincorporated place | Cariboo | 173 | 186 | −7.0% | 6.19 | 27.9/km^{2} |
| Hosmer | Unincorporated place | East Kootenay | 234 | 198 | +18.2% | 1.72 | 136.0/km^{2} |
| Hyde Creek | Unincorporated place | Mount Waddington | 527 | 544 | −3.1% | 11.91 | 44.2/km^{2} |
| Imperial Ranchettes | Unincorporated place | Cariboo | 412 | 441 | −6.6% | 3.38 | 121.9/km^{2} |
| Inkluckcheen 21 | Indian reserve | Thompson-Nicola | 190 | 156 | +21.8% | 2.43 | 78.2/km^{2} |
| Inkluckcheen 21B | Indian reserve | Thompson-Nicola | 0 | 0 | NA | 1.9 | 0.0/km^{2} |
| Jaffray | Unincorporated place | East Kootenay | 510 | 564 | −9.6% | 6.89 | 74.0/km^{2} |
| Kaleden | Unincorporated place | Okanagan-Similkameen | 1,186 | 1,203 | −1.4% | 4.31 | 275.2/km^{2} |
| Kanaka Bar 1A | Indian reserve | Thompson-Nicola | 0 | 15 | −100.0% | 0.7 | 0.0/km^{2} |
| Kanaka Bar 2 | Indian reserve | Thompson-Nicola | 0 | 0 | NA | 0.46 | 0.0/km^{2} |
| Kelly Lake | Unincorporated place | Peace River | 76 | 76 | 0.0% | 10.57 | 7.2/km^{2} |
| Kersley | Unincorporated place | Cariboo | 406 | 364 | +11.5% | 4.27 | 95.1/km^{2} |
| Kettle Valley | Unincorporated place | Kootenay Boundary | 236 | 244 | −3.3% | 7.4 | 31.9/km^{2} |
| Kingfisher | Unincorporated place | North Okanagan | 332 | 205 | +62.0% | 10.66 | 31.1/km^{2} |
| Kitchener | Unincorporated place | Central Kootenay | 242 | 269 | −10.0% | 6.29 | 38.5/km^{2} |
| Lac la Hache | Unincorporated place | Cariboo | 281 | 258 | +8.9% | 4.49 | 62.6/km^{2} |
| Laidlaw | Unincorporated place | Fraser Valley | 173 | 219 | −21.0% | 10.45 | 16.6/km^{2} |
| Lake Errock | Unincorporated place | Fraser Valley | 343 | 425 | −19.3% | 8.65 | 39.7/km^{2} |
| Lakeview | Unincorporated place | Central Okanagan | 1,847 | 1,600 | +15.4% | 25.06 | 73.7/km^{2} |
| Lang Bay | Unincorporated place | qathet | 285 | 288 | −1.0% | 1.51 | 188.7/km^{2} |
| Lantzville | Unincorporated place | Nanaimo | 772 | 736 | +4.9% | 4.02 | 192.0/km^{2} |
| Lasqueti Island Trust Area | Island trust | qathet | 498 | 399 | +24.8% | 73.32 | 6.8/km^{2} |
| Laxgalts'ap | Nisga'a village | Kitimat-Stikine | 248 | 376 | −34.0% | 17.52 | 14.2/km^{2} |
| Lee Creek | Unincorporated place | Columbia-Shuswap | 503 | 394 | +27.7% | 6.69 | 75.2/km^{2} |
| Little Springs 18 | Indian reserve | Cariboo | 5 | 10 | −50.0% | 2.79 | 1.8/km^{2} |
| Little Springs 8 | Indian reserve | Cariboo | 15 | 5 | +200.0% | 1.92 | 7.8/km^{2} |
| Lone Butte | Unincorporated place | Cariboo | 285 | 285 | 0.0% | 16.87 | 16.9/km^{2} |
| Lower Nicola | Unincorporated place | Thompson-Nicola | 980 | 965 | +1.6% | 6.07 | 161.4/km^{2} |
| Lund | Unincorporated place | qathet | 292 | 246 | +18.7% | 5.18 | 56.4/km^{2} |
| Magna Bay | Unincorporated place | Columbia-Shuswap | 284 | 175 | +62.3% | 12.16 | 23.4/km^{2} |
| Malakwa | Unincorporated place | Columbia-Shuswap | 559 | 559 | 0.0% | 27.68 | 20.2/km^{2} |
| Manson's Landing | Unincorporated place | Strathcona | 158 | 149 | +6.0% | 2.19 | 72.1/km^{2} |
| Mara | Unincorporated place | North Okanagan | 400 | 297 | +34.7% | 13.49 | 29.7/km^{2} |
| Mayne Island Trust Area | Island trust | Capital | 1,304 | 949 | +37.4% | 22.35 | 58.3/km^{2} |
| McConnell Creek | Unincorporated place | Fraser Valley | 514 | 484 | +6.2% | 10.45 | 49.2/km^{2} |
| McLeese Lake | Unincorporated place | Cariboo | 234 | 148 | +58.1% | 6.56 | 35.7/km^{2} |
| Merville part A | Unincorporated place | Comox Valley | 1,386 | 1,292 | +7.3% | 28.69 | 48.3/km^{2} |
| Merville part B | Unincorporated place | Comox Valley | 852 | 837 | +1.8% | 15.73 | 54.2/km^{2} |
| Merville part C | Unincorporated place | Comox Valley | 103 | 111 | −7.2% | 3.57 | 28.9/km^{2} |
| Mile 108 Recreational Ranch | Unincorporated place | Cariboo | 2,597 | 2,577 | +0.8% | 20.41 | 127.2/km^{2} |
| Mile 62.5/63 | Unincorporated place | Peace River | 210 | 224 | −6.2% | 8.33 | 25.2/km^{2} |
| Mill Bay | Unincorporated place | Cowichan Valley | 3,027 | 2,881 | +5.1% | 6.74 | 449.1/km^{2} |
| Moberly Lake | Unincorporated place | Peace River | 193 | 197 | −2.0% | 36.8 | 5.2/km^{2} |
| Mount Baldy | Unincorporated place | Kootenay Boundary | 67 | 25 | +168.0% | 2.32 | 28.9/km^{2} |
| Mount Currie 1 | Indian reserve | Squamish-Lilooet | 114 | 129 | −11.6% | 0.82 | 139.0/km^{2} |
| Mount Currie 2 | Indian reserve | Squamish-Lilooet | 5 | 15 | −66.7% | 0.68 | 7.4/km^{2} |
| Mount Currie 6 | Indian reserve | Squamish-Lilooet | 958 | 961 | −0.3% | 18.45 | 51.9/km^{2} |
| Mount Currie 8 | Indian reserve | Squamish-Lilooet | 25 | 41 | −39.0% | 3.67 | 6.8/km^{2} |
| Mount Currie 10 | Indian reserve | Squamish-Lilooet | 140 | 139 | +0.7% | 0.43 | 325.6/km^{2} |
| Moyie (South) | Unincorporated place | East Kootenay | 266 | 176 | +51.1% | 6.53 | 40.7/km^{2} |
| Mud Bay | Unincorporated place | Metro Vancouver | 230 | 222 | +3.6% | 4.41 | 52.2/km^{2} |
| Myrtle Point | Unincorporated place | qathet | 537 | 529 | +1.5% | 4.27 | 125.8/km^{2} |
| Nanaimo River 2 | Indian reserve | Nanaimo | 37 | 20 | +85.0% | 0.54 | 68.5/km^{2} |
| Nanaimo River 3 | Indian reserve | Nanaimo | 67 | 92 | −27.2% | 0.94 | 71.3/km^{2} |
| Nanaimo River 4 | Indian reserve | Nanaimo | 219 | 259 | −15.4% | 0.81 | 270.4/km^{2} |
| Nanoose Bay | Unincorporated place | Nanaimo | 6,540 | 5,919 | +10.5% | 38.75 | 168.8/km^{2} |
| Naramata | Unincorporated place | Okanagan-Similkameen | 1,628 | 1,676 | −2.9% | 8.11 | 200.7/km^{2} |
| Nequatque 1 | Indian reserve | Squamish-Lilooet | 140 | 117 | +19.7% | 1.8 | 77.8/km^{2} |
| Nequatque 2 | Indian reserve | Squamish-Lilooet | 10 | 15 | −33.3% | 0.09 | 111.1/km^{2} |
| Nequatque 3A | Indian reserve | Squamish-Lilooet | 5 | 0 | NA | 0.08 | 62.5/km^{2} |
| Neskonlith 1 (Neskainlith 1) | Indian reserve | Thompson-Nicola | 109 | 95 | +14.7% | 14.5 | 7.5/km^{2} |
| Neskonlith 2 | Indian reserve | Thompson-Nicola | 170 | 142 | +19.7% | 10.23 | 16.6/km^{2} |
| New Aiyansh | Nisga'a village | Kitimat-Stikine | 749 | 737 | +1.6% | 2.68 | 279.5/km^{2} |
| North Bend | Unincorporated place | Fraser Valley | 107 | 93 | +15.1% | 7.78 | 13.8/km^{2} |
| North Lakeside | Unincorporated place | Cariboo | 270 | 276 | −2.2% | 3.35 | 80.6/km^{2} |
| North Oyster/Yellow Point | Unincorporated place | Cowichan Valley | 1,399 | 1,320 | +6.0% | 20.43 | 68.5/km^{2} |
| North Pender Island Trust Area | Island trust | Capital | 2,467 | 2,067 | +19.4% | 52.13 | 47.3/km^{2} |
| North Tacla Lake 7 | Indian reserve | Bulkley-Nechako | 214 | 155 | +38.1% | 0.77 | 277.9/km^{2} |
| North Tacla Lake 7A | Indian reserve | Bulkley-Nechako | 29 | 32 | −9.4% | 0.21 | 138.1/km^{2} |
| Notch Hill | Unincorporated place | Columbia-Shuswap | 754 | 674 | +11.9% | 36.69 | 20.6/km^{2} |
| Oasis | Unincorporated place | Kootenay Boundary | 111 | 111 | 0.0% | 1.31 | 84.7/km^{2} |
| Okanagan Falls | Unincorporated place | Okanagan-Similkameen | 2,266 | 2,230 | +1.6% | 3.82 | 593.2/km^{2} |
| Olalla | Unincorporated place | Okanagan-Similkameen | 415 | 378 | +9.8% | 0.49 | 846.9/km^{2} |
| Ootischenia | Unincorporated place | Central Kootenay | 1,320 | 1,080 | +22.2% | 7.74 | 170.5/km^{2} |
| Panorama Mountain Resort | Unincorporated place | East Kootenay | 122 | 134 | −9.0% | 2.67 | 45.7/km^{2} |
| Paterson | Unincorporated place | Kootenay Boundary | 75 | 75 | 0.0% | 10.98 | 6.8/km^{2} |
| Pine Valley | Unincorporated place | Cariboo | 182 | 204 | −10.8% | 1.22 | 149.2/km^{2} |
| Pinetree | Unincorporated place | qathet | 271 | 258 | +5.0% | 0.98 | 276.5/km^{2} |
| Popkum | Unincorporated place | Fraser Valley | 1,710 | 1,382 | +23.7% | 6.38 | 268.0/km^{2} |
| Port Renfrew | Unincorporated place | Capital | 262 | 144 | +81.9% | 8.68 | 30.2/km^{2} |
| Porteau Cove | Unincorporated place | Squamish-Lilooet | 0 | 0 | NA | 6.41 | 0.0/km^{2} |
| Prespatou | Unincorporated place | Peace River | 298 | 346 | −13.9% | 16.21 | 18.4/km^{2} |
| Qualicum Bay | Unincorporated place | Nanaimo | 454 | 438 | +3.7% | 11.81 | 38.4/km^{2} |
| Quathiaski Cove | Unincorporated place | Strathcona | 516 | 449 | +14.9% | 2.77 | 186.3/km^{2} |
| Quatsino | Unincorporated place | Mount Waddington | 58 | 43 | +34.9% | 8.12 | 7.1/km^{2} |
| Ranchero | Unincorporated place | Columbia-Shuswap | 1,008 | 959 | +5.1% | 19.28 | 52.3/km^{2} |
| Read Island | Unincorporated place | Strathcona | 76 | 66 | +15.2% | 57.1 | 1.3/km^{2} |
| Riondel | Unincorporated place | Central Kootenay | 266 | 253 | +5.1% | 0.7 | 380.0/km^{2} |
| Roberts Creek | Unincorporated place | Sunshine Coast | 1,949 | 1,867 | +4.4% | 20.94 | 93.1/km^{2} |
| Robson/Raspberry | Unincorporated place | Central Kootenay | 451 | 404 | +11.6% | 5.21 | 86.6/km^{2} |
| Rock Creek | Unincorporated place | Kootenay Boundary | 185 | 181 | +2.2% | 8.24 | 22.5/km^{2} |
| Rolla | Unincorporated place | Peace River | 95 | 103 | −7.8% | 0.32 | 296.9/km^{2} |
| Royston | Unincorporated place | Comox Valley | 2,791 | 2,611 | +6.9% | 18.31 | 152.4/km^{2} |
| Sachteen 2 | Indian reserve | Fraser Valley | 0 | 0 | NA | 0.07 | 0.0/km^{2} |
| Sachteen 2A | Indian reserve | Fraser Valley | 5 | 10 | −50.0% | 0.28 | 17.9/km^{2} |
| Saltair | Unincorporated place | Cowichan Valley | 2,114 | 2,069 | +2.2% | 6.78 | 311.8/km^{2} |
| Saltspring Island Trust Area | Island trust | Capital | 11,798 | 10,640 | +10.9% | 194.05 | 60.8/km^{2} |
| Sandspit | Unincorporated place | North Coast | 310 | 296 | +4.7% | 5.85 | 53.0/km^{2} |
| Saratoga-Miracle Beach | Unincorporated place | Comox Valley | 1,511 | 1,388 | +8.9% | 6.07 | 248.9/km^{2} |
| Saturna Island Trust Area | Island trust | Capital | 465 | 354 | +31.4% | 35.71 | 13.0/km^{2} |
| Savona | Unincorporated place | Thompson-Nicola | 519 | 538 | −3.5% | 3.89 | 133.4/km^{2} |
| Scotch Creek | Unincorporated place | Columbia-Shuswap | 890 | 711 | +25.2% | 12.2 | 73.0/km^{2} |
| Seton Portage/Shalath | Unincorporated place | Squamish-Lilooet | 30 | 46 | −34.8% | 2.86 | 10.5/km^{2} |
| Seymour Arm | Unincorporated place | Columbia-Shuswap | 162 | 102 | +58.8% | 25.48 | 6.4/km^{2} |
| Shawnigan Lake | Unincorporated place | Cowichan Valley | 3,908 | 3,945 | −0.9% | 7.28 | 536.8/km^{2} |
| Shoreacres | Unincorporated place | Central Kootenay | 317 | 324 | −2.2% | 1.72 | 184.3/km^{2} |
| Shuswap Falls | Unincorporated place | North Okanagan | 124 | 92 | +34.8% | 12.66 | 9.8/km^{2} |
| Silver Creek | Unincorporated place | Columbia-Shuswap | 1,049 | 970 | +8.1% | 37.15 | 28.2/km^{2} |
| Silver Star | Unincorporated place | North Okanagan | 336 | 98 | +242.9% | 0.93 | 361.3/km^{2} |
| Sion | Unincorporated place | Kootenay Boundary | 707 | 658 | +7.4% | 5.4 | 130.9/km^{2} |
| Siska Flat 3 | Indian reserve | Thompson-Nicola | 55 | 52 | +5.8% | 0.38 | 144.7/km^{2} |
| Siska Flat 8 | Indian reserve | Thompson-Nicola | 46 | 38 | +21.1% | 0.24 | 191.7/km^{2} |
| Six Mile | Unincorporated place | Central Kootenay | 1,006 | 1,031 | −2.4% | 3.38 | 297.6/km^{2} |
| Skowkale 10 | Indian reserve | Fraser Valley | 777 | 623 | +24.7% | 0.59 | 1,316.9/km^{2} |
| Skowkale 11 | Indian reserve | Fraser Valley | 206 | 218 | −5.5% | 0.12 | 1,716.7/km^{2} |
| Slesse Park | Unincorporated place | Fraser Valley | 266 | 248 | +7.3% | 4.09 | 65.0/km^{2} |
| Sointula | Unincorporated place | Mount Waddington | 513 | 517 | −0.8% | 5.21 | 98.5/km^{2} |
| Solsqua | Unincorporated place | Columbia-Shuswap | 333 | 241 | +38.2% | 12.33 | 27.0/km^{2} |
| Sorrento | Unincorporated place | Columbia-Shuswap | 1,309 | 1,285 | +1.9% | 11.86 | 110.4/km^{2} |
| South Hazelton | Unincorporated place | Kitimat-Stikine | 193 | 199 | −3.0% | 0.71 | 271.8/km^{2} |
| South Lakeside | Unincorporated place | Cariboo | 393 | 348 | +12.9% | 2.43 | 161.7/km^{2} |
| South Pender Harbour | Unincorporated place | Sunshine Coast | 1,264 | 1,187 | +6.5% | 6.31 | 200.3/km^{2} |
| South Pender Island Trust Area | Island trust | Capital | 306 | 235 | +30.2% | 9.1 | 33.6/km^{2} |
| South Wellington part A | Unincorporated place | Nanaimo | 1,203 | 1,171 | +2.7% | 12.05 | 99.8/km^{2} |
| South Wellington part B | Island trust | Nanaimo | 0 | 0 | NA | 1.19 | 0.0/km^{2} |
| Southbank | Unincorporated place | Bulkley-Nechako | 112 | 110 | +1.8% | 2.83 | 39.6/km^{2} |
| Spences Bridge | Unincorporated place | Thompson-Nicola | 76 | 99 | −23.2% | 0.74 | 102.7/km^{2} |
| Spences Bridge 4 | Indian reserve | Thompson-Nicola | NA | 5 | NA | 0.11 | NA |
| Spences Bridge 4C | Indian reserve | Thompson-Nicola | NA | 0 | NA | 0.11 | NA |
| Sproat Lake | Unincorporated place | Alberni-Clayoquot | 1,697 | 1,492 | +13.7% | 26.67 | 63.6/km^{2} |
| Spuzzum | Unincorporated place | Fraser Valley | 20 | 22 | −9.1% | 1.88 | 10.6/km^{2} |
| Squiaala 7 | Indian reserve | Fraser Valley | 125 | 116 | +7.8% | 0.92 | 135.9/km^{2} |
| Squiaala 8 | Indian reserve | Fraser Valley | 33 | 20 | +65.0% | 0.43 | 76.7/km^{2} |
| St. Mary’s 1 | Indian reserve | East Kootenay | 10 | 0 | NA | 0.1 | 100.0/km^{2} |
| St. Mary's 1A | Indian reserve | East Kootenay | 0 | 15 | −100.0% | 1.25 | 0.0/km^{2} |
| Stillwater | Unincorporated place | qathet | 130 | 116 | +12.1% | 0.52 | 250.0/km^{2} |
| Sunnybrae | Unincorporated place | Columbia-Shuswap | 695 | 610 | +13.9% | 11.39 | 61.0/km^{2} |
| Sunshine Valley | Unincorporated place | Fraser Valley | 208 | 177 | +17.5% | 6.01 | 34.6/km^{2} |
| Swansea Point | Unincorporated place | Columbia-Shuswap | 235 | 161 | +46.0% | 1.52 | 154.6/km^{2} |
| Switsemalph 6 | Indian reserve | Columbia-Shuswap | 161 | 103 | +56.3% | 3.26 | 49.4/km^{2} |
| Switsemalph 7 | Indian reserve | Columbia-Shuswap | 48 | 24 | +100.0% | 1.53 | 31.4/km^{2} |
| Taghum | Unincorporated place | Central Kootenay | 268 | 262 | +2.3% | 1.6 | 167.5/km^{2} |
| Tappen | Unincorporated place | Columbia-Shuswap | 976 | 853 | +14.4% | 26.51 | 36.8/km^{2} |
| Telegraph Creek 6 | Indian reserve | Kitimat-Stikine | 46 | 10 | +360.0% | 0.2 | 230.0/km^{2} |
| Telegraph Creek 6A | Indian reserve | Kitimat-Stikine | 5 | 43 | −88.4% | 0.29 | 17.2/km^{2} |
| Thetis Island Trust Area | Island trust | Cowichan Valley | 476 | 389 | +22.4% | 31.67 | 15.0/km^{2} |
| Tintagle | Unincorporated place | Bulkley-Nechako | 171 | 148 | +15.5% | 3.09 | 55.3/km^{2} |
| Tlell | Unincorporated place | North Coast | 180 | 183 | −1.6% | 100.74 | 1.8/km^{2} |
| Tobiano | Unincorporated place | Thompson-Nicola | 410 | 170 | +141.2% | 3.78 | 108.5/km^{2} |
| Topley | Unincorporated place | Bulkley-Nechako | 80 | 72 | +11.1% | 0.93 | 86.0/km^{2} |
| Trail | Retired population centre | Kootenay Boundary | 9,545 | 9,313 | +2.5% | 20.22 | 472.1/km^{2} |
| T'Sou-ke 1 (Sooke 1) | Indian reserve | Capital | 115 | 90 | +27.8% | 0.25 | 460.0/km^{2} |
| T'Sou-ke 2 (Sooke 2) | Indian reserve | Capital | 115 | 135 | −14.8% | 0.5 | 230.0/km^{2} |
| Two Mile | Unincorporated place | Kitimat-Stikine | 293 | 295 | −0.7% | 3.21 | 91.3/km^{2} |
| UBC Vancouver | Unincorporated place | Metro Vancouver | 15,103 | 12,856 | +17.5% | 4.05 | 3,729.1/km^{2} |
| Union Bay | Unincorporated place | Comox Valley | 1,140 | 1,092 | +4.4% | 13.48 | 84.6/km^{2} |
| University Endowment Lands (UEL) | Unincorporated place | Metro Vancouver | 3,193 | 3,034 | +5.2% | 9.89 | 322.9/km^{2} |
| Van Anda | Unincorporated place | qathet | 362 | 296 | +22.3% | 6.87 | 52.7/km^{2} |
| Vavenby | Unincorporated place | Thompson-Nicola | 237 | 252 | −6.0% | 1.79 | 132.4/km^{2} |
| Wabi Hill | Unincorporated place | Peace River | 288 | 334 | −13.8% | 5.98 | 48.2/km^{2} |
| Walnut Grove | Retired population centre | Metro Vancouver | 28,420 | 28,926 | −1.7% | 17.83 | 1,593.9/km^{2} |
| Wardner | Unincorporated place | East Kootenay | 172 | 117 | +47.0% | 4.54 | 37.9/km^{2} |
| Wasa Lake | Unincorporated place | East Kootenay | 365 | 340 | +7.4% | 5.65 | 64.6/km^{2} |
| West Sahtlam | Unincorporated place | Cowichan Valley | 438 | 411 | +6.6% | 8.64 | 50.7/km^{2} |
| Westbank | Unincorporated place | Central Okanagan | 4,491 | 3,581 | +25.4% | 44.14 | 101.7/km^{2} |
| White Lake | Unincorporated place | Columbia-Shuswap | 731 | 656 | +11.4% | 17.73 | 41.2/km^{2} |
| Wildwood | Unincorporated place | Cariboo | 435 | 537 | −19.0% | 3.02 | 144.0/km^{2} |
| Willow River | Unincorporated place | Fraser-Fort George | 174 | 147 | +18.4% | 1.74 | 100.0/km^{2} |
| Wilmer | Unincorporated place | East Kootenay | 242 | 242 | 0.0% | 1.02 | 237.3/km^{2} |
| Windermere | Unincorporated place | East Kootenay | 1,511 | 1,092 | +38.4% | 10.45 | 144.6/km^{2} |
| Winlaw | Unincorporated place | Central Kootenay | 310 | 297 | +4.4% | 3.48 | 89.1/km^{2} |
| Winter Harbour | Unincorporated place | Mount Waddington | 15 | 5 | +200.0% | 1.1 | 13.6/km^{2} |
| Woss | Unincorporated place | Mount Waddington | 206 | 189 | +9.0% | 1.47 | 140.1/km^{2} |
| Wynndel part A | Unincorporated place | Central Kootenay | 650 | 555 | +17.1% | 5.23 | 124.3/km^{2} |
| Wynndel part B | Unincorporated place | Central Kootenay | 42 | 42 | 0.0% | 0.62 | 67.7/km^{2} |
| Yahk | Unincorporated place | Central Kootenay | 179 | 162 | +10.5% | 4.32 | 41.4/km^{2} |
| Yale | Unincorporated place | Fraser Valley | 162 | 143 | +13.3% | 3.38 | 47.9/km^{2} |
| Ymir | Unincorporated place | Central Kootenay | 214 | 245 | −12.7% | 1.09 | 196.3/km^{2} |
| Youbou | Unincorporated place | Cowichan Valley | 1,302 | 1,086 | +19.9% | 8.89 | 146.5/km^{2} |
| Total designated places | — | — | 258,060 | 3,519.43 | +7,232.4% | 3,401.28 | 73.3/km^{2} |
| Province of British Columbia | — | — | 5,000,879 | 4,648,055 | +7.6% | 920,686.55 | 5.4/km^{2} |

== See also ==
- List of census agglomerations in British Columbia
- List of population centres in British Columbia
