= Balmoral, British Columbia =

Balmoral
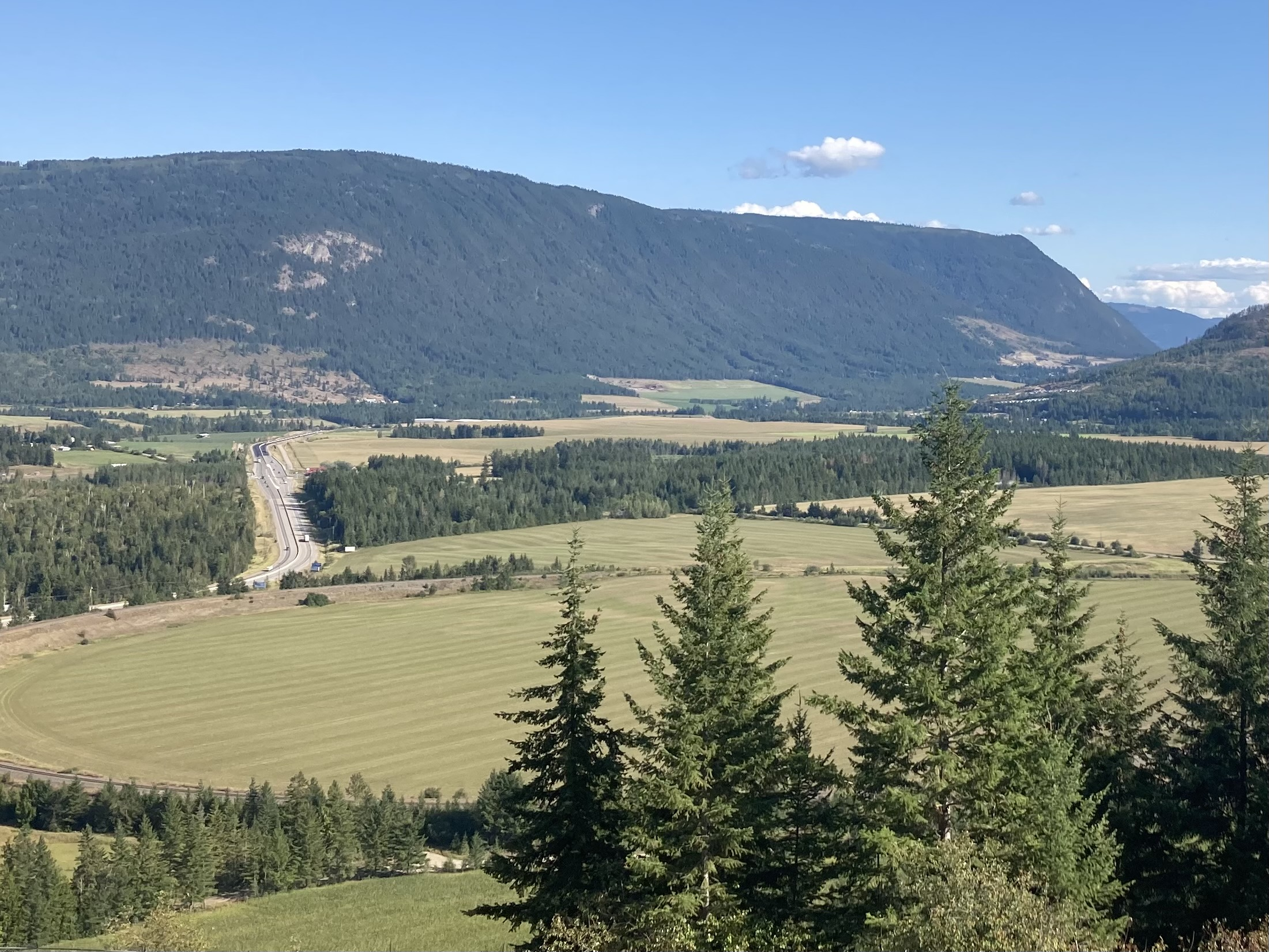

- Location of Balmoral in British Columbia
- Coordinates: 50°51′00″N 119°21′00″W
- Country: Canada
- Province: British Columbia
- Time zone: UTC−07:00 (PT)
- Area codes: 250, 778

Balmoral is an unincorporated settlement in the Shuswap Country region of the Southern Interior of British Columbia, Canada. It is located to the south of Blind Bay on Shuswap Lake and is administered by the Columbia-Shuswap Regional District.
