= Bush Creek East fire =

2023 wildfire in British Columbia, Canada

Bush Creek East
- Part of the 2023 Canada wildfires
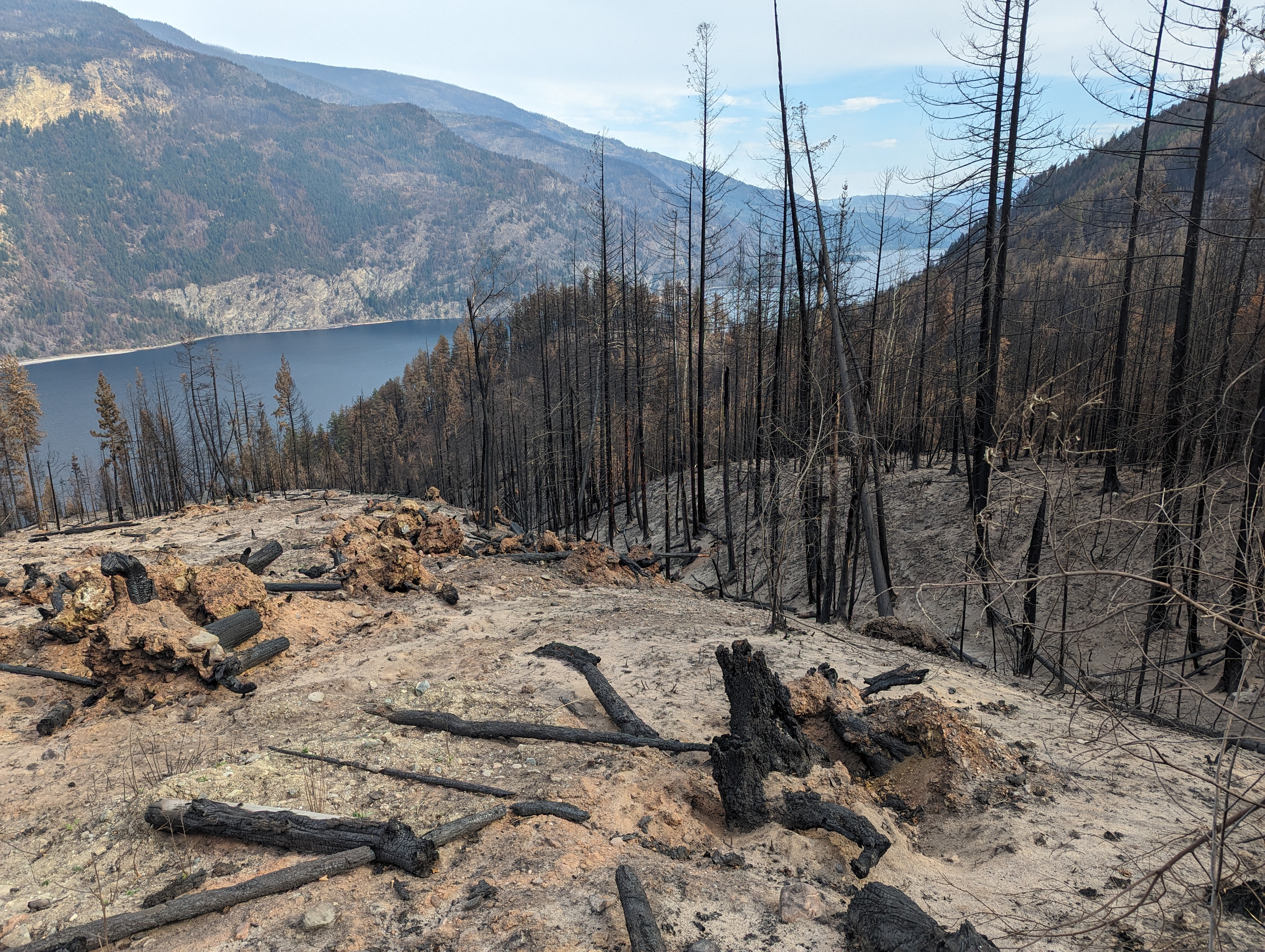
- Date: July 12, 2023 – December 13, 2023
- Location: Adams Lake and Shuswap Lake

Statistics
- Total area: 45,613 hectares (112,710 acres)

Impacts
- Evacuated: 3500 properties
- Structures destroyed: 270
- Cost: 240,000,000 CAD

Ignition
- Cause: Lightning

Map
- Perimeter of the Bush Creek East fire (map data)

The Bush Creek East fire was a wildfire in the Canadian province of British Columbia. The fire caused a major loss of structures and forced the evacuation of thousands of residents. The communities of Squilax, Lee Creek, Adams Lake, Scotch Creek, and Celista were heavily impacted by the fire. The fire was listed as "being held" in September 2023 at a size of 45,613 hectares (112,710 acres), and was declared out in December of 2023.

== Background ==
Western Canada has seen a climate change-induced warming and drying trend since the mid-2000s. The province of B.C. experienced major fire seasons in 2017, 2018, and 2021, with burned areas far exceeding yearly averages. Much of the province went into 2023 in drought conditions made worse by a hot, dry fall season in 2022 and lower than average snowfall over the winter. The Shuswap and Okanagan regions saw average temperatures of 2 degrees Celsius above normal during the summer, with extremely low amounts of precipitation.

== Ignition ==
The conflagration started as two separate fires, first detected on July 12, 2023. The first, Bush Creek East, started on a ridge near Bush Creek between Adams Lake and Sun Peaks to the west. The second, called Lower Adams Lake East, started on the steep eastern shores of Adams Lake. Both were assessed to be caused by lightning, the result of a series of thunderstorms that passed over the area on July 11 and 12.

=== Spread and structure loss ===
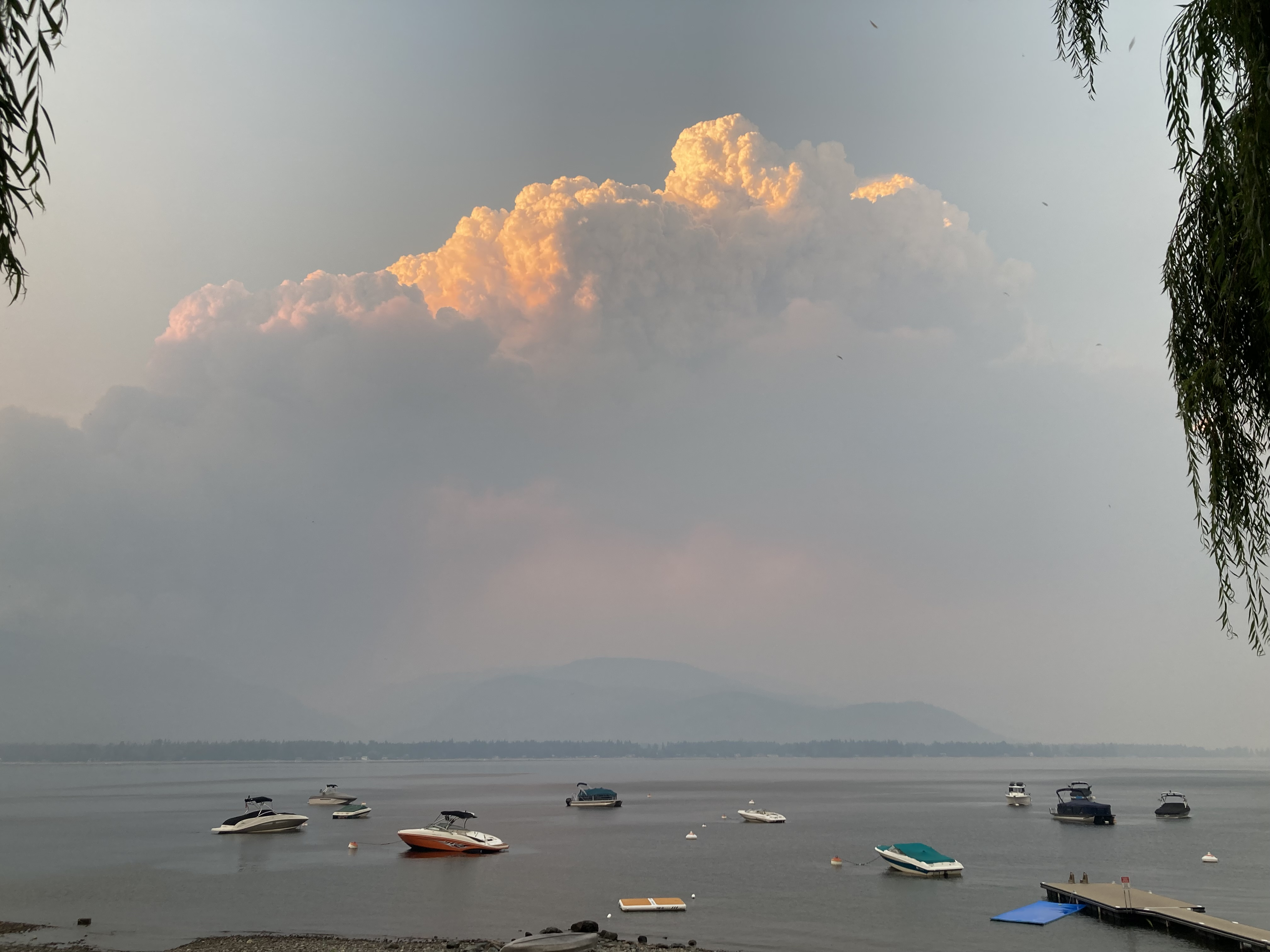
A pyrocumulus cloud forms over the North Shuswap area during the August expansion of the fire.

The two fires experienced moderate spread in mid-to-late July. They were placed under an Incident Management Team along with the Rossmoore Lake fire, which was threatening the city of Kamloops to the west. Properties on the southeastern end of Adams Lake were placed on evacuation alert on July 20.

The fire began spreading rapidly on August 19 and 20. A cold front caused strong 40 km/h winds from the north, causing a massive fire expansion. The two fires joined with each other during the expansion. BC Wildfire officers reported a 20 km growth of the perimeter in 12 hours, a rate of growth "unheard of in B.C. wildfire activity".

The North Shuswap area was placed under an evacuation order, but many residents ignored it. RCMP blockades were circumvented by residents through back roads and by watercraft on Shuswap Lake. Some residents fought the fires on their own.

There were no fatalities from the fire, although several crews narrowly avoided injuries during a 'backburn', or planned ignition operation, on the fire on August 17 and 18.

The expanded fire destroyed 270 structures in the North Shuswap area, with severe damages to the Little Shuswap Band, Scotch Creek, and Celista communities. 3500 properties were placed under evacuation orders. 174 buildings were lost in the Columbia-Shuswap Regional District, 9 in the Thompson-Nicola Regional District, and 85 in the Skwlax First Nation. The fire caused over 240 million Canadian dollars in insured damage.
