= Anstey-Hunakwa Provincial Park =

Provincial park in British Columbia, Canada

- IUCN category II (national park)
- Location within British Columbia
- Interactive map of Anstey-Hunakwa Provincial Park
- Location: Salmon Arm, British Columbia, Canada
- Nearest city: Salmon Arm, BC
- Coordinates: 51°08′29″N 118°54′54″W
- Area: 6,852 ha (16,930 acres)
- Established: 18 April 2001
- Governing body: BC Parks

Anstey-Hunakwa Provincial Park is a provincial park in the Shuswap Country of the Southern Interior of British Columbia, Canada. 6,852 hectares in size, the park was established 18 April 2001.

The park aims to protect grizzly, black bear, moose, mule deer, pine marten, and Townsend's big-eared bat. Includes the most extensive undisturbed Interior Cedar Hemlock moist-warm Variant 3.

== Access ==
Access to the park is by boat at the north end of Anstey Arm on Shuswap Lake. The closest communities are Sicamous, Sorrento and Salmon Arm.
