= Eagle Bay =

Eagle Bay may refer to:

- Eagle Bay, British Columbia, Canada
- Eagle Bay, New York, United States
- Eagle Bay, Western Australia, Australia
