= Wee Tan Louie =

Canadian First World War soldier

Wee Tan Louie (1889–1970) was one of 300 Chinese Canadians to serve in the First World War.

Born in Shuswap Country, Louie was denied permission to enlist in Kamloops due to his race: officials felt that if Chinese Canadians were allowed to enlist, "their demands to be treated fairly could not be ignored as easily". He took a three-month journey by horse over the Rocky Mountains to Calgary, where he successfully enlisted and shipped out to England. He was wounded in action as a runner and received the Victory Medal and British War Medal for his service. After the war he worked as a taxi driver. He and his wife Lillian, whom he married in 1931, had four children.

His brother Wee Hong Louie also served in the First World War.
