= Eagle Bay, British Columbia =

Eagle Bay
- Designated place
- Location of Eagle Bay in British Columbia
- Coordinates: 50°55′58″N 119°12′49″W
- Country: Canada
- Province: British Columbia

Population (2021)
  - Total: 557
- Time zone: UTC−07:00 (PT)
- Area codes: 250, 778

Historical population
Year	Pop.	±%
1996	432	—
2001	423	−2.1%
2006	528	+24.8%
2011	400	−24.2%
2016	428	+7.0%
2021	557	+30.1%
Sources: Statistics Canada

Eagle Bay is a designated place located on the Shuswap Highland Peninsula on the southern shore of Shuswap Lake in British Columbia, Canada.

== Location and Nearby Settlements ==
The community is situated across the lake from Crowfoot Mountain on the southern shore of Shuswap Lake. It is 24 kilometres east of Sorrento, British Columbia, which is about 20 minutes by automobile. Access to Eagle Bay from Sorrento is via Blind Bay Road and Eagle Bay Road or via the Trans-Canada Highway, Balmoral Road and Eagle Bay Rd.

The South Shuswap region, where Eagle Bay is found, includes the communities of Balmoral, Blind Bay, Carlin, Notch Hill, Skimikin, Sorrento, Sunnybrae, Tappen, White Lake, and Wild Rose Bay.
