= Sunnybrae Provincial Park =

Provisional park in British Columbia, Canada

Coordinates: 50°46′00″N 119°18′00″W

Sunnybrae Park
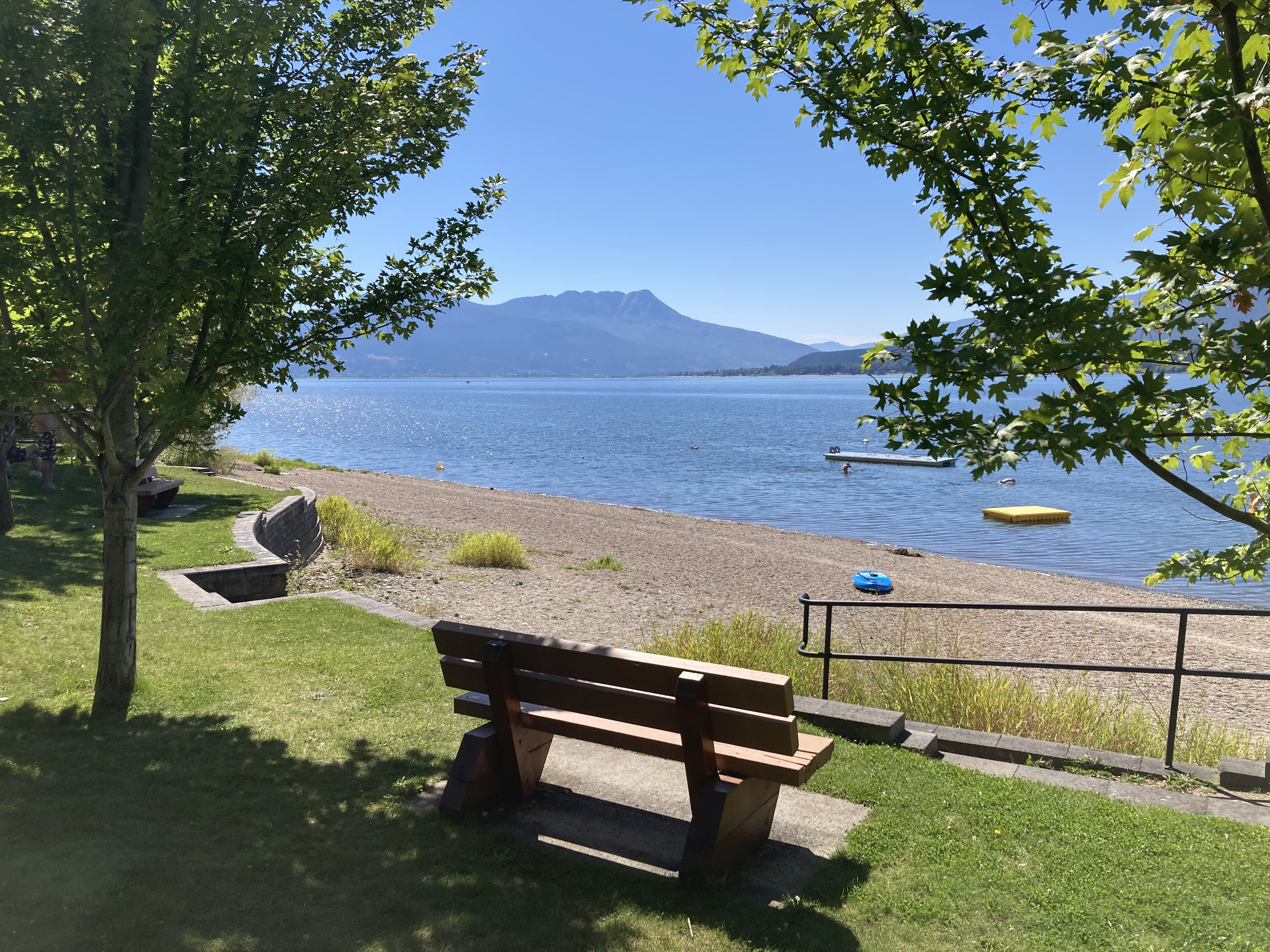
- Beach area with Mount Ida
- Interactive map of Sunnybrae Park
- Type: Provincial park
- Location: British Columbia, Canada
- Nearest city: Salmon Arm, British Columbia
- Area: 61.3 acres (24.8 ha)
- Established: July 31, 1975

Sunnybrae Provincial Park is a provincial park in British Columbia, Canada, located on the northern side of the Salmon Arm of Shuswap Lake, near the city of Salmon Arm. Sunnybrae is a day-use park with washrooms, picnic tables, playground and swimming area. It was established as a Recreation Area in 1975, and upgraded to a Provincial Park in 1989.
