= Salmon River (Shuswap Lake) =

River in the Shuswap region of British Columbia, Canada

Coordinates: 50.684888°N 119.334907°W

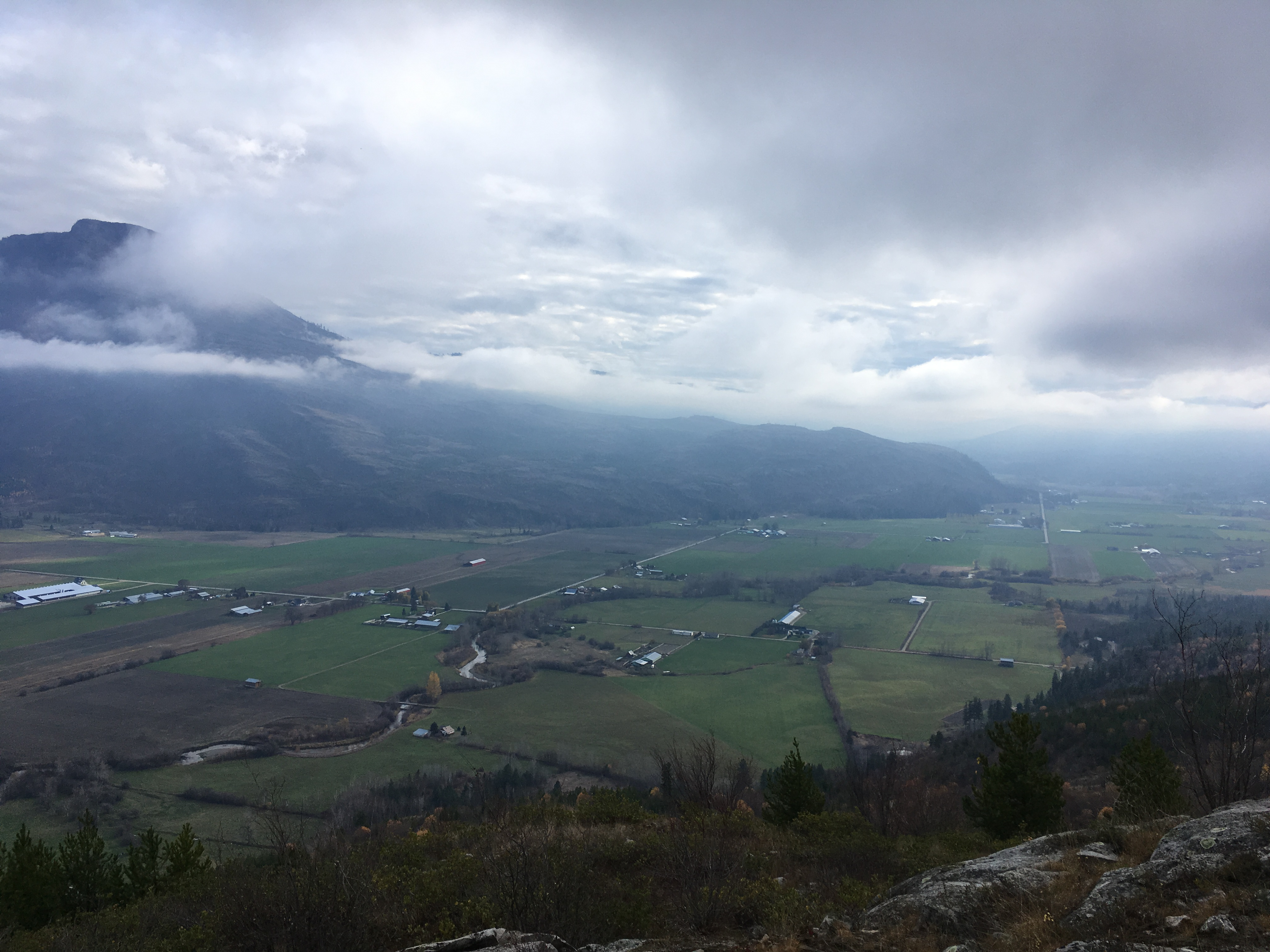
- Salmon River Valley near the river's mouth at Shuswap Lake

Physical characteristics
- Mouth: Shuswap Lake
- Length: 120 kilometres (75 mi)
- Basin size: 1,510 square kilometres (580 sq mi)
- Discharge
  - average: 2 m^{3}/s (71 cu ft/s)
  - minimum: 0.344 m^{3}/s (12.1 cu ft/s) (August 2009))
  - maximum: 12 m^{3}/s (420 cu ft/s) (May 2018)

The Salmon River is a river in the Shuswap region of British Columbia, Canada. The river is one of the main tributaries for Shuswap Lake, and provides for agriculture in its lower valley. The river was historically the location of a large sockeye salmon run, but no longer supports significant salmon populations.

== Course ==
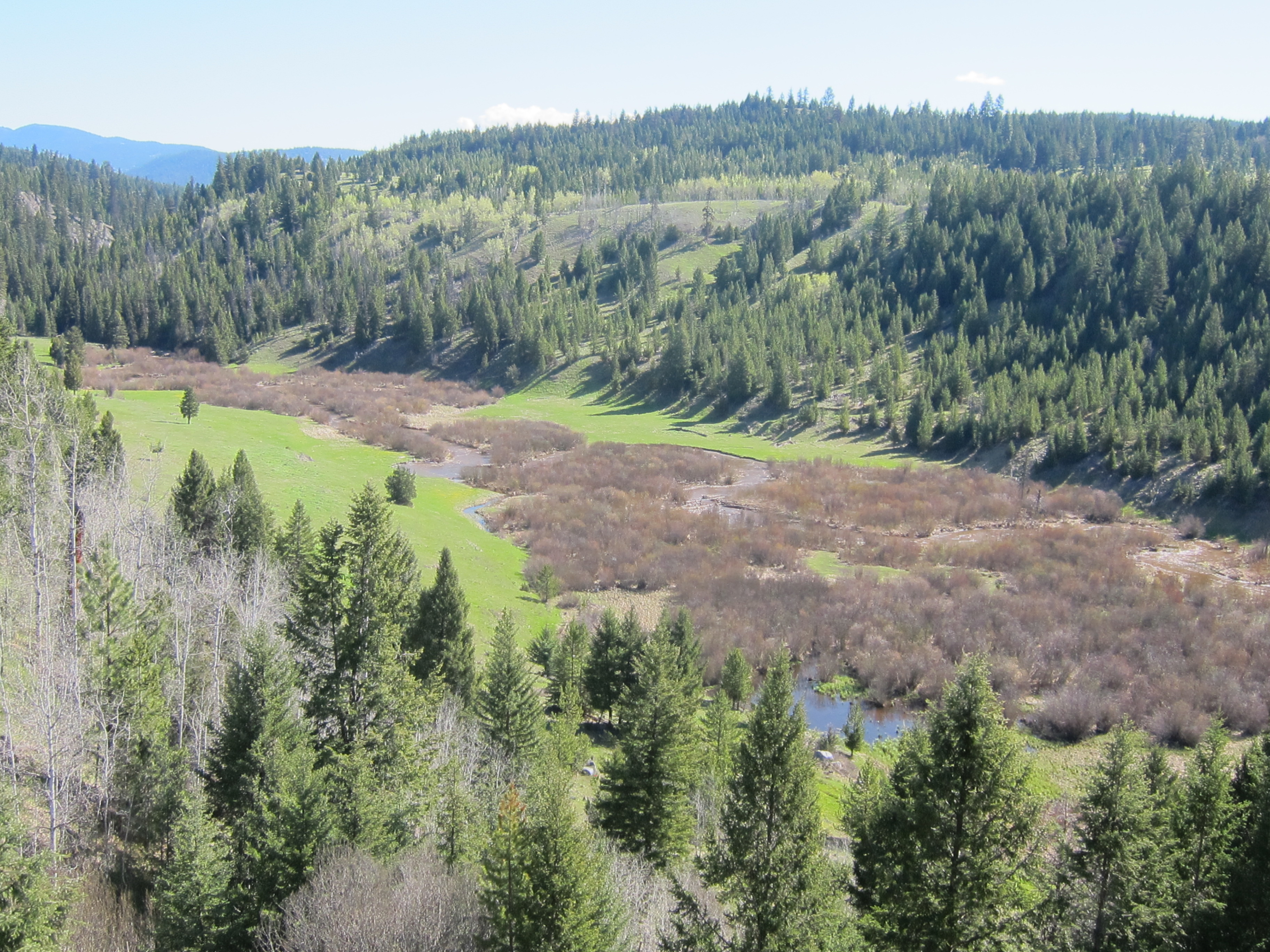
Upper reaches of the river near Salmon Lake

The river arises in the Monte Hills on the Thompson Plateau, between Kamloops and Kelowna. It flows west to Salmon Lake, then issues northeastward and descends into a broad valley near Westwold. It then runs east along the route of Highway 97 past the town of Falkland before turning north again through the Silver Creek area to flow into the Salmon Arm of Shuswap Lake at Salmon Arm. The total length of the river is 120 kilometres (75 mi). The drainage basin for the Salmon River is 1,510 square kilometres (580 sq mi).

For several kilometres upstream and downstream of Westwold the river runs through a deep gravel bed; in this section it has no surface flow except during freshet in any year that is not exceptionally wet. This presents a barrier to migratory fish. Tributary creeks of the Salmon River include Twig, Pringle, Bolean, and Spa.

=== Water quality ===
The Salmon River, especially in its middle and lower reaches, is heavily impacted by agricultural activities. The phosphorus levels in the river can be high and contribute to algae blooms in Shuswap Lake's Tappen Bay.

The river takes its name from the numerous salmon that spawned in the river prior to 1914, the year of the Hell's Gate Slide. Since then the salmon run has been very small, and salmon fishing is prohibited. Local groups and government agencies have identified several factors that limit the recovery of the run, including erosion from livestock grazing and watering on sensitive riverbanks, low water levels from water diverted for irrigation, and water quality problems from logging and agricultural fertilizers.
