= Anstey River =

Location
- Country: Canada
- Province: British Columbia
- Land District: Kamloops Division Yale

Physical characteristics
- Source
  - location: Columbia Mountains
- Mouth
  - location: Shuswap Lake
  - coordinates: 51°07′51″N 118°53′58″W
- Length: 30 km (19 mi)
- Basin size: 24,000 ha (59,000 acres)

The Anstey River is a 30-kilometre-long (19 mi) river in the Interior region of British Columbia, Canada. It flows roughly north to south from the Monashee range of the Columbia Mountains, and drains into Anstey Arm on Shuswap Lake. The Anstey River drainage covers 24,000 hectares (59,000 acres) and is uninhabited. The river was named for Francis Senior Anstey, who operated one of the first major logging operations in the area. The lower river and its delta are protected within Anstey Hunakwa Provincial Park.

== See also ==
- List of rivers of British Columbia
