= Eagle Bay Provincial Park =

Provincial park in British Columbia, Canada

- IUCN category II (national park)
- Location within British Columbia
- Interactive map of Eagle Bay Provincial Park
- Location: Range 4 Coast Land District, British Columbia, Canada
- Nearest city: Kitimat, British Columbia
- Coordinates: 53°48′11″N 128°42′40″W
- Area: 262 ha (650 acres)
- Established: May 17, 2004
- Governing body: BC Parks

Eagle Bay Provincial Park is a provincial park in British Columbia, Canada which covers 262 hectares of land.

== See also ==
- Eagle Bay, British Columbia (Shuswap Country)
