= Shuswap Country =

Coordinates: 50.93°N 119.12°W

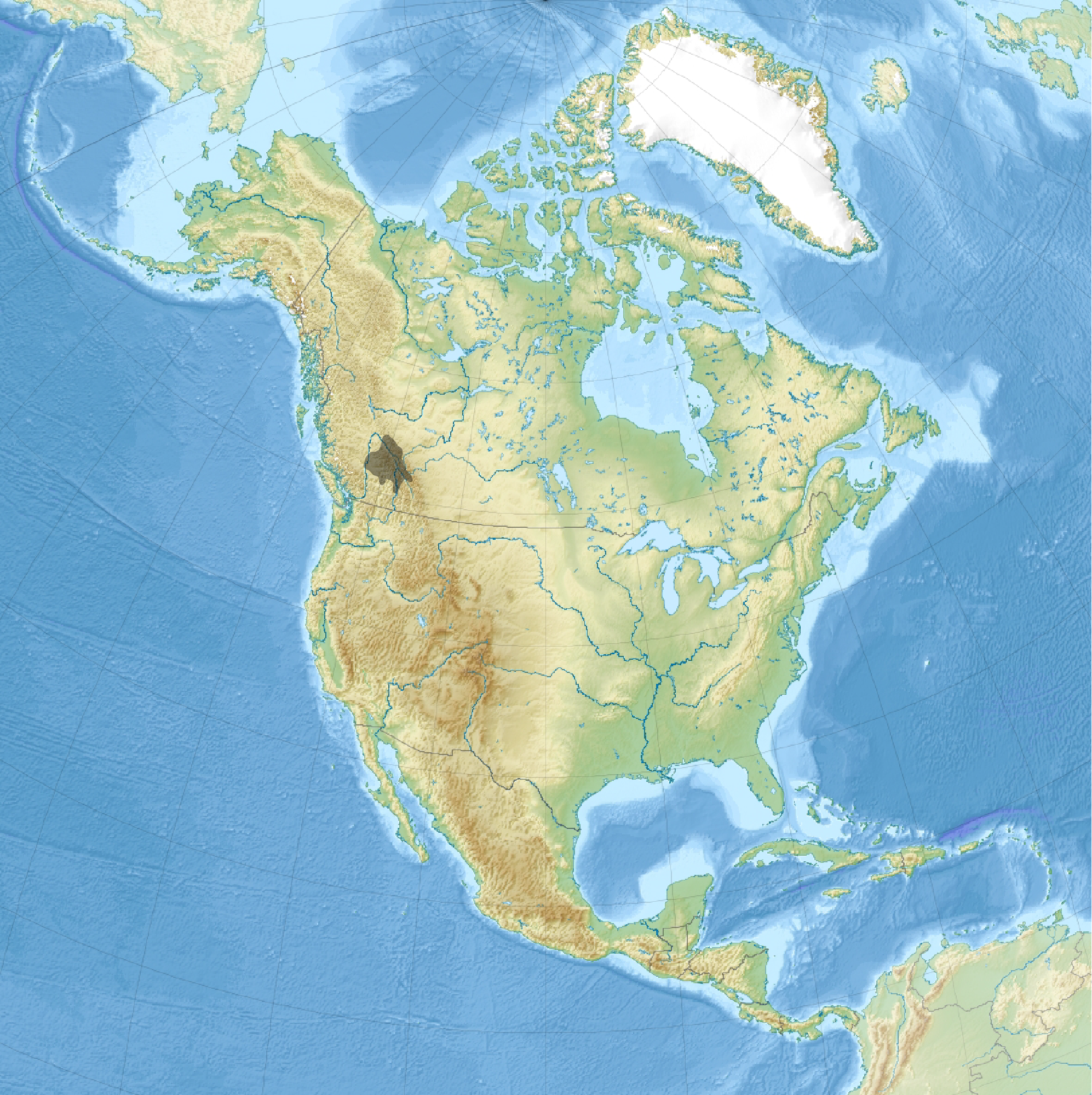
- Location and extent of Secwepemcúĺecw on Turtle Island (North America)

Secwépemc (Shuswap)
- People: Secwépemc
- Language: Secwepemctsín; Secwepemcékst
- Country: Secwepemcúl̓ecw

The Shuswap Country, or simply the Shuswap, (Note: Shuswap is pronounced /ˈʃuːʃwɑːp/ SHOOSH-wahp and called Secwepemcúl̓ecw in the indigenous Shuswap language.) is a term used in the Canadian province of British Columbia to refer to the environs of Shuswap Lake. The upper reaches of the Shuswap basin, southeast of Shuswap Lake and northeast of the Okanagan, are generally considered to be part of Okanagan or of the Monashee Country rather than "the Shuswap".

Roughly defined, the Shuswap Country begins on its west at the town of Chase, located on Little Shuswap Lake, west of which is the South Thompson area of the Thompson Country, and includes Adams Lake to the northwest of Shuswap Lake as well as communities in the Eagle River area as far as Craigellachie and Three Valley Gap, which is at the summit of Eagle Pass, beyond which eastwards is the Columbia Country.

The Shuswap name was first applied to the Secwépemc first nation and the country on which they lived. It thus roughly defined the country between the Kootenays and the Lower Fraser Valley.

== Settlements and towns ==
- Chase
- Enderby (also considered part of the Okanagan)
- Falkland
- Grindrod (also considered part of the Okanagan)
- Salmon Arm
  - Canoe
- Sicamous
- Malakwa
- Celista
- Scotch Creek
- Sorrento
- Seymour Arm

== Usages ==
The Shuswap is often referred to in tandem form: Kamloops-Shuswap, Columbia-Shuswap, Okanagan-Shuswap/Shuswap-Okanagan.

== See also ==
- Kamloops-Shuswap, former federal electoral district
- Okanagan-Shuswap, current federal electoral district
