= Mount Ida (Shuswap Highland) =

Mountain of Shuswap Highland in Canada

Coordinates: 50.6381°N 119.3078°W

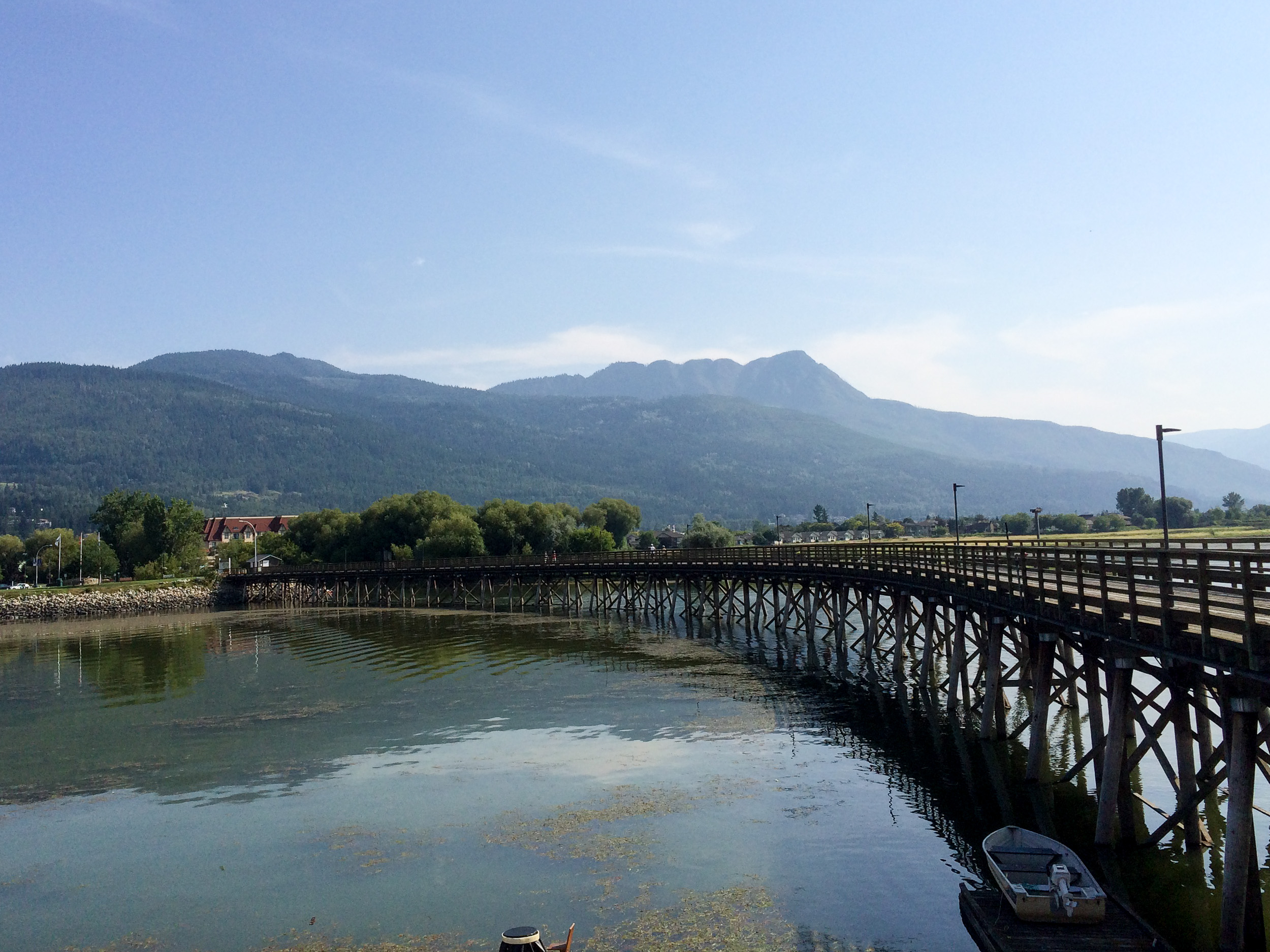
Mount Ida of the Shuswap Highland, north aspect

Mount Ida, also known as Kela7scen, is a 1,574 m (5,164 ft) high mountain of Shuswap Highland located in the southern portion of Columbia-Shuswap Regional District. The mountain resembles a defensive palisade and overlooks the city of Salmon Arm from the south.

The mountain has held special importance for inhabitants of the area since time immemorial. “Known to the Secwépemc people as Kela7scen for its funny coloured rocks, the mountain is considered by Secwepemc people to be sacred ground.”
