= Herald Provincial Park =

Canadian provincial park

- IUCN category II (national park)
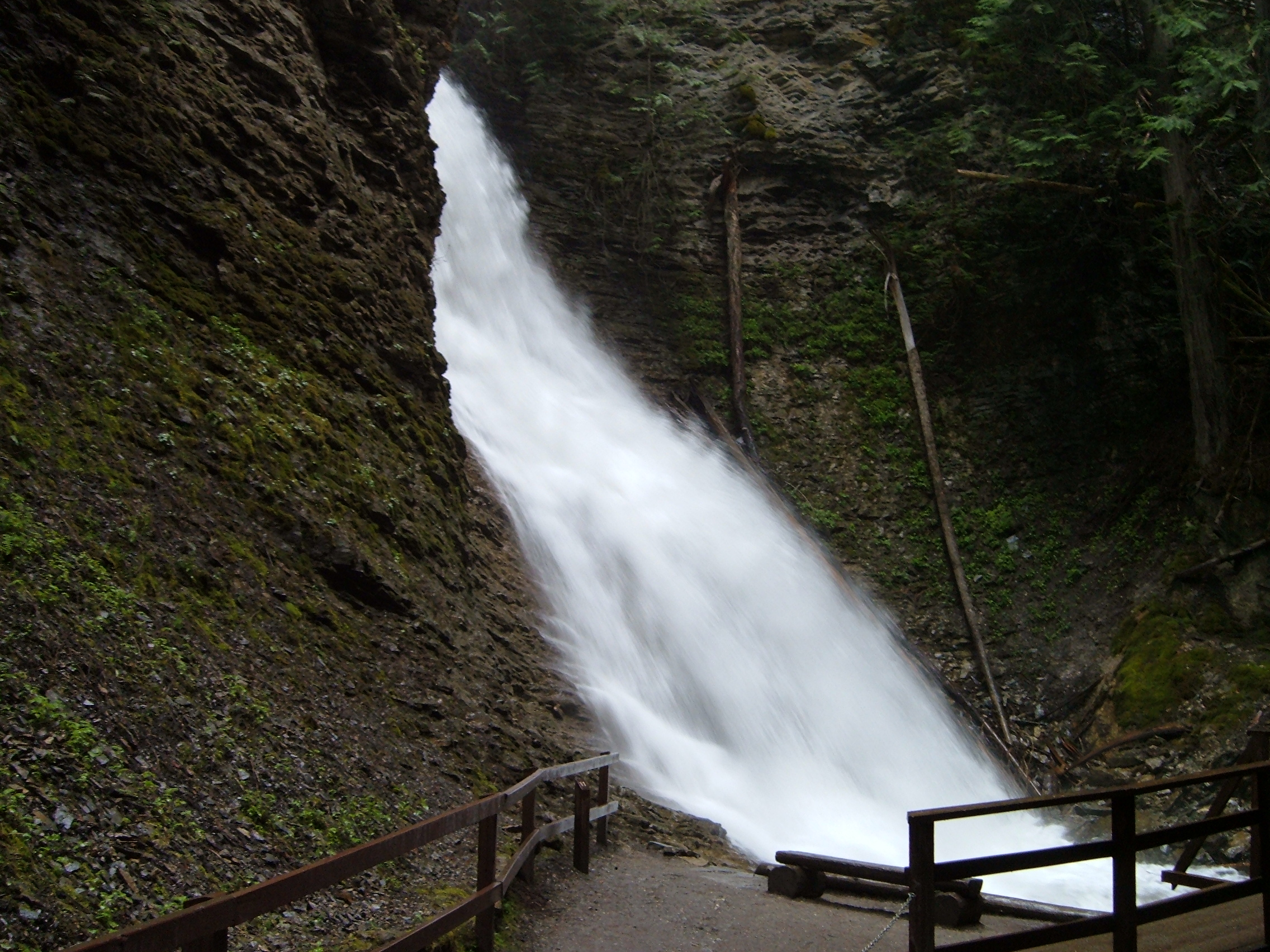
- Margaret Falls

- Location within British Columbia
- Interactive map of Herald Provincial Park
- Location: Kamloops Division Yale Land District, British Columbia, Canada
- Nearest city: Salmon Arm, BC
- Coordinates: 50°47′26″N 119°12′11″W
- Area: 79 ha (200 acres)
- Established: September 11, 1975
- Governing body: BC Parks

Herald Provincial Park is a provincial park in British Columbia, Canada. It is on the north shore of the Salmon Arm of Shuswap Lake, in the Southern Interior of British Columbia, Canada. The park is some 30 minutes northeast of the city of Salmon Arm (by road). Herald Park contains a popular camping area, as well as a day use/picnic area. Large pebble beaches stretch along the southern boundary of the park. Walking and hiking trails exist throughout the park, including an easy 10-minute hike to the spectacular Margaret Falls.

The site of Herald Park was originally settled by the Herald family at the turn of the century and remained a family farm until the 1970s. The land was then turned over to the Provincial Government with the exception of the "homesite", where Ms. Jesse Herald continued to reside until her death.
