= Wee Hong Louie =

Chinese Canadian World War I soldier

Wee Hong Louie (later Walter Louie; 1894–unknown) was one of 300 Chinese Canadians to serve in the First World War.

He enlisted in 1917 as a gunner, later becoming a driver and wireless operator. He was awarded the Victory Medal and British War Medal for his service. After being discharged, he studied electrical engineering at the University of Chicago. However, he was refused a business license for a radio repair business in Ontario due to his race. He mailed his medals and uniform to Prime Minister Mackenzie King, who apologized and overruled the decision.

His brother Wee Tan Louie also served in the First World War.
