= Tappen, British Columbia =

Tappen
- Local urban district
- Location of Tappen in British Columbia
- Coordinates: 50°47′01″N 119°20′08″W
- Country: Canada
- Province: British Columbia
- Region: Shuswap Country
- Regional District: Columbia-Shuswap

Government
  - MP (North Okanagan—Shuswap): Mel Arnold (CPC)
  - MLA (Shuswap): Greg Kyllo (Lib)

Area
  - Total: 26.51 km^{2} (10.24 sq mi)
- Elevation: 365 m (1,198 ft)

Population (2021)
  - Total: 976
  - Density: 36.8/km^{2} (95/sq mi)
- Time zone: UTC-8 (CST)
  - Summer (DST): UTC-7 (CDT)
- Postal code span: V0E 2X0

Tappen is an unincorporated community in British Columbia. The settlement is located on the shores of Shuswap Lake. It is colloquially known as "Rust Valley", and is the location of the TV show Rust Valley Restorers. The area of the community was originally named Tappen Siding, according to the Vernon & District Family History Society and was named after Canadian Pacific Railway construction contractor Herbert Tappen. A sawmill was built in 1883 and Tappen first appeared on BC Land maps in 1891. A year later the Tappen Siding post office opened in 1892, though it was closed a few years later in 1897.
