= Shuswap terrane =

The Shuswap terrane (sometimes spelled as Shuswap terrain) is a geological terrane in western North America. It straddles the United States and Canadian borders in British Columbia and Washington State. It originated in the Mesozoic era. The terrane consists of three sections: the Monashee Complex, the Monashee decollement, and the Selkirk allochthon. The terrane contains foliated metamorphic rocks. It extends from the southern Robson Valley to the Okanagan region. Its western boundary is near Quesnel Lake, and it extends eastward into the Selkirk Range of southeastern British Columbia.
