= Malakwa =

- Nickname: The Kwa
- Location of Malakwa in British Columbia
- Coordinates: 50°55′59″N 118°48′04″W
- Country: Canada
- Province: British Columbia
- Region: Shuswap Country
- Regional district: Columbia-Shuswap

Area
  - Total: 27.68 km^{2} (10.69 sq mi)

Population (2021)
  - Total: 559
  - Density: 20.2/km^{2} (52.3/sq mi)
- Time zone: UTC−07:00 (PT)
- Area codes: 250, 778, 236, & 672
- Highways: Highway 1

Malakwa is a settlement in Shuswap Country in the Southern Interior of British Columbia, Canada, in the Eagle River valley, along the Trans-Canada Highway between Sicamous and Revelstoke.

The name comes from the Chinook Jargon word for mosquito, adapted from the French le maringouin

It is in the interior wetbelt region and is home to an inland rainforest with towering old-growth forests and lots of biodiversity, Places include Eagle River Provincial Park and North Fork Wild Park. .
