= Columbia-Shuswap Regional District =

Regional district in British Columbia, Canada

Columbia–Shuswap
- Regional district
- Columbia–Shuswap Regional District
- Logo

- Location in British Columbia
- Country: Canada
- Province: British Columbia
- Named for: Columbia River, Shuswap Lake
- Administrative office location: Salmon Arm

Government
  - Type: Regional district
  - Body: Board of directors
  - Chair: Kevin Flynn (City of Salmon Arm)
  - Vice chair: Rhona Martin (E)
  - Electoral areas: A – Rural Golden; B – Rural Revelstoke–Columbia/Trout Lake; C – South Shuswap; D – Falkland/Salmon Valley/Deep Creek/Ranchero; E – Rural Sicamous–Malakwa; F – North Shuswap–Seymour Arm; G – Blind Bay/Sorrento/Notch Hill

Area
  - Land: 28,929.19 km^{2} (11,169.62 sq mi)

Population (2021)
  - Total: 57,021
  - Density: 1.9711/km^{2} (5.1050/sq mi)

Time zones
- Electoral areas B–F / Glacier National Park: UTC−7 (PCT)
- Electoral area A (excluding Glacier): UTC−6 (CST)
- Website: www.csrd.bc.ca

The Columbia–Shuswap Regional District is a regional district in the Canadian province of British Columbia, located in the Southern Interior region on the Trans-Canada Highway between Vancouver and Calgary, Alberta. The regional district borders the Province of Alberta across the Rocky Mountains.

Columbia–Shuswap regional district comprises the regions known as the Shuswap Country, which focuses around Shuswap Lake and lies to the north of the Okanagan region, and the northern part of the Columbia Country, namely the "Big Bend" of the valley of the Columbia River from the Town of Golden to the historic City of Revelstoke, British Columbia. (Revelstoke is sometimes referred to as being in the North Kootenay, Golden is usually thought of as being part of the East Kootenay sub-region, the Columbia Valley). The Canada 2021 Census population was 57,021, spread over a land area of 28,929 square km and a water area of over 2,000 square km. The regional district's offices are in Salmon Arm, near the southwest corner of the regional district.

== Demographics ==
As a census division in the 2021 Census of Population conducted by Statistics Canada, the Columbia-Shuswap Regional District had a population of 57,021 living in 24,595 of its 31,161 total private dwellings, an increase of 11% from its 2016 population of 51,366. With a land area of 28,885.82 km^{2} (11,152.88 sq mi), it had a population density of 2.0/km^{2} (5.1/sq mi) in 2021.

Panethnic groups in the Columbia–Shuswap Regional District (2001–2021)
Panethnic group	2021		2016		2011		2006		2001	
Panethnic group	Pop.	%	Pop.	%	Pop.	%	Pop.	%	Pop.	%
European (Note: Statistic includes all persons that did not make up part of a visible minority or an indigenous identity.)	48,805	87.51%	44,930	89.51%	44,980	90.74%	45,815	92.55%	44,580	93.21%
Indigenous	4,405	7.9%	3,645	7.26%	3,280	6.62%	2,760	5.58%	2,155	4.51%
East Asian (Note: Statistic includes total responses of "Chinese", "Korean", and "Japanese" under visible minority section on census.)	705	1.26%	640	1.28%	580	1.17%	315	0.64%	400	0.84%
Southeast Asian (Note: Statistic includes total responses of "Filipino" and "Southeast Asian" under visible minority section on census.)	605	1.08%	315	0.63%	155	0.31%	100	0.2%	85	0.18%
South Asian	585	1.05%	355	0.71%	400	0.81%	345	0.7%	330	0.69%
African	245	0.44%	175	0.35%	95	0.19%	75	0.15%	100	0.21%
Latin American	200	0.36%	65	0.13%	50	0.1%	55	0.11%	105	0.22%
Middle Eastern (Note: Statistic includes total responses of "West Asian" and "Arab" under visible minority section on census.)	160	0.29%	35	0.07%	0	0%	20	0.04%	30	0.06%
Other (Note: Statistic includes total responses of "Visible minority, n.i.e." and "Multiple visible minorities" under visible minority section on census.)	65	0.12%	45	0.09%	20	0.04%	15	0.03%	35	0.07%
Total responses	55,770	97.81%	50,195	97.72%	49,570	98.14%	49,505	98.73%	47,825	99.18%
Total population	57,021	100%	51,366	100%	50,512	100%	50,141	100%	48,219	100%

- Note: Totals greater than 100% due to multiple origin responses.

== Communities ==
=== Incorporated communities ===
- City of Salmon Arm – 19,705
- City of Revelstoke – 8,275
- Town of Golden – 3,986
- District Municipality of Sicamous – 2,613

=== Regional district electoral areas ===
- Columbia–Shuswap Electoral Area "A" – 3,097
- Columbia–Shuswap Electoral Area "B" – 706
- Columbia–Shuswap Electoral Area "C" – 7,695
- Columbia–Shuswap Electoral Area "D" – 3,899
- Columbia–Shuswap Electoral Area "E" – 1,528
- Columbia–Shuswap Electoral Area "F" – 2,731
- Columbia–Shuswap Electoral Area "G" – Census data not available

=== Unincorporated communities ===
- Anglemont – 454
- Blind Bay – 1,149
- Celista – 408
- Craigellachie
- Eagle Bay – 528
- Falkland – 805
- Malakwa – 619
- Notch Hill – 515
- Ranchero – 971
- Scotch Creek – 762
- Silver Creek – 1,038
- Solsqua — 333
- Sorrento – 1,360
- Sunnybrae – 699
- Swansea Point – 243
- Tappen – 773
- White Lake – 623
