= Canoe, British Columbia =

Canoe
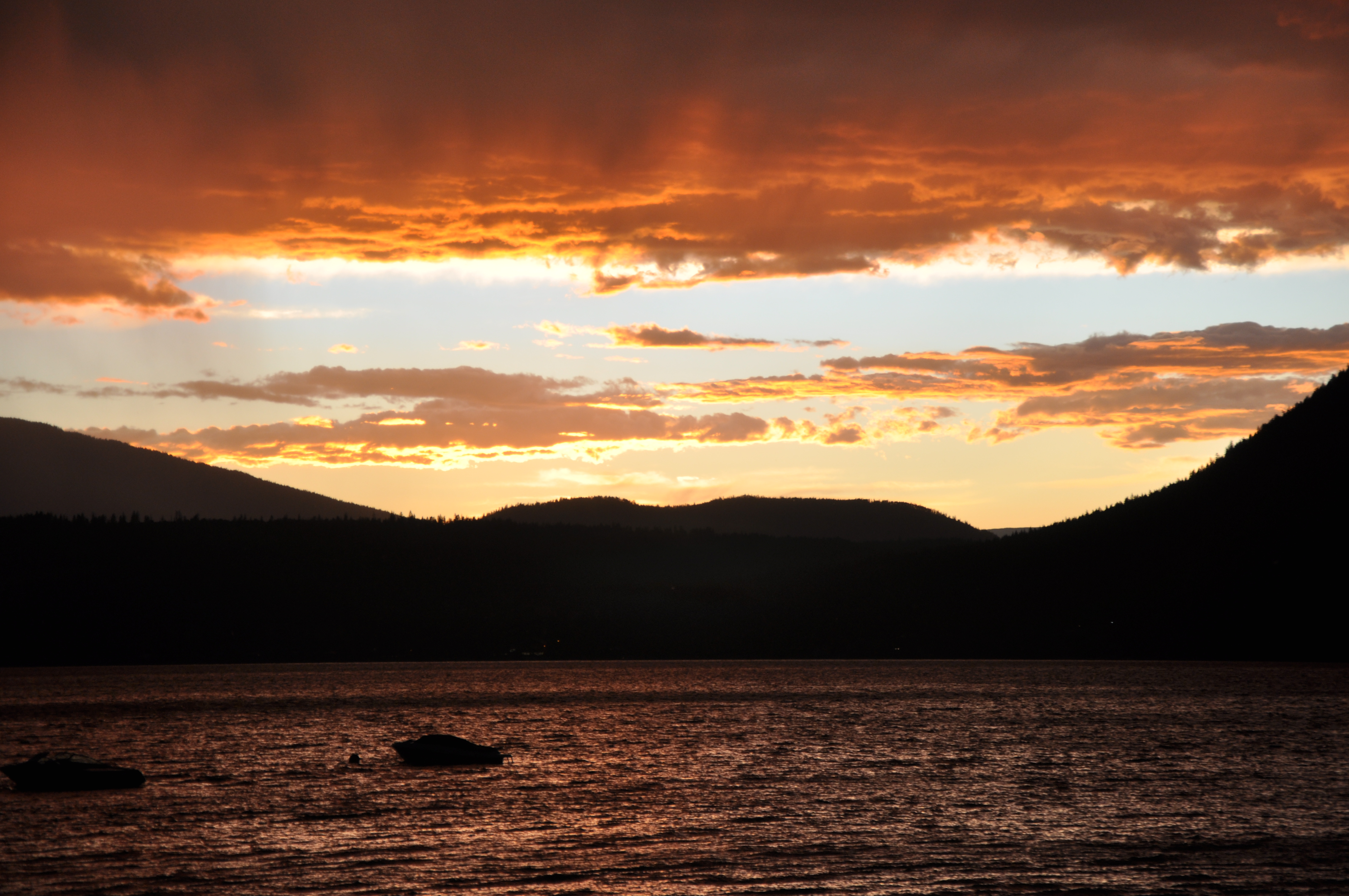
- Sunset over Bastion Mountain, as seen from Canoe Beach
- Interactive map of Canoe
- Coordinates: 50°45′3″N 119°13′39″W
- Country: Canada
- Province: British Columbia
- City: Salmon Arm

Population
  - Total: 1,081

Canoe, British Columbia, is a semi-rural community in British Columbia within the larger City of Salmon Arm. The community lies on the south side of Shuswap Lake, northeast of the city centre, just off the Trans Canada Highway. Canoe is home to the Canoe Forest Products plywood plant, which processes lumber from the surrounding forests for sale and export.

== History ==
The Secwepemc peoples were known to use the mouth of Canoe Creek as a site to launch dugout canoes for travel around Shuswap Lake. The town at Canoe was established in the late 1800s, as the Canadian Pacific Railway was being completed and British Columbia joined confederation with Canada. The local economy was initially based on agriculture and forestry, with an apple-packing plant receiving produce from surrounding farms and exporting via the adjacent railway tracks, bringing much business to the community in the early 1900s.

The Canoe post office opened in 1909, and Canoe has been marked on official maps since at least 1915. The former packing plant sites are now occupied by family housing, but many of the other historical buildings, including the 1919 Victory Hall, a former library, and churches, still stand. The early history on Canoe has been documented in a 1980 limited press book, "The Saga of Canoe, 1888–1938" which features photos of the heritage buildings and founding families, many of which are still present in the community.

== Economy ==
The community hosts numerous local services including a village market, popular cafe, post office, community hall, senior's hall, churches and the North Canoe Elementary School. Most residents of Canoe work in Salmon Arm, which is only a 7-minute drive out of the community, though some businesses operate in Canoe including Canoe Plumbing, several hairdressers, a violin school and other home-based businesses. Canoe Forest Products Ltd. operates a plywood plant and is the largest employer in the community. The Salmon Arm water treatment facility is located beside Canoe Beach in a new high tech facility.

== Attractions ==
Canoe's attractions are mainly oriented around summertime tourism, and include a 27-hole executive golf course and restaurant, go-carts and mini-golf, two motels, coffee bistro and roaster, marina, wharf, two boat launches, parks and trails, and a free public beach. The 1919 Victory Hall was recently renovated to host local events and concerts.

Canoe Beach is the only public beach in the immediate Salmon Arm area and draws significant local tourist traffic in summer months. The beach and adjacent park areas host important events for the wider Salmon Arm community, such as seasonal ball tournaments, the CP Holiday Train, and the 150th Canada Day celebration. On January 27, 2010 the Olympic Torch for the 2010 Winter Olympic games made its way through Canoe on day 90 en route to Vancouver. It is thought that the fact that early white travelers were impressed by the dugout canoes drawn up on the beach is the source of the name of this community.
