= Falkland, British Columbia =

Unincorporated community in British Columbia, Canada

Falkland
- Community
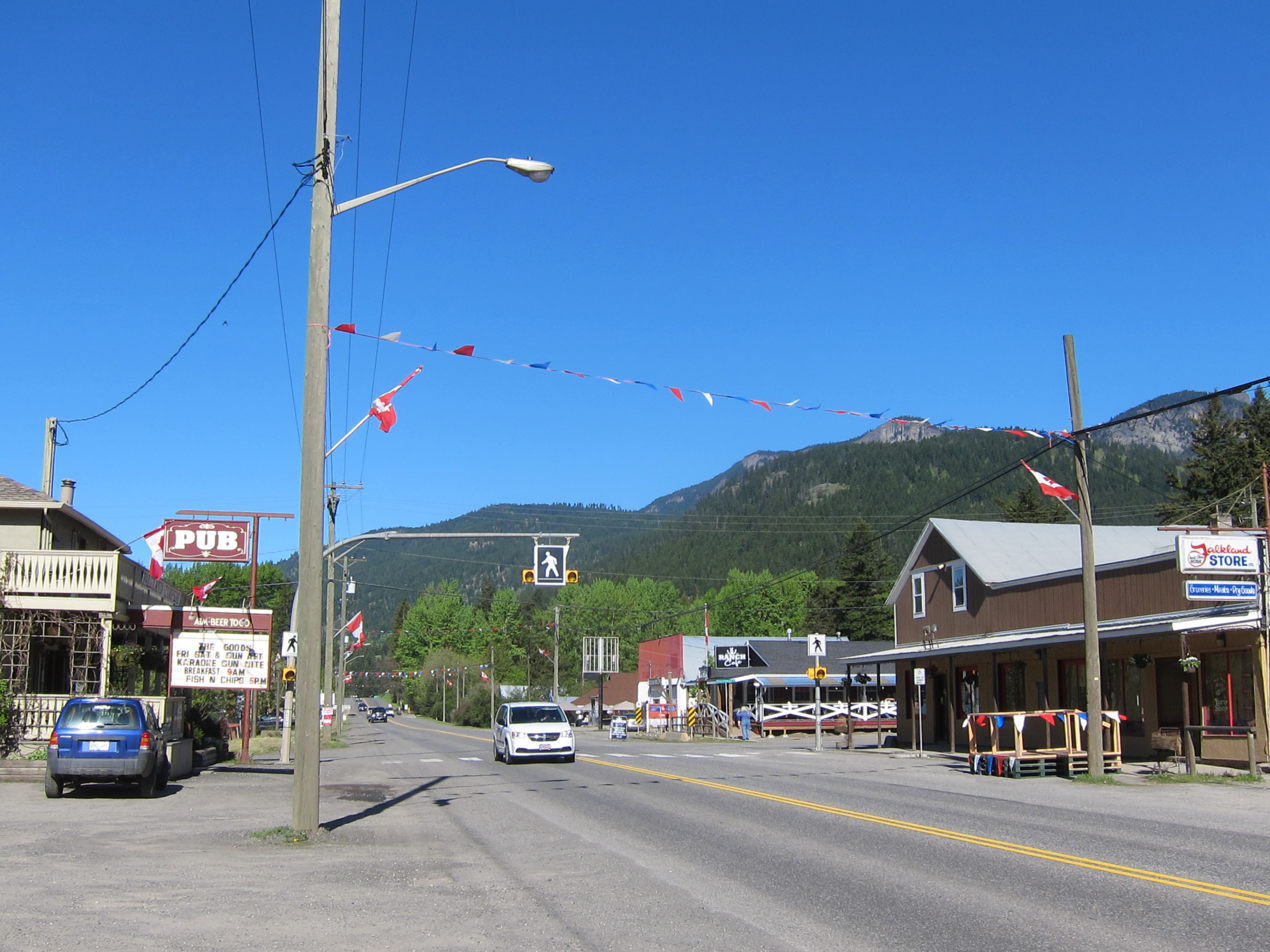
- Downtown Falkland, near the intersection of Highway 97 and the Chase-Falkland Road.

- Location in British Columbia Falkland (Canada)
- Coordinates: 50°30′05″N 119°33′30″W
- Country: Canada
- Province: British Columbia
- Regional district: Columbia-Shuswap

Area
  - Land: 27.7 km^{2} (10.7 sq mi)

Population (2016)
  - Total: 878
  - Density: 31.7/km^{2} (82/sq mi)
- Time zone: UTC−07:00 (PT)
- Postal code: V0E 1W0
- Area codes: 250 / 778 / 236
- Highways: Highway 97

Falkland is an unincorporated community located in the Columbia-Shuswap Regional District of British Columbia, Canada.

Recognized as being home to one of Canada's largest Canadian flags, and the annual Falkland Stampede, the Falkland area has a wide array of lakes, which are used for fishing and recreation.

== Town history ==
Falkland was first settled seasonally by the Interior Salish tribes, who frequently stayed in the region during the summer to gather food for the winter. Located in what's now the Falkland Valley, the Salish named the valley Slahaltkan, meaning "meeting of the winds."

== Naming and European Settlement ==
The name "Falkland" was adopted in honor of Colonel Falkland G.E. Warren of the Royal Horse Artillery. Colonel Warren was an early European settler who established a post office in the valley in 1893. The community's name reflects this connection to a prominent figure in the region's early history.

After retiring from British service, Warren emigrated to Canada in 1893. He settled in the valley that would later bear his name—Falkland, British Columbia. As an early pioneer, he established a post office in the area, contributing to the development of the community of Falkland. Warren also worked for the Canadian Pacific Railway during his time in Canada.

== Economic Development ==
The Falkland Gypsum Mine began operations in 1926. This mine played a significant role in the local economy, providing employment and contributing to the region's development. Currently owned by Lafarge, the mine continues to operate, demonstrating the community's ongoing reliance on natural resource industries.

== Falkland in the News ==
On October 31, 2024, an illicit drug superlab, described as "the largest and most sophisticated drug superlab in Canada," was discovered and seized by a specialized RCMP unit on a remote 66-hecatre property 10 km (6.2 mi) southeast of Falkland. 54 kilograms of finished fentanyl, 390 kilograms of methamphetamine, 35 kilograms of cocaine, 15 kilograms of MDMA, and six kilograms of cannabis were seized, alongside 89 firearms, several explosive devices, massive amounts of ammunition, firearm silencers, high-capacity magazines, body armor and $500,000 in cash. It is estimated the total worth of all the seized items is around CAN$485 million (US$347 million).

== The Falkland Stampede ==
The Falkland Stampede is an annual rodeo, exhibition, and festival that was first held on March 24, 1919.

== Falkland's Canadian flag ==
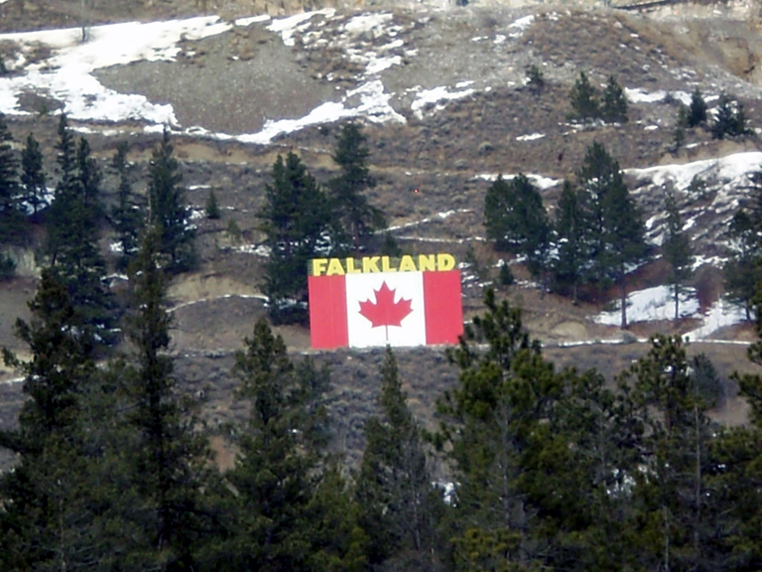
Falkland flag

Falkland's Canadian flag was built to support the 'I Care' campaign, which gained international attention after the people of Falkland challenged the rest of Canada to fly the Canadian flag.

The Canadian flag is located 152.4 metres (500 feet) above the Falkland Valley floor, on Gyp Mountain. It is illuminated at night, allowing visitors of Falkland to view the flag at any time. The power reaches the flag from an extension cord.

== Location ==
Falkland is located on the confluence of three valleys and two rivers, the Salmon River and the Bolean Creek. It is bordered by Tuktakamin Mountain to the south, and Estekawalan Mountain to the west.
