= Blind Bay, British Columbia =

Blind Bay
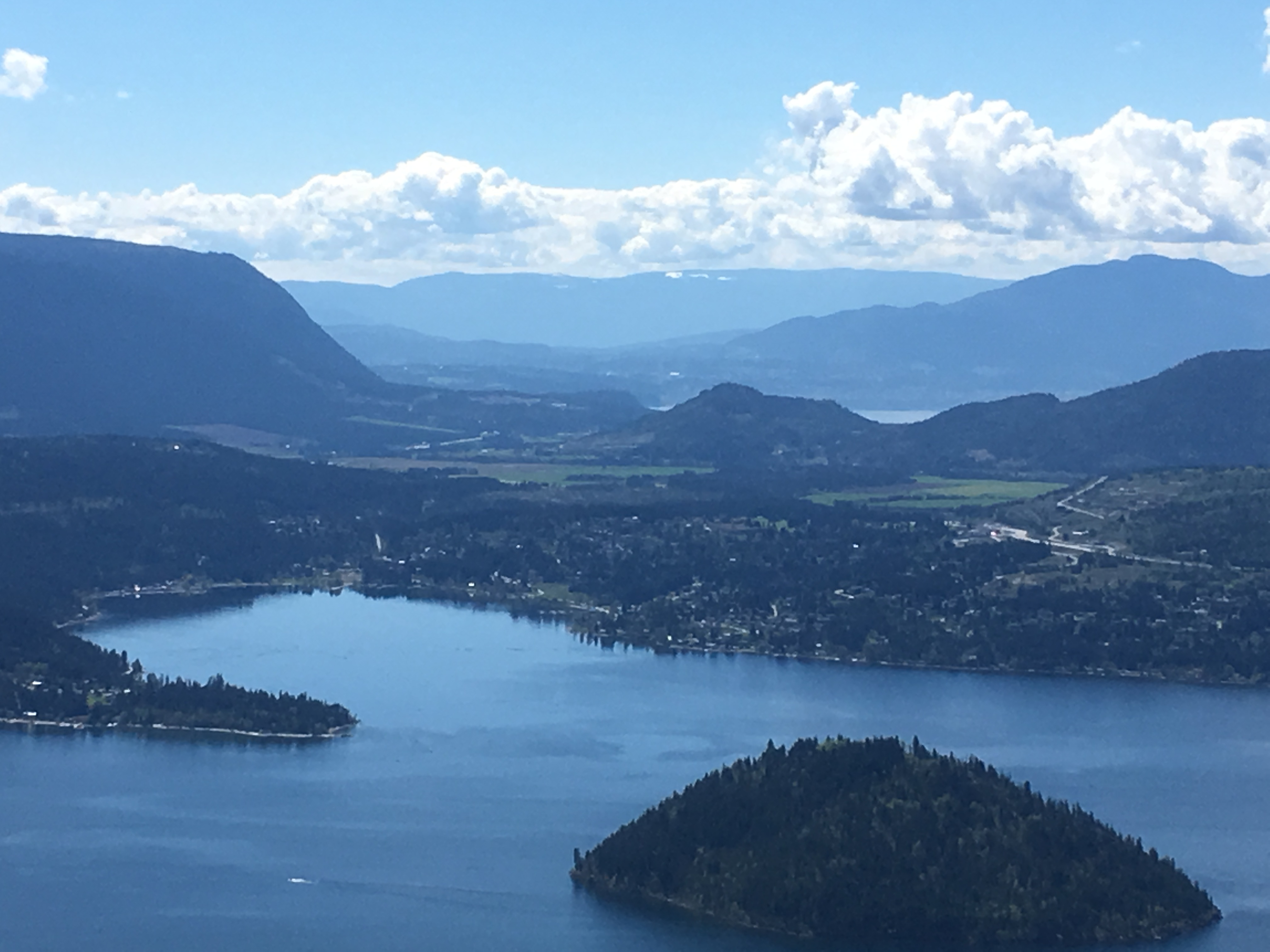
- Motto: Where Strangers become Friends
- Location of Blind Bay in British Columbia
- Coordinates: 50°53′00″N 119°23′00″W
- Country: Canada
- Province: British Columbia

Population (2021)
  - Total: 2,369
- Time zone: UTC−07:00 (PT)
- Area codes: 250, 778

Blind Bay is an unincorporated settlement located on the bay of the same name, at the southwest end of Shuswap Lake in the Shuswap region of the Southern Interior of British Columbia, Canada.

Part of Blind Bay is a golf course community with numerous other recreation activities including a grass air strip, tennis, pickleball, hiking, and model airplane flying.

At the 2021 census, the population of Blind Bay was 2,369.
