= Scotch Creek, British Columbia =

Scotch Creek
- Location of Scotch Creek in British Columbia
- Coordinates: 50°54′40″N 119°26′50″W
- Country: Canada
- Province: British Columbia
- Time zone: UTC−07:00 (PT)
- Postal code: V0E 1M5
- Area codes: 250, 778

Scotch Creek (Shuswap: Cemetetkwe) is a small community in British Columbia based on summer tourism located on the shores of Shuswap Lake at the mouth of the creek of the same name.

Traditionally, Cemetetkwe was important for hunting, berry picking, cedar roots and birch bark for baskets.

Scotch Creek is home to Shuswap Lake Provincial Park. The park operates at capacity from early July to Labour Day (early September). The park is on the old delta of Scotch Creek. The park is directly across from Copper Island, which is 1.3 kilometres offshore.

In 2023, the Bush Creek East wildfire burned into the community, destroying homes and the Scotch Creek firehall.
