= Celista =

Coordinates: 50°57′00″N 119°21′00″W

Celista is a small community located along the north shore of Shuswap Lake in British Columbia, Canada.

The local school is North Shuswap Elementary school, which has grades one to eight and has an annual enrollment of just over 100 students. The community exists along the Squilax-Anglemont Highway and consists of residential and recreational housing along a pristine beach. Businesses include a garage, convenient store and a church that also operates a thrift store. Multiple boat launches also cater to the lakes wider recreation activities. In recent years the exploding tourism industry has taken over and the majority of the residences are now owned for summer use only. Local residents have notable self pride and most are employed by local cash crops ranging in species as well as seasonal work. Other notable establishments within the community include: Celista Hall, used to host local meetings as well as the "coffee house" (a display of local musical talent) throughout the year. The Hall is also home to the Farmers Market during the summer season. The area also holds a variety of hiking and walking trails including the Onyx Falls trail.

The community took a devastating hit from the 2023 Bush Creek East wildfire which burnt a significant amount of houses and disrupted local life and tourism.

== Name origin ==
The name is an adaptation of that of William Selesta, "the last of the Indian doctors", of the Neskonlith reserve, who died in 1948 near the age of 100. The name was originally applied to Celista Creek and used for the name of the settlement by one of its first residents.

== Climate ==
Climate data for Celista
Month	Jan	Feb	Mar	Apr	May	Jun	Jul	Aug	Sep	Oct	Nov	Dec	Year
Record high °C (°F)	13.0 (55.4)	12.0 (53.6)	20.0 (68.0)	26.0 (78.8)	32.0 (89.6)	37.0 (98.6)	37.0 (98.6)	37.5 (99.5)	33.0 (91.4)	24.0 (75.2)	15.0 (59.0)	8.0 (46.4)	37.5 (99.5)
Mean daily maximum °C (°F)	−1.1 (30.0)	1.3 (34.3)	6.8 (44.2)	14.0 (57.2)	18.7 (65.7)	22.4 (72.3)	25.8 (78.4)	25.4 (77.7)	19.3 (66.7)	10.3 (50.5)	3.4 (38.1)	−0.7 (30.7)	12.1 (53.8)
Daily mean °C (°F)	−3.8 (25.2)	−2.5 (27.5)	2.0 (35.6)	7.7 (45.9)	12.1 (53.8)	15.7 (60.3)	18.5 (65.3)	17.9 (64.2)	12.7 (54.9)	6.0 (42.8)	0.8 (33.4)	−3.1 (26.4)	7.0 (44.6)
Mean daily minimum °C (°F)	−6.6 (20.1)	−6.2 (20.8)	−2.9 (26.8)	1.4 (34.5)	5.5 (41.9)	9.0 (48.2)	11.2 (52.2)	10.4 (50.7)	6.2 (43.2)	1.6 (34.9)	−1.9 (28.6)	−5.4 (22.3)	1.9 (35.4)
Record low °C (°F)	−29.0 (−20.2)	−29.0 (−20.2)	−19.0 (−2.2)	−8.0 (17.6)	−3.0 (26.6)	−1.0 (30.2)	5.0 (41.0)	3.0 (37.4)	−2.0 (28.4)	−14.0 (6.8)	−19.5 (−3.1)	−32.0 (−25.6)	−32.0 (−25.6)
Average precipitation mm (inches)	84.7 (3.33)	42.9 (1.69)	45.5 (1.79)	42.0 (1.65)	64.4 (2.54)	65.9 (2.59)	53.7 (2.11)	46.0 (1.81)	43.3 (1.70)	62.4 (2.46)	90.4 (3.56)	98.0 (3.86)	739.2 (29.09)
Average rainfall mm (inches)	18.3 (0.72)	17.9 (0.70)	30.5 (1.20)	41.8 (1.65)	64.4 (2.54)	65.9 (2.59)	53.7 (2.11)	46.0 (1.81)	43.3 (1.70)	61.8 (2.43)	53.0 (2.09)	18.7 (0.74)	515.3 (20.28)
Average snowfall cm (inches)	66.3 (26.1)	24.9 (9.8)	15.0 (5.9)	0.2 (0.1)	0 (0)	0 (0)	0 (0)	0 (0)	0 (0)	0.6 (0.2)	37.5 (14.8)	79.3 (31.2)	223.8 (88.1)
Average precipitation days (≥ 0.2 mm)	12.7	8.5	9.3	8.8	11.5	10.9	8.7	6.9	7.2	11.8	13.5	13.1	122.9
Average rainy days (≥ 0.2 mm)	3.7	4.3	6.8	8.8	11.5	10.9	8.7	6.9	7.2	11.8	8.9	3.7	93.2
Average snowy days (≥ 0.2 cm)	10.6	5.5	3.4	0.11	0	0	0	0	0	0.33	5.9	10.5	36.34
Source: Environment Canada

== See also ==
- List of place names in Canada of Aboriginal origin
