= Shuswap Lake =

Lake in British Columbia, Canada

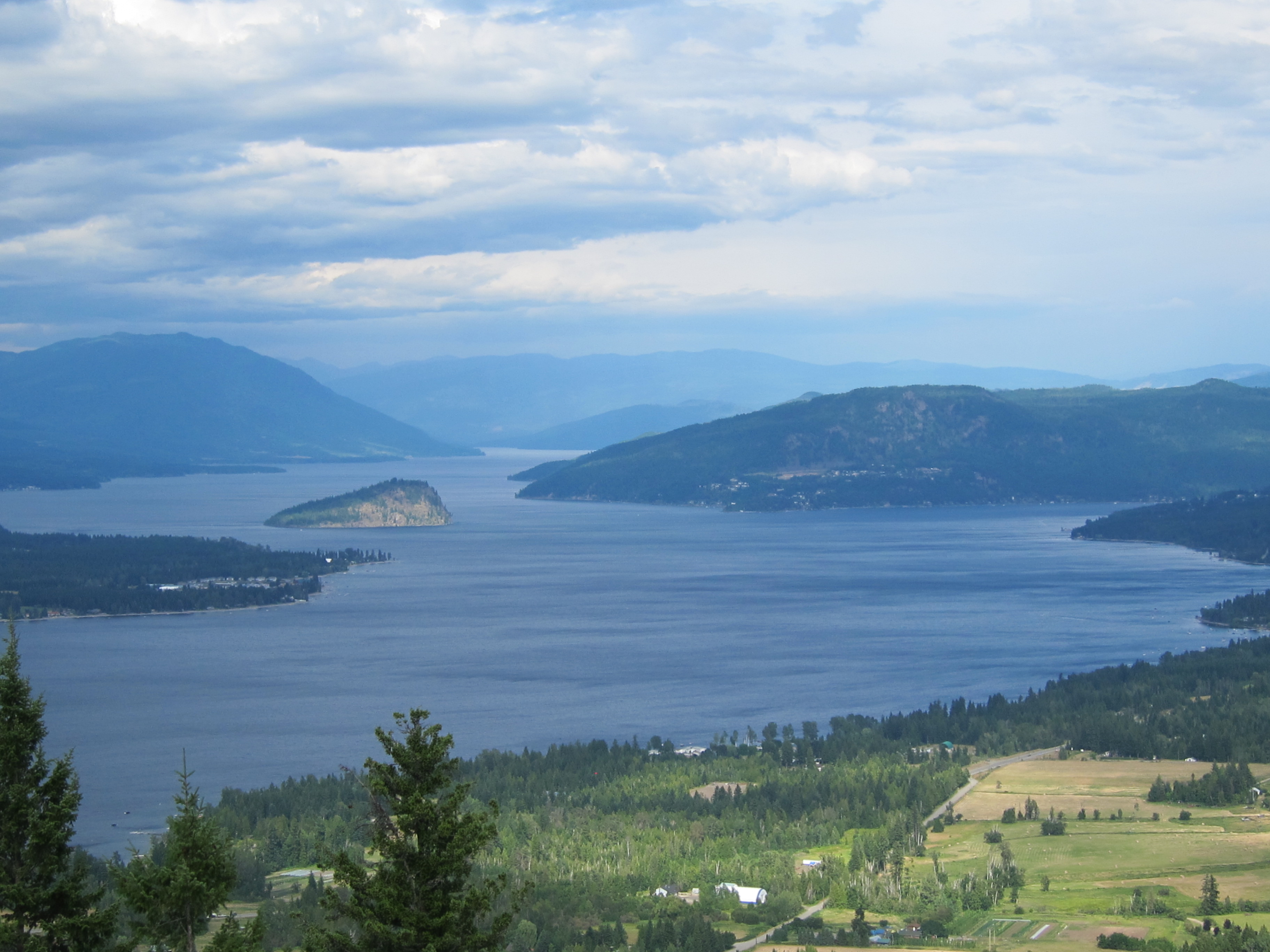
- Western reaches of Shuswap Lake

- Location within British Columbia

- The three arms of Shuswap Lake
- Location: South-Central British Columbia
- Coordinates: 50°59′N 119°1′W
- Type: Lake
- Primary inflows: Adams River, Scotch Creek, Seymour River, Anstey River, Eagle River, Shuswap River (via Mara Lake/Sicamous Narrows), Salmon River
- Primary outflows: Little River
- Catchment area: 17,478 km^{2} (6,748 sq mi)
- Basin countries: Canada
- Max. length: 89 km (55 mi)
- Max. width: 5 km (3.1 mi)
- Surface area: 310 km^{2} (120 sq mi)
- Average depth: 61.6 m (202 ft)
- Max. depth: 161 m (528 ft)
- Water volume: 19.1 km^{3} (4.6 cu mi)
- Residence time: 2.1 years
- Shore length^{1}: 342 km (213 mi)
- Surface elevation: 347 m (1,138 ft)
- Islands: Copper
- Settlements: (see article)
- ^{1} Shore length is not a well-defined measure.

Shuswap Lake (pronounced /ˈʃuːʃwɑːp/ SHOOSH-wahp) is a lake located in the southern interior of British Columbia, Canada that drains via the Little River into Little Shuswap Lake. Little Shuswap Lake is the source of the South Thompson River, a branch of the Thompson River, a tributary of the Fraser River. It is at the heart of a region known as the Columbia Shuswap or "the Shuswap", noted for its recreational lakeshore communities including the city of Salmon Arm. The name "Shuswap" is derived from the Shuswap or Secwepemc First Nations people, the most northern of the Interior Salish peoples, whose territory includes the Shuswap. The Shuswap call themselves /ʃǝxwépmǝx/ in their own language, which is called /ʃǝxwepmǝxtʃín/.

== Geography ==
Shuswap Lake is located in the southern Interior region of the province at the boundary of the Shuswap Highland and the Monashee Range, a sub-range of the Columbia Mountains.

The lake consists of four arms, forming a shape reminiscent of the letter H. The four arms are called Salmon Arm (southwest), Shuswap Arm or Main Arm (west), Anstey Arm (northeast), and Seymour Arm (north). Shuswap Lake connects to Little Shuswap Lake via the Little River, which flows from the end of Shuswap Lake.

To the north-west it is fed by the Adams River, which drains Adams Lake. The Salmon Arm of Shuswap Lake connects to Mara Lake at the Sicamous Channel. The Shuswap River connects via Mara Lake. In the south-west the Salmon River flows into the lake at Salmon Arm. The Eagle River runs down from the Eagle Pass in the Monashees to enter the lake at Sicamous, in the east. The Seymour River empties into the northern end of the Seymour Arm. In addition to these rivers, numerous creeks feed the lake, including Scotch Creek, which runs south to the north shore of the main arm, near the community of the same name.

== Geology ==
The central interior plateau of British Columbia drained by the Fraser and Columbia rivers is part of the Shuswap terrane in British Columbia and northern Washington state. It is dissected by numerous elongated, glacially overdeepened lake basins which are formed by the same mechanisms as coastal fjords. Shuswap Lake consists of two, geologically separate basins - Shuswap/Seymour, and Anstey/Salmon Arm.

The metamorphic bedrock in the area is classified as the Shuswap terrane, and is the result of tectonic buildup of rock in western North America in the Mesozoic era.

=== Glacial lakes ===
From 14000-10000 BCE, at the end of the last glacial maximum, several large glacial lakes formed in the region as ice melt was trapped by the remnants of the ice sheets that had previously covered the area. Glacial Lake Kamloops extended over the Shuswap Lake area, with depths up to 1,000 metres (3,300 ft) above the current surface elevation.

== Hydrology ==
The lake sits at 347 metres (1,138 ft) above sea level, and has a surface area of 310 square kilometres (120 sq mi). The lakeshore has a perimeter of 342 kilometres (213 mi). The mean depth of the lake is 62 metres (203 ft) and its maximum depth reaches 171 metres (561 ft) in Seymour Arm. The Cinnemosun Narrows, where the two basins of the lake join, is only 5 metres (16 ft) deep. The average volume of the lake is 19 cubic kilometres (4.6 cu mi) and water remains in the lake for an average of 2.1 years.

There are 34 permanent streams and rivers that feed into the lake. The three largest inflows by mean annual discharge are from the Shuswap River, the Adams River, and the Seymour River. The lake has a large watershed for its size and drains 17,478 square kilometres (6,748 sq mi) of the surrounding area. The lake's single outflow is the Little River.

Water quality in the lake is generally clear and cold, with low nutrient levels. It is considered oligotrophic, with the exception of Salmon Arm, which has higher levels of nutrients and algae due to agricultural activities in the Salmon River valley. Lake levels vary according to season, with about a 3-metre (9.8 ft) difference between the lowest levels, usually in March or April, and the highest, typically in late June or early July. The lake water is thermally stratified in the summer months and experiences turnover during the fall and winter. The lake rarely develops full ice cover during the winter.

== Ecology ==
=== Fish ===
Shuswap Lake is home to 30 species of fish. Of these species, the Chinook salmon, Coho salmon, Sockeye salmon, Rainbow trout, Lake trout, and Burbot are of importance regarding recreational fishing. Carp are an invasive fish present in lake waters.

=== Invasive Species ===
Eurasian water milfoil has spread across much of the lake, but is most prevalent in Salmon Arm Bay.

== Monster ==
Like many other lakes, Shuswap Lake has a local lake monster legend attached to it. An eight-metre (25-foot)-long serpentine creature, known as the Shuswap Lake Monster, "Shugumu", or "Shuswaggi", is reported to live in the lake.

== Provincial parks around Shuswap Lake ==
Several parks are located on the shores of Shuswap Lake, including Shuswap Lake Provincial Park and Tsútswecw Provincial Park on the main arm of the lake, Silver Beach Provincial Park on Seymour Arm, Herald Provincial Park and Sunnybrae Provincial Park on Salmon Arm, and Cinnemousun Narrows Provincial Park at the narrows where the four arms meet. Shuswap Lake Marine Provincial Park is a system of 23 different campsites located on beaches throughout the lake.

== Communities ==
The largest settlement on the lake is the city of Salmon Arm on the arm with the same name. This arm is also home to Tappen, Sunnybrae, Canoe and Sicamous, the second-largest town. Communities on the north shore of Shuswap Lake include Celista, Lee Creek, Salmon Arm, Squilax, Scotch Creek, Anglemont, Magna Bay, and St. Ives. Eagle Bay, Sorrento, Blind Bay are on the south shore of the main arm of the lake. Seymour Arm is the only settlement on Seymour Arm. Anstey Arm is unpopulated.

== See also ==
- List of lakes of British Columbia
