= Sorrento, British Columbia =

Community in British Columbia, Canada

Sorrento
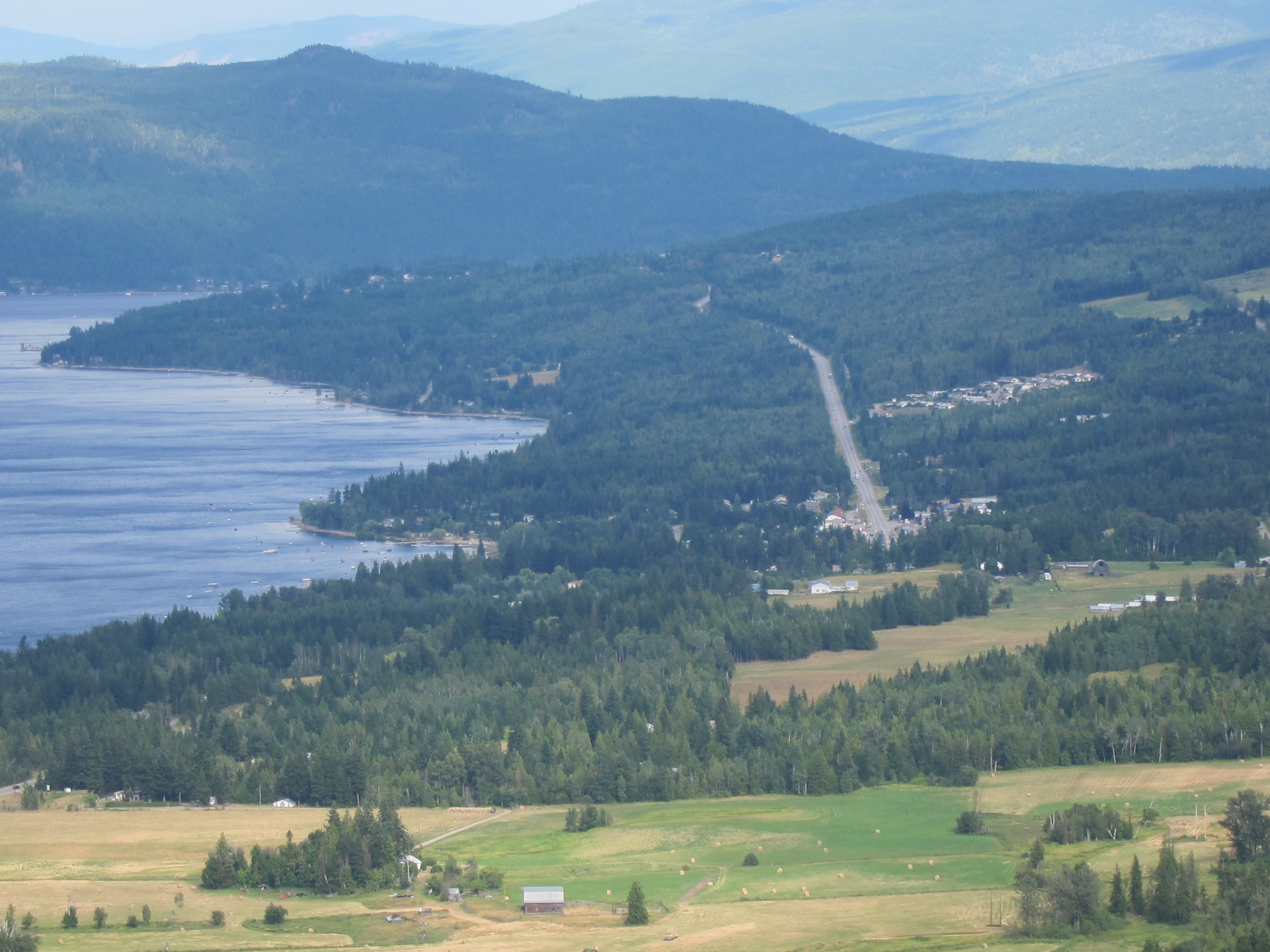
- Sorrento and the Trans Canada Highway

- Location of Sorrento in British Columbia
- Coordinates: 50°52′38″N 119°28′14″W
- Country: Canada
- Province: British Columbia
- Time zone: UTC−07:00 (PT)
- Postal codes: V0E 2W0 & V0E 3W0

Sorrento is an unincorporated settlement located on the south shore of Shuswap Lake in the Southern Interior of the Canadian province of British Columbia. It is located on the Trans-Canada Highway, and is approximately 20 kilometres (12 mi) southeast of the town of Chase and 32 kilometres (20 mi) northwest of the city of Salmon Arm. Sorrento is in the Columbia-Shuswap G electoral region of the Columbia-Shuswap Regional District.

== History ==
The name of the townsite was changed from Trapper's Landing to Sorrento by resident J.R. Kinghorn, who saw a physical resemblance between Copper Island, which lies across Shuswap Lake, and the Isle of Capri as seen from the city of Sorrento, Italy.

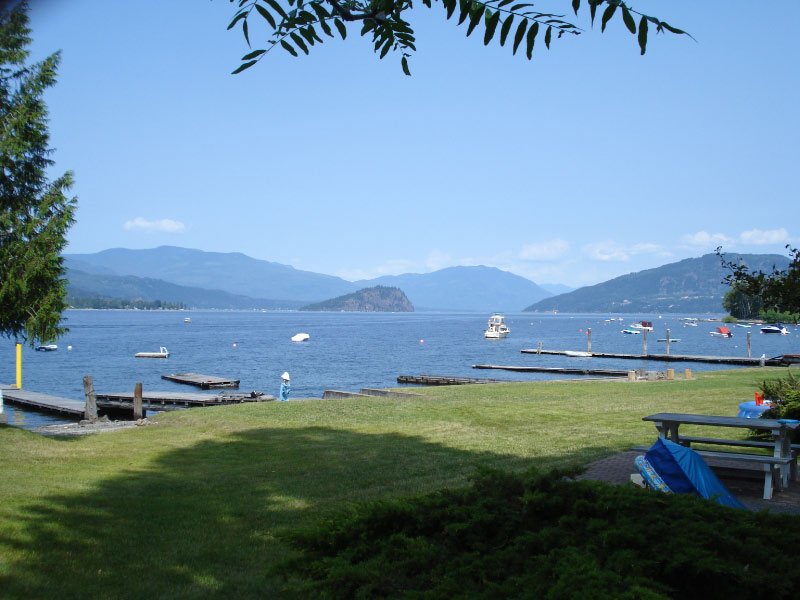
Shuswap Lake and Copper Island as seen from Sorrento

== Festivals ==
Sorrento hosts the Shuswap Lake Festival of the Arts in July, and the Sorrento Bluegrass Festival in late August.

== Climate ==
Climate data for Sorrento
Month	Jan	Feb	Mar	Apr	May	Jun	Jul	Aug	Sep	Oct	Nov	Dec	Year
Record high °C (°F)	13.5 (56.3)	12.0 (53.6)	16.5 (61.7)	28.9 (84.0)	32.5 (90.5)	33.0 (91.4)	49.8 (121.6)	35.6 (96.1)	29.5 (85.1)	25.0 (77.0)	19.4 (66.9)	10.5 (50.9)	37.0 (98.6)
Mean daily maximum °C (°F)	−1.9 (28.6)	0.8 (33.4)	6.8 (44.2)	13.3 (55.9)	18.3 (64.9)	22.0 (71.6)	25.3 (77.5)	24.8 (76.6)	17.9 (64.2)	10.5 (50.9)	3.2 (37.8)	−1.2 (29.8)	11.6 (52.9)
Daily mean °C (°F)	−4.2 (24.4)	−2.1 (28.2)	2.6 (36.7)	7.6 (45.7)	12.3 (54.1)	16.1 (61.0)	18.9 (66.0)	18.7 (65.7)	13.0 (55.4)	6.9 (44.4)	0.9 (33.6)	−3.3 (26.1)	7.3 (45.1)
Mean daily minimum °C (°F)	−6.4 (20.5)	−4.9 (23.2)	−1.7 (28.9)	1.8 (35.2)	6.3 (43.3)	10.2 (50.4)	12.5 (54.5)	12.5 (54.5)	8.0 (46.4)	3.3 (37.9)	−1.4 (29.5)	−5.1 (22.8)	2.9 (37.2)
Record low °C (°F)	−27.2 (−17.0)	−23.0 (−9.4)	−19.4 (−2.9)	−7.8 (18.0)	−1.1 (30.0)	2.5 (36.5)	4.4 (39.9)	3.5 (38.3)	−1.5 (29.3)	−16.0 (3.2)	−27.0 (−16.6)	−25.5 (−13.9)	−27.2 (−17.0)
Average precipitation mm (inches)	55.0 (2.17)	46.2 (1.82)	32.9 (1.30)	28.4 (1.12)	45.5 (1.79)	49.0 (1.93)	43.4 (1.71)	39.7 (1.56)	40.5 (1.59)	36.9 (1.45)	59.9 (2.36)	71.4 (2.81)	548.7 (21.60)
Source: Environment Canada
