= Stswecemʼc Xgetʼtem First Nation =

First Nation government in British Columbia, Canada

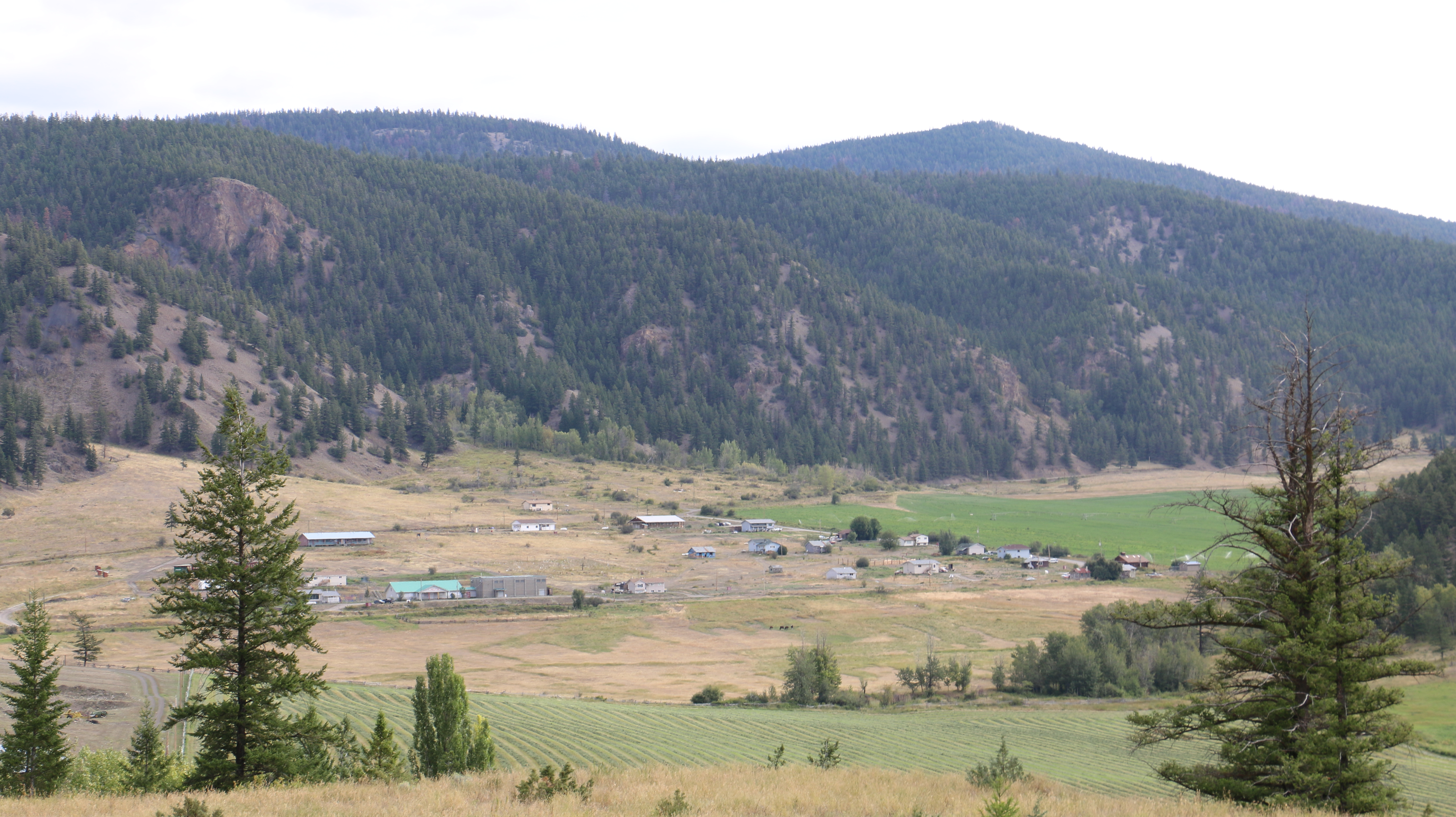
Canoe Creek

The Stswecemʼc Xgetʼtem First Nation, formerly known as Canoe Creek Band/Dog Creek Indian Band, created as a result of merger of the Canoe Creek Band and Dog Creek Band is a First Nations government of the Secwepemc (Shuswap) Nation, located in the Fraser Canyon-Cariboo region of the Central Interior of the Canadian province of British Columbia. It was created when the government of the then-Colony of British Columbia established an Indian reserve system in the 1860s. It is a member government of the Northern Shuswap Tribal Council.

The territory of the band spans the Fraser River and is around the basins of Dog Creek, across from Gang Ranch, and Canoe Creek to the east of the river, and its canyon in between. The area is to the west of 100 Mile House and south of the city of Willams Lake and the reserves of the Alkali Lake First Nation in between.

The Stswecemʼc Xgetʼtem First Nation has not signed any treaty with any settler-colonial political entity, nor has it ceded any land and let go its territorial claims. As part of the Northern Secwepemc te Qelmucw (Tribal Council), Stswecemʼc Xgetʼtem First Nation has been in negotiation with the government of Canada and the government of British Columbia regarding a final treaty settling this matter. An "Agreement in Principle" was signed in 2018. Once a final agreement is signed between the Tribal Council, Canada, and British Columbia, it is expected that the Indian Reserves will be abolished, the territories under jurisdiction of Stswecemʼc Xgetʼtem First Nation will expand significantly, and former reserves will be absorbed into settlement land under sovereignty of Stswecemʼc Xgetʼtem First Nation.

== Indian Reserves ==
Indian Reserves under the administration of the band are: As explained before, these reserves were unilaterally defined by the Government of British Columbia, and thus the Nation has never retracted its claim on its territory. These reserves are expected to be abolished and absorbed into settlement lands, after the signing of a final agreement.

- Canoe Creek Indian Reserve No. 1, 37.2 ha., on Canoe Creek 5 miles NE of its confluence with the Fraser River 51°28′00″N 122°08′00″W
- Canoe Creek Indian Reserve No. 2, 1804.9 ha., on Canoe Creek 6 miles east of its confluence with the Fraser River 51°26′00″N 122°03′00″W
- Canoe Creek Indian Reserve No. 3, 2804.9 ha., on the Fraser River 4 miles south of the confluence of Dog Creek 51°32′00″N 122°15′00″W
- Copper Johnny Meadow Indian Reserve No. 8, 32.4 ha. 16 miles northwest of 70 Mile House Post Office 51°23′00″N 121°45′00″W
- Dog Creek Indian Reserve No. 1, 144.7 ha., on Dog Creek 4 miles east of its confluence with the Fraser River 51°35′00″N 122°13′00″W
- Dog Creek Indian Reserve No. 2, 218.5 ha., on Dog Creek 8 miles east of its confluence with the Fraser River 51°36′00″N 122°05′00″W
- Dog Creek Indian Reserve No. 3, 8.1 ha, on Dog Creek 10 miles east of its confluence with the Fraser River 51°37′00″N 122°04′00″W
- Dog Creek Indian Reserve No. 4, 183.7 ha., on left bank of Fraser north of the mouth of Dog Creek, south of Wycott's Flat IR No. 6 of the Alkali Lake First Nation 51°36′00″N 122°18′00″W
- Fish Lake Indian Reserve No. 5, 40.9 ha. on west end of Canoe Lake at head of Canoe Creek 51°29′00″N 121°58′00″W
- Spilmouse Indian Reserve No. 4, 161.8, on Canoe Creek 1 mile north of Canoe Creek IR No. 2 51°27′00″N 122°00′00″W
- Tinmusket Indian Reserve No. 5A, 16.2, 7 miles northwest of the 70 Mile House BC Rail station 51°23′00″N 121°30′00″W
- Toby Lake Indian Reserve No. 6, 129.5. ha., on Toby Lake, 3 miles north of Alberta Lake, 11 miles northwest of 70 Mile House 51°23′00″N 121°37′00″W

== Demographics ==
Band population was 180 in 1996, and 265 in 2001.

== Notable citizens ==
- Phyllis Webstad née Jack, Author, First Nations Activist, and the Founder of Orange Shirt Day

== See also ==
- Shuswap Nation Tribal Council
- Gang Ranch
