= Williams Lake =

Williams Lake is the name of several places:

== Canada ==
=== Populated places ===
- Williams Lake, British Columbia, a city in Canada

=== Lakes ===
- Williams Lake (British Columbia), namesake of the city
- Williams Lake (Cumberland), Cumberland County, Nova Scotia
- Williams Lake (Goffs), in Goffs, Nova Scotia
- Williams Lake (Halifax)
- Williams Lake (Jeddore), in Jeddore, Nova Scotia
- Williams Lake (Ontario), located in the Town of Chatsworth, Grey County, Ontario, 23 kilometres south of Owen Sound

=== Other ===
- Williams Lake Indian Reserve, British Columbia
- Williams Lake (Census Agglomeration), British Columbia - A census agglomeration

== United States ==
=== Populated Places ===
- Williams Lake Resort, community in Lemhi County, Idaho

=== Lakes ===
- Williams Lake, Faulkner County, Arkansas
- Williams Lake, Logan County, Arkansas
- Williams Lake, Miller County, Arkansas
- Williams Lake (Colorado), Pitkin County, Colorado
- Williams Lake, Lemhi County, Idaho
- Williams Lake (Indiana), Noble County, Indiana
- Williams Lake (Iowa), Linn County, Iowa
- Williams Lake (Louisiana), Caddo Parish, Louisiana
- Williams Lake (Michigan)
- Williams Lake (Nebraska), Grant County, Nebraska
- Williams Lake (New Mexico), Taos County, New Mexico
- Williams Lake (Ohio), Miami County, Ohio
- Williams Lake (Oregon), Clackamas County, Oregon
- Williams Lake (Tennessee), Shelby County, Tennessee

== See also ==
- Lake Williams (North Dakota), a lake in Kidder County, North Dakota
