= Saint Joseph's Mission (Williams Lake) =

St. Joseph's Mission

Location
- Williams Lake, British Columbia; Canada; 52.061337°N 121.951556°W

Information
- Other name: St. Joseph's Indian Residential School
- Former name: St. Joseph's, Williams Lake Industrial School, Cariboo Indian Industrial School, Cariboo Indian Student Residence, Cariboo Industrial School, Cariboo Student Residence, Caribou Residential School, St. Joseph's Indian residential School, St. Joseph's Industrial School, St. Joseph's Mission School, St. Joseph's Residential School
- Type: Residential School
- Religious affiliations: Roman Catholic Church, Oblates of Mary Immaculate, Sisters of Saint Anne
- Established: July 5, 1867
- Founder: James Maria McGuckin
- Closed: 1981

St. Joseph's Mission was a Catholic mission established near Williams Lake, British Columbia in 1867. The mission was operated by the Missionary Oblates of Mary Immaculate. It is primarily known for the notorious St. Joseph's Indian Residential School located on the property, a part of the Canadian Indian residential school system that operated on the Mission from 1891 to 1981.

During the school's history, many student deaths were recorded which resulted in multiple public inquiries into conditions at the school, as early as 1902. After the school closed, several of its staff members were imprisoned for sexual abuse. A school reunion in 2013 resulted in the creation of Orange Shirt Day, which later became a Canadian statutory holiday.

== Background ==
In 1838, two Catholic priests, François Norbert Blanchet and Modeste Demers, arrived in the Oregon Country to establish the work of the Catholic church in the Pacific Northwest. In 1841, the Missionary Oblates of Mary Immaculate were invited by the Bishop of Montreal, Ignace Bourget, to create missions among the Indigenous peoples of Canada. They quickly established missions across North America, and in the Pacific Northwest. The Catholic missionaries soon found themselves racing against Protestant missionaries to be the first to Christianize Indigenous peoples, and both groups preached against and warned Indigenous peoples against the other. Both groups also lacked manpower and resources, which slowed the work.

The nomadic lifestyle of the First Nations challenged the early Oblate missionaries. To solve this problem, they encouraged the Indigenous to cease their nomadic ways and create farming settlements, preferably in a location far away from other white people, so that the missionaries could act without interference. Pierre-Paul Durieu was instrumental in creating the Oblate strategy for working with Indigenous people, called "Durieu's System". It involved interfering with tribal elections, and creating a "Catholic Indian state" in as many First Nations villages as possible. It involved turning the local chief into an ambassador for the Catholic church, by giving them the authority to enforce religious laws among his people, enforce a ban on tribal celebrations and practices, and to keep white men other than the priests away from the village.

As the Oblates continued their work in the Oregon Territory, they came into conflict with the Catholic priests who had preceded them, and following a decade of conflict, they made the decision to move to New Caledonia (the British portion of the Oregon territory) beginning in 1858, and request that Rome give them the autonomy to conduct their work as they pleased, without interference from local Catholic authorities, which was granted in 1864. The Oblates quickly established missions across the new Colony of British Columbia.

Meanwhile, the First Nations in the region lived essentially undisturbed by colonial settlement, with only the occasional fur trader passing through. The Cariboo region was home to the Secwepemc ("Shuswap"), the Tsilhqotʼin ("Chilcotin"), and the Dakelh ("Carrier") First Nations. Beginning somewhere between 1858 and 1861, the Cariboo Gold Rush sparked a massive wave of immigration into the Cariboo region by white people and Chinese people. In order to support the gold rush, the Cariboo Road was constructed between 1860 and 1863, which brought gold miners and other settlers into the Cariboo region. The settlers also brought smallpox; an epidemic in 1862-63 wiped out many of the Indigenous people in the Cariboo. The Tsilhqot'in people responded to the construction of the road by starting the Chilcotin War, which resulted in an attack on a construction crew and the subsequent hanging of five Tsilhqot'in chiefs.

== History ==
=== Founding the mission ===
In 1860, James Maria McGuckin joined the Oblates of Mary Immaculate in Yorkshire, England. In 1863, he arrived in Victoria, British Columbia, where he was ordained as a priest and became the vice principal of an Oblate-run school. In 1866, the Oblates sent him to the Cariboo to establish a mission among the First Nations. He first arrived in Richfield, British Columbia, where he was asked to provide services to Irish and French gold-miners, who eventually raised funds to build a church in Richfield. However, as this was not his primary mission, he quickly moved on. In 1864, two Oblate priests made a journey to the Cariboo, where they proposed Quesnel, British Columbia or Soda Creek as the ideal sites for the future mission.

In July 1866, Father Charles Grandidier made a journey to the Cariboo, and proposed two alternate locations for the mission: Pomeroy's farm along the San Jose River, near Williams Lake, not far from a Secwepemc settlement at modern-day Williams Lake; or a location near 141 Mile house. Father James McGuckin selected Pomeroy's farm, because it was located halfway between the major Secwepemc settlements at Soda Creek and Alkali Lake; it was also fairly close to Quesnel, a gathering place for the Dakelh and Tsilqot'in. It was also far enough away from Richfield to prevent any meddling by the gold-miners.

When Mr. Pomeroy found out the Catholic church wanted to buy his farm, he raised his price; after unfruitful negotiating, two other men bought Pomeroy's farm at the original cost, and re-sold it to the Oblates at the same price they paid for it, in April 1867. The two men planted a wheat crop and added a milk cow prior to turning the property over to the Oblates.

On July 5, 1867, St. Joseph's Mission was founded. The priests’ initial excursions among the Indigenous peoples were very successful, and ten churches and chapels were blessed in the Cariboo before the end of the first year, most of them Indigenous. The priests were aided in their efforts by reports of a miracle in which a Soda Creek woman was raised from the dead in order to receive baptism, after which she once again died.

The priests found that they could usurp Secwepemc deities the "Old-One" and the "Coyote" as "God the Father" and "Jesus", and as the Old-One sent messengers on occasion, they claimed to be his messengers and were thus able to convert the Secwepemc people. Likewise, the priests usurped Dakelh religious beliefs in their efforts to convert the Dakelh people. However, the priests were unable to find any syncretism between Catholic and Tsilhqot'in religious beliefs, and while they had some success evangelizing the Tsilhqot'in, it was much more difficult, and there was resistance to the mission's efforts until the 1940s.

In evangelizing the Cariboo First Nations, the Catholic missionaries faced no competition from Protestant missionaries, who had arrived with the gold rush and left when it ended, giving St. Joseph's Mission a monopoly on Indigenous missionary work in the Cariboo for many decades.

Initially the mission engaged in ranching and farming in order to become self-sustaining, but also as a means of building connections into the nearby community. Father McGuckin pre-empted and purchased hundreds of acres surrounding the mission to increase its agricultural potential, by 1881, the Mission was 1600 acres, and had secured water rights for 100 years. As they lacked sufficient Oblate brothers to farm the land, they hired local Catholics and Indigenous people to work the land. However, contractual disputes cost the mission hundreds of dollars, forcing the Oblates to find a way to farm the land themselves.

The mission was located on good farmland, and by 1876 the mission donated $850 annually towards the cost of running Oblate schools in other parts of the province; in 1918, St. Joseph's mission was considered the primary financial support of all Oblate mission work in British Columbia. The mission was responsible for recording births and deaths in the area.

=== First school ===
The promise of an education and laws that made it mandatory for First Nations peoples to attend, many kids having been taken from their homes by force, many times when parents were not home to put up a fight, was an important factor in the Indigenous peoples' decision to convert to Catholicism, as they were eager to obtain an education for their children and the Oblate priests took it as an opportunity to wreak havoc on their communities and culture . The Oblate leadership decided to open a school at the Mission for Indigenous boys as early as 1869. However, Father McGuckin found this news unwelcome, despite the promises he had made to the Indigenous peoples while securing their conversion, as he had made a promise to local settlers open a school for white children, and did not believe that the mission had sufficient funds to operate two schools. He was also appalled at the idea of sending white and Indigenous children to the same school. Father McGuckin won the argument, and in 1871, it was decided to build a school for white children at St. Joseph's; the Sisters of Saint Anne were asked to send nuns to teach at the school.

In 1871, Father Charles Grandidier became the head of the mission, and work began on building a boarding school. The Sisters of Saint Anne at first rejected the request to send nuns, as they did not have any nuns to spare. Without teachers, the school faced delays in opening. At the same time, the government was constructing a school at Cache Creek and proposed a school at Soda Creek that threatened to take potential students away from St. Joseph's; as a result, Father McGuckin made the decision to open the school himself, as a boys school, on December 9, 1873, six months before the school at Cache Creek would be ready. Seven students were ready on the first day of school, but the school grew quickly, as it was the only school in the Cariboo. The school developed a reputation for quality, and as many as twelve students transferred from the government's Cache Creek school to St. Joseph's. While it was a boys-only school at first, the priests were forced to accept a girl who had been sent with her brothers to the school; and when they tried to reject her attendance the following school year, her parents threatened to send her to the government school. In 1876 the Sisters of Saint Anne agreed to send nuns to the mission and they opened a girls school. By 1878, the two schools had a combined enrollment of 75 white and métis students. In addition to academic subjects, the school taught domestic skills to the girls and agricultural trades to the boys.The poverty in the Cariboo led many students' families to fall behind in tuition payments; the school continued to allow their attendance, not wanting the children to be exposed to immorality at a government school.

St. Joseph's also became a school to prepare young men to join the priesthood as Oblates. The first priest-in-training was sent in 1874. In 1877, a number of graduates of St. Joseph's requested to study to join the priesthood, and they began their studies at St. Joseph's; William Murphy of Lac La Hache was the first to complete his training, in 1882, and join the Oblate order. A few men in Ireland who did not have enough funds to immigrate to Canada had their journey across the Atlantic paid for, on the condition that they study to join the priesthood at St. Joseph's.

== Conversion to an Indian residential school ==
=== Indigenous-Mission relations ===
The two schools occupied the attention of most of the Oblates at the Mission. Father LeJacq was transferred to a new mission further north in 1873, and replaced by Father Marchal, who was less strict than Father LeJacq, and allowed Chief William of the Williams Lake First Nation, for whom the city of Williams Lake was later named, to sing traditional Secwepemc songs. This led to a revolt against the strict Catholic rules against Indigenous culture. He also violated the Durieu plan by preaching in the Shuswap language at the Mission in 1877; the Indigenous people mocked his inability to properly speak their language[source?]. Despite Father Marchal's troubles, he was not aided or replaced, as all other available priests were either needed to run the school, or were not interested in visiting Indigenous settlements. The Tsilhqot'in were particularly neglected, as there were no priests able to speak in the Chilcotin language.

By 1877 nearly every farmable tract of land in the Cariboo had been preempted by white settlers, leaving nothing for the Indigenous people, leading to considerable unrest. By 1879, Chief William, whose band by this point was living on the Mission, published the following letter in the Daily British Colonist: "I am an Indian Chief and my people are threatened by starvation. The white men have taken all the land and all the fish. A vast country was ours. It is all gone. The noise of the threshing machine and the wagon has frightened the deer and the beaver. We have nothing to eat. My people are sick." Yet Chief William saw that the only result of war with the white people would be the destruction of his people, and counselled his people against war. The initial reaction to Chief William's letter in Victoria was incredulity; however, Father McGuckin's corroboration of the letter led Ottawa to donate some flour and meat to Chief William's band. A particularly harsh winter in 1879 and further advocacy by Father McGuckin led the government to purchase a ranch near Williams Lake and offer it to Chief William's band. In 1880, Chief William was forced to move his people from the Mission to the Sugarcane reserve next to the St. Joseph's Mission. Most of the other bands were forced onto reserves in the Cariboo during the 1880s.

=== Residential school ===
Beginning as early as 1878, the Oblates of the St. Joseph's Mission began to apply pressure on the federal government to fund a school for the Indigenous children of the Cariboo. Mission founder Father McGuckin claimed that it was necessary for the Indigenous children to obtain a religious education in order to keep them from civilized temptations and keep them in the Catholic faith.

Meanwhile, in 1880, the Oblates opened a school in Kamloops, which led many of St. Joseph's students to transfer to the new school. Enrollment decreased gradually and by 1888 there were fewer than 30 students at the two schools. Therefore, both the girls’ and boys’ schools ceased operations in 1888.

In 1890, Bishop Paul Durieu petitioned the government to open a government-funded Indian residential school on the property of St. Joseph's Mission. Durieu recommended a school with a significant focus on agriculture in order to help the Indigenous transition from traditional hunter-gatherers to European-style farmers. Earlier, Durieu had convinced the federal government to fund Indian residential schools at Cranbrook in 1889 and Kamloops in 1890. Following Durieu's petitions, the Department of Indian Affairs sent an agent to investigate the Mission property, and upon finding it suitable, offered to purchase part of the mission for use by the government. Durieu refused and instead offered to run the residential school on a contract basis, $130 per Indigenous child per year, to a maximum of 50 students. The government accepted the Oblates' offer, and the school opened in 1891. The school became one of the first schools in the Canadian Indian residential school system, taking the name St. Joseph's Indian Residential School.

=== Early days ===
The local bands were hesitant to send their children to the school at first. They had petitioned the mission to open a school, but had wanted to supplement their traditional education, not to completely eliminate their traditional education altogether. In 1895 the government made attendance compulsory between the ages of 7 and 16. As there were no day schools, St. Joseph's Mission became their only choice, and for most Cariboo Indigenous students, it would remain their only choice until 1967.

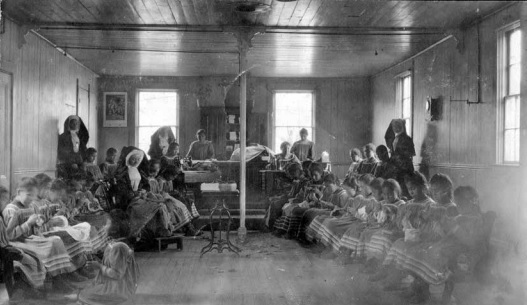
Girls sewing at St. Joseph's Mission; their products were usually sold to raise money for the school.

The school was initially set up to teach trades to its students. The Oblates promised the federal government to teach "two or three trades" to its students, which for boys meant carpentry, blacksmithing, and some agricultural skills, and for the girls, housekeeping, buttermaking, sewing, and knitting. However in 1891, the school's blacksmith shop burned down. After the reconstruction of the blacksmith's shop, the school's blacksmith became sick and quit. In September 1892, the Oblates hired a talented blacksmith to teach trades at St. Joseph's. At the end of the school year, he asked for a pay raise, was denied, and quit. They replaced him with a Mr. Horan, who worked for the school for three years before he was fired for participating in a political campaign. When the school was unable to find a replacement, they re-hired Mr. Horan, but he took an unauthorized leave of absence for three months, got into debt, and developed a reputation for public drunkenness, which affected the reputation of the school.

The first mission for the schools's teachers was to teach the students English. At first, none of the students knew any English, so the school had to temporarily permit the use of Indigenous languages. By 1894, the boys were mostly speaking English, with principal J.M.J. Lejacq declaring that "the Indian language is a thing of the past." The girls took longer to give up their Indigenous languages: they were still speaking them regularly in 1896. Later on, the students would be punished for speaking their indigenous languages, and the school successfully caused the children to lose the ability to speak their native tongue.

The Sisters of Saint Anne left in 1896 due to financial difficulties. They were replaced by the Order of the Sisters of the Child Jesus, who came from France to serve at St. Joseph's Mission. At first neither the girls they were teaching (who had less time at the Mission school than the boys) nor the nuns who were teaching them spoke any English, the mandated language of instruction for the school. In 1897, St. Joseph's also opened a novitiate that the Sisters of the Child Jesus operated, although no Indigenous girls graduated from the program.

=== Early complaints ===
Initially, the government agreed to support a maximum of 50 indigenous students at the St. Joseph's School, but in 1893, the government cut the pupilage to 25. When the school refused to send students home, the school became heavily indebted, which threatened the school's existence. The government's cheques also began to arrive late, further complicating the matter; and both school buildings were in poor condition and in need of replacement. The mission temporarily closed the girls' school and negotiated with the government over the situation. The government agreed to provide funding for 35 students and $2,000 to build a new boys' school. However, when the cheque arrived, the Mission found that they had only been given $756. Bishop Durieu responded by threatening to close the girls' school permanently.

To raise funds, the school sold agricultural and manufactured goods created by its students. This led Mr. Davison, a Kamloops harness maker, to write a letter of complaint to his local member of Parliament, Mr. Barnard, about the school. He said that it was impossible for an honest businessman to compete with prison labour, and questioned whether the school's purpose was to educate students or earn money. The Department of Indian Affairs investigated, and was told that the government did not provide sufficient funding, and a funding increase would be needed for this to stop. The Department of Indian Affairs opted instead to allow the school to continue its money-making ventures.

Further complaints came in 1899, this time via an anonymous letter written to the Superintendent General of the Department of Indian Affairs. This complaint echoed the earlier complaint, which stated that the students were being used as cheap labourers to support a profitable business that then cut into the business of other local merchants, but added further claims, such as admitting white children and claiming them as Indians for funding purposes, and that the children were poorly cared for. This led the department of Indian Affairs to make a surprise visit to the school, where the school was given high marks for the quality of education it offered to its students. White children were found to attend, because St. Joseph's Mission was the only local school, but none of the white children stayed overnight. Another complaint came in 1900, when E.A. Carew-Gibson of the Cariboo Trading Company complained that the school was selling grain and hay below market value. The department forwarded the complaint to the school, but did not investigate further.

Initially, both religious workers and non-religious workers were involved in students' academic education, but by 1902, the Sisters of the Child Jesus took over all academic instruction for both boys and girls, while the Oblates took over trade education. The Oblate priests lived in the same building that the boys lived in, while the Sisters lived in the girls building.

Students at first did not get any vacation days during the school year. Parents protested to the local Indian agent, asking for a month off during the summer during which they could spend time with their children, a request that the Indian Agent found reasonable. However, in negotiations between the federal government and school principal Father Lejacq, the federal government refused to pay the school for days when students were home on vacation, and the school refused to accept any reduction in its funding; so the students were denied vacation time.

=== Evangelism on the reserves ===
The priests of the Mission relied on grand church-opening ceremonies to replace Indigenous rituals such as the potlatch, which they had now banned. Bishop Pierre-Paul Durieu founded the Indian Total Abstinence Society of British Columbia in 1895 at Saint Joseph's Mission to encourage prohibition on all reserves. Band chiefs under the Durieu system were encouraged to publicly whip people in order to encourage members to follow church rules, a practice which was tacitly endorsed by the government. However, a court case in which a priest and chief were found guilty of assault after administering thirty lashes to a 17-year old Indigenous girl for promiscuity led Bishop Durieu to found the Total Abstinence Society instead. (The government overturned the sentence after an appeal by the church.) The Society would become responsible for holding new converts to their pledge to give up alcohol, and to punish people who fell short.

In 1899, Father Thomas began a new evangelistic effort among the Tsilhqot'in, by instituting the Durieu system at Anaham. Without converting them, Father Thomas appointed some chiefs to serve as the church's representatives to ensure good behaviour among the Tsilhqot'in, a task they were willing to do. Father Thomas waited 13 years before first administering communion to "worthy" Tsilqot'in at Anaham, and in time his efforts at converting the Tsilhqot'in were successful. The Mission assisted by pre-empting land that white settlers wanted and handing it over to the Tsilhqot'in; and they often petitioned the government to increase the size of reserve land. By 1923, the people of Anaham sold 60 horses in order to raise funds to build a church on their reserve.

== Student deaths ==
=== Duncan Sticks ===
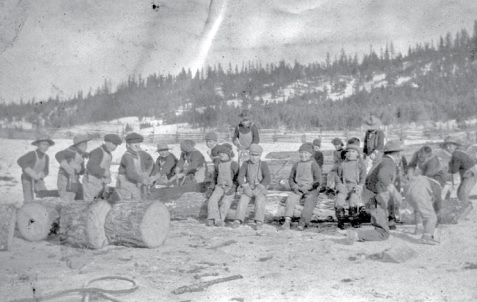
Boys from the St. Joseph's Mission chopping wood.

Duncan Sticks was born in 1893 to a family from Alkali Lake. He was taken to the residential school at a young age. When he was seven years old, he ran away from the residential school for the first time, and successfully made it back to Alkali Lake. He was sick when he arrived, and his family nursed him back to health before his father returned him to school.

On February 8, 1902, nine boys ran away from the school after lunch. Two of the boys were from Alkali Lake, three from Williams Lake, and four from Canim Lake. Each group headed towards its respective home. The supervising teacher pursued the Williams Lake and Alkali Lake boys, while the principal pursued the Canim Lake boys. When the principal returned to the school at 5:00pm, he was informed that Alkali Lake boy Duncan Sticks was still missing and declined to continue the search. The following day, he sent a staff member to the Indian reserve to find him. Later that day, a local rancher named Anthony Boitano searched for and found Duncan Sticks' body, frozen to death.

Indian Affairs conducted a quick investigation and blamed lax discipline by priests at the school. The Bishop of New Westminster wrote to Indian Affairs blaming the character of the Indigenous students: "Indians have a holy horror of anything which smacks of system and order."

At first, the local coroner refused to investigate Duncan Sticks' death, claiming the government did not see any reason for an enquiry. However, E.A. Carew-Gibson and a former teacher named Mr. Brophy lobbied the Attorney General of British Columbia for an enquiry, so an enquiry was held. Brophy had kept a record of student mistreatment at the school from the time he had worked there. However the Indian Affairs representative doubted the accuracy of his record, as he had recently been dismissed for drunkenness, and claimed that the mistreatment in the book was "slight indeed compared to the time I went to school."

Duncan Sticks' sister said in an interview during the coroner's investigation that the children were served rotten beef, and if they refused to eat it, they would be tied up and blindfolded and starved for a day. She also said that other students had been struck across the face with a strap and that she had run away from the school the previous fall and that no one had come after her. Many other students echoed the point about food, and additional complaints surfaced of being stripped naked and beaten then held in solitary confinement for as long as twelve days. The school sent a priest to the Alkali Lake reserve before the coroner arrived and instructed the people there to say nothing about the death to any white men. The principal also sent a desperate letter to the coroner and the jury offering to open up the school for a personal inspection. A number of staff at the Mission were pressured to change or recant their testimony to the jury.

The principal stated that students had run away from school regularly, saying the food quality was poor and that the boys were denied water after dinner to prevent them from wetting their beds. At the conclusion of the coroner's inquest, the jury made a recommendation for an independent inquiry into the school, but no independent inquiry took place. Indian Affairs was instead authorized to conduct its own investigation, in which they discounted all claims of misconduct made during the inquest, and dismissed Brophy as a troublemaker. Indian Affairs told the children it was their own fault for not asking for more food, and that it was wrong to resist discipline, and that the Indigenous people themselves were the problem. The following Christmas, the children wrote a letter to the Deputy Superintendent of Indian Affairs, apologizing for being bad, promising to become better.

At the Mission, Mr. Brophy's dismissal and the subsequent scandal led the Mission to view all laymen as untrustworthy teachers, and subsequently nearly all of the laymen working at the school were dismissed. The Oblate Brothers took over teaching trades, while the Sisters of the Child Jesus taught academic subjects to the boys in addition to their duties to the girls.

=== Augustine Allan ===
Children continued to run away from the school so frequently that in 1910 students were banned from working in the fields. The principal asked Indian Affairs for help with his runaway problem, and they conducted another investigation, which revealed that the quality of food was the reason for the runaways. The principal demanded that the students recant their testimony and complained that the mission was constantly a victim of "the most absurd accusations."

In 1920, a boy by the name of Augustine Allan of the Canim Lake Band died, and it was reported as an accidental death. Further investigation revealed that the boys of the school were depressed because of the harshness of the discipline, which led nine boys to agree to eat water hemlock in a suicide pact. Allan died, and the other eight boys became very sick. This led to multiple requests by parents to have their children discharged from the school, with the father of the dead boy assisting in this effort, who said that the school did "not send any notice" to say that his son had died.

As before the local coroner initially chose not to hold an inquest, saying "there was nothing suspicious about children eating a poison weed." The local Indian agent believed that the school would refuse to cooperate, so he wrote to Ottawa asking them to carry out a medical examination of the boys in the school. The department of Indian Affairs refused, and asked the agent to look into the "unduly severe punishment" at the school. In the time it had taken for the reply to return, the children had gone home on vacation, so the agent was unable to investigate further. The agent offered to interview students at their home reserves, but was denied permission. The agent claimed that while there was a "great tendency to lying upon the part of the Indians... on the other we have a decided lack of something upon the side of the Missions." He attacked the mission system and argued that Indian Affairs should operate the schools themselves, as day schools on the reserves. Instead, the inspector of Indian schools interviewed the former principal of the school, who claimed that on one occasion one of the brothers had become incensed at the behaviour of a student and beat him with a rod, causing the boy to run away. The inspector was satisfied and declared the matter closed.

=== Other deaths ===
Many other students died while attending the school at St. Joseph's Mission, but these students died with less recognition. The Tsilhqot'in were the most reluctant to send their children to St. Joseph's; by 1918, there were six or seven Tsilhqot'in in attendance at St. Joseph's. In 1925, two Tsilhqot'in children died of tuberculosis, causing the parents of the remaining Tsilhqot'in children to withdraw them from the school. It was not until the 1930s that the Tsilhqot'in attended St. Joseph's in large numbers.

== Fires and scandals ==
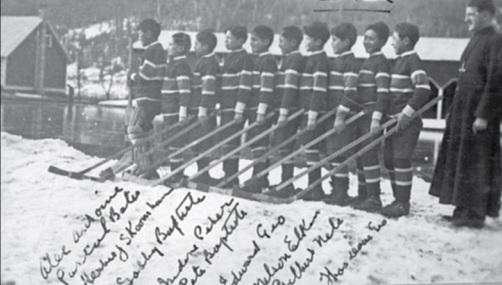
The hockey team of the St. Joseph's Mission Indian Residential School; an example of how students were made to participate in white Canadian cultural activities while giving up their Indigenous cultural activities.

In the 1940s, the Durieu system began to weaken on the reserves. As more of the Indigenous had been trained at St. Joseph's, the Durieu system was no longer necessary to maintain church influence on the reserves. Some of the younger priests were happy to see the end of the Durieu system.

In 1947, a novitiate was established at Anaham for Indigenous women who wanted to become nuns. The novitiate operated for just over a decade and graduated two nuns before closing.

Also in the 1940s, the Archbishop of Vancouver pushed for the creation of day schools on each reserve to replace St. Joseph's Mission. Day schools operated by the Missionary Sisters of Christ the King were opened in Anaham and Redstone, financed by the Canadian government. However, the Oblates managed to keep St. Joseph's the primary educator of Indigenous children in the Cariboo.

Children continued to run away from the school in the 1940s. In 1944, 23 boys ran away from school to attend the Alkali Lake Stampede, which resulted in the local Indian Agent demanding that a new principal be appointed. In 1946, Father Alex Morris was appointed the principal of St. Joseph's, and he created a rule forbidding priests and nuns from addressing each other in French in front of the Indigenous children. This ended a long-standing complaint from the children, that the nuns were allowed to speak to each other in their own language, but they were not allowed to speak to each other in their own Indigenous languages. He also switched St. Joseph's from a half-day school, half-day work program to a full-day school program consistent with the curriculum of the public schools of British Columbia. Father Morris also started St. Joseph's music program by hiring piano and organ teachers, starting an Air Force Cadet squadron, and founding a pipe and drum band. He persuaded the government of British Columbia to fund the purchase of bagpipes for the school so that they could also start a girls' pipe band. This move was later criticized as an act of forcing an alien culture onto the Indigenous children, but the principal was unapologetic: he saw that no music instruction was happening at St. Joseph's, and he insisted that music instruction of any kind available be started at the school. Father Morris' reforms were successful in stopping the children from running away from the school.

In 1946, following a government inspection, the government declared the St. Joseph's School building a fire hazard and a menace to the health of the students and staff. The government asked the Oblates to replace the building. Indeed, the buildings had been condemned as early as 1939. A sister who worked at the school wrote to the Prime Minister's wife in 1949, claiming that the buildings were "cold and dilapidated", with frequent blackouts, and of the convent she wrote that it could "go up in flames some fine night." The government responded that they were in the process of drawing up plans for a replacement building.

In 1954, a fire destroyed one classroom at the school. Then on December 22, 1955, the school became internationally known when the British United Press published a story titled "Indian Children 'Starved'". The reporter had interviewed parents saying that their children "are being half starved"; and that when the children had come home for Christmas, "they all had frozen hands, ears, faces and even feet. Some had to be taken to the hospital." In response to the story, the local Indian agent demanded an apology, claiming the reporter should have fact-checked the story with the school first. The news service followed by running a story from the school disputing the allegations.

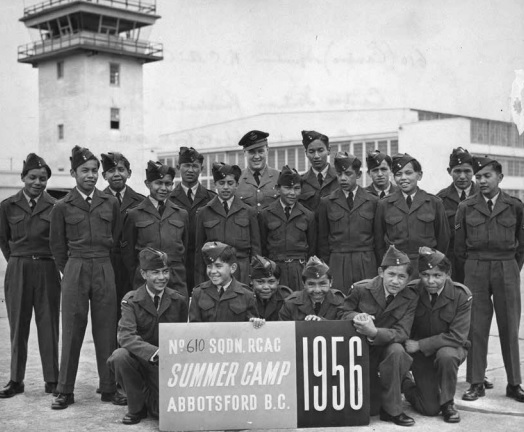
Air Cadets from the St. Joseph's Mission Indian Residential School; another example of replacing Indigenous cultural activities with white Canadian cultural activities.

The following week, an Oblate at the school wrote to his provincial superior, claiming that the school principal had a drinking problem and had lost control of the school. The Oblates sent an investigator, who found the accusations to be true, and furthermore found several other problems that should have been reported to the government. The local Indian Agent, also a Catholic, expressed concerns that this could become bad publicity for the church, even suggesting that a Protestant agent would have reported the principal to the government a long time ago. Thus, in January 1956, the provincial superior asked the principal to discuss the possibility of taking a leave of absence. The principal immediately abandoned his position and left the school. The local Indian Agent did not report any of the issues with the school to the government.

In 1957, the school burned down. The land was donated to the federal government, and the school was quickly rebuilt.

In the 1950s, the government and Indigenous leaders moved to have Indigenous education moved from residential schools to day schools located on reserves, operated by the government. By 1957, most reserves in the Cariboo had day schools. Despite this, St. Joseph's enrollment remained high.

In 1965, the Cariboo Union Board of Health declared the school a public nuisance, as the school was dumping 40,000 gallons of raw sewage into the San Jose River each day, the river which flowed from there into Williams Lake. The board threatened to close the school within two months if the school did not create a sewage treatment plant for the school. Following these threats, the government arranged for the construction of a new sewage lagoon that same year.

Also in 1965, a school inspection led to the fire protection of the school being described as "wholly inadequate". The building was made of combustible materials and had no sprinkler system, and the existing fire equipment was described as in "poor maintenance".

In 1967, the engineer's shack at the school was destroyed by a fire.

== Later years ==
In 1967, the government noted that the school was significantly above its maximum student capacity of 257, with an enrollment of 307. The principal of the school refused to reduce enrollment and instead told the government to provide money to expand the school.

In 1968, a University of British Columbia professor asked if they could conduct a medical test on the students at the school for a medical study, which involved taking the fingerprints of students. The school willingly participated, and while the study did not harm the students, the school did not obtain consent from the parents before subjecting the students to the study.

In 1968, a new gym was constructed at the school.

== School closure ==
On March 31, 1969, the federal government took over control of the school from the Catholic Church, along with all of the schools in the Canadian Indian residential school system. In 1981, St. Joseph's school was closed and turned into an adult education centre.

The remaining property of St. Joseph's Mission was sold by the Oblates and the funds from the sale were used to benefit other Oblate missions. In 1987, the old school building was torn down.

== Discovery of abuse ==
=== Sexual abuse trials ===
In 1959, Oblate priest Harold McIntee began to work at the school. While at the school, he would sneak into the boys dormitory at night and fondle the students. When the boys asked him to stop, he claimed that he was checking them for lice. He remained at the school until 1963, when he transferred to a different school. In 1988, the Royal Canadian Mounted Police investigated McIntee's actions, resulting in McIntee being charged and convicted of sexual assault in the cases of 17 boys over a period of 25 years, of which thirteen charges related to his work at the school. He was sentenced to two years in prison and three years of probation.

From 1961 to 1967, Father Hubert O'Connor served as principal of the school. In 1996, he was convicted of committing rape and indecent assault on two young aboriginal women during his time as principal. His rape of one of the Indigenous girls caused her to give birth to a child, for whom O'Connor arranged an adoption. During the trial, O'Connor claimed that the sexual relations were consensual. He was sentenced to two-and-a-half years in prison. After serving six months, he won a new trial, and the charges were later dropped in exchange for O'Connor attending a healing circle in Alkali Lake, British Columbia.

In 1964, Oblate priest Glenn Doughty began working at the school. In 1990, he was arrested and charged with five counts of indecent assault and five counts of gross indecency. He pled guilty to four charges that related to his conduct at St. Joseph's School in 1991. He was sentenced to one year in prison. In 2000, he was charged with 36 further offences from to his time at St. Joseph's and at Kuper Island Indian Residential School, and these resulted in another three years in prison.

In the late 1960s and early 1970s, Edward Gerald Fitzgerald worked as a dorm supervisor at the school. In 2003, he was charged with ten counts of indecent assault, three counts of gross indecency, two counts of buggery, and six counts of common assault, in relation to his time at the Fraser Lake school and the St. Joseph School. However, by that time, he lived in Ireland, which had no extradition treaty with Canada at the time. As a result, he did not stand trial for the charges.

Several other former school employees faced investigations in the 1980s and the 1990s, but the remainder of the charges were not pursued in court.

=== Other findings ===
At a 2022 press conference about the discovery of unmarked graves at the school, other stories of sexual abuse were shared. Former students shared that if a student's name was being called over the intercom, they knew that student was about to be sexually assaulted. Students also knew that pregnancies resulting from the sexual abuse were covered up. Some survivors reported that unwanted babies were burned in the incinerator at St. Joseph's. Other children's bodies were tossed into rivers and the bottom of lakes.

== Life at the school ==
The priests and nuns who taught at the school had been trained primarily in Europe, and were used to a strict model of education. They expected students to obey immediately, behave orderly, and to always pay attention; and if students failed on any of these points, they were to be punished. This system of education clashed with the culture of the children they were serving. Many of the students responded by attempting to run away from school.

Students were separated by sex and were not allowed to see students of the other sex except at chapel, where they would be seated on opposite sides of the room. Use of Indigenous languages was restricted, something that was common to all schools in the Canadian Indian residential school system.

== Legacy ==
=== SJM Project ===
In May 2013, survivors of the St. Joseph's school gathered together for reunion and reconciliation, and founded the SJM Project. The SJM Project erected a monument at the cemetery of the former school site, and a second monument in Boitanio Park in Williams Lake.

=== Orange Shirt Day ===
During this reunion, survivor Phyllis Webstad told the story about her first day in residential school in 1973, when the new orange shirt that her grandmother had bought her was taken away from her and never returned. The SJM Project arranged for schools in the Williams Lake area to wear orange shirts on September 30, in memory of the residential school victims.

The observance of Orange Shirt Day quickly spread across Canada, and in 2021 it became a national statutory holiday, officially titled the "National Day for Truth and Reconciliation."

=== Cemetery ===
When the mission first opened, it contained the only cemetery in the area until Williams Lake was granted official town status in 1920 and began its own cemetery. Today, the grounds of the cemetery and the foundations of the former school building are mostly untended, and are marked as a historic site of the province of British Columbia.

The Williams Lake First Nation began a search of the former residential school site, using ground-penetrating radar to look for unmarked graves. On January 25, 2022, the Williams Lake First Nation announced that their search had discovered 93 "reflections" consistent with graves on the grounds of St. Joseph's Mission. The preliminary search covered 14 hectares of the 480-hectare mission property, as well as other points of interest discovered through historical research.

=== Literature ===
In 1981, Margaret Whitehead wrote "The Cariboo Mission: a history of the Oblates" about the history of St. Joseph's Mission. In 2013, Chief Bev Sellars wrote "They Called Me Number One" about her experience attending the St. Joseph's Residential School, which won the George Ryga Award for Social Awareness in Literature. In 2018, Phyllis Webstad published her orange shirt story as a picture book for children, "The Orange Shirt Story"; and in 2019, she created another version of the book for younger children called "Phyllis's Orange Shirt".

== See also ==
- Canadian Indian residential school system
- List of Indian residential schools in Canada
- Sugarcane (film)
