= Eskʼetemc First Nation =

First Nation government in British Columbia, Canada

Eskʼetemc First Nation, also known as the Alkali Lake Indian Band, is a First Nations government of the Secwepemc (Shuswap) people, located at Alkali Lake in the Cariboo region of the Central Interior of the Canadian province of British Columbia. It is one of three Secwepemc bands that is not a member of either the Shuswap Nation Tribal Council or the Northern Shuswap Tribal Council. In the Shuswap language, the people of Alkali Lake are the Eskʼetemc ("people of Eskʼet").

== Reserves ==
The reserves of the Esk'etemc were created when the government of the then-Colony of British Columbia established an Indian reserve system in the 1860s. Esk'etemc First Nation has not signed any treaty with any settler-colonial political entity, nor has it ceded any land and let go of its territorial claims.

The reserves under the administration of Esk'etemc First Nation are:

- Alixton Indian Reserve No. 5, at west end of Alixton Lake, 5 miles E of Alkali Lake PO, 91.90 ha. 51°48′00″N 122°08′00″W
- Alkali Lake Indian Reserve No. 1, at Alkali Lake PO, 241.40 ha. 51°47′00″N 122°14′00″W
- Alkali Lake Indian Reserve No. 4A, 5 miles NE of Alkali Lake PO, 130.50 ha. 51°49′00″N 122°07′00″W
- Cludolicum Indian Reserve No. 9, 9 miles NE of Alkali Lake PO, 566.60 ha. 51°52′00″N 122°02′00″W
- Cludolicum Indian Reserve No. 9A, 10 miles NE of Alkali Lake PO, E of and adjoining IR No. 9, 101.10 ha. 51°52′00″N 122°01′00″W
- Isadore Harry Indian Reserve No. 12, on middle fork of Alkali Creek 8 miles E of Alkali Lake PO. 121.40 ha. 51°48′00″N 122°04′00″W
- Johnny Sticks Indian Reserve No. 2, on Kirkpatrick Creek 5 miels NE of Alkali Lake PO, 323.80 ha. 51°50′00″N 122°10′00″W
- Little Springs Indian Reserve No. 18, 8 miles NE of Alkali Lake PO, W of and adjoining IR No. 8, 284.50 ha. 51°52′00″N 122°05′00″W
- Little Springs Indian Reserve No. 8, on Kirkpatrick Creek 7 miles NE of Alkali Lake PO, 194.20 ha. 51°51′00″N 122°05′00″W
- Loon Lake Indian Reserve No. 10, 6 miles S of east end of Felker Lake, 121.40 ha. 51°52′00″N 121°58′00″W
- Old Clemenes Indian Reserve No. 16, on right (W) bank of the Fraser River, opposite mouth of Alkali Creek, 16.0 ha. 51°43′00″N 122°21′00″W
- Pete Suckers Indian Reserve No. 13, 7 miles E of Alkali Lake PO, 566.0 ha. 51°47′00″N 122°04′00″W
- Roper's Meadow Indian Reserve No. 14, on a small creek 4 miles eastwards from Alkali Lake PO, 32.40 ha. 51°47′00″N 122°09′00″W
- Sampson's Meadow Indian Reserve No. 11, on middle fork of Alkali Creek, 9 miles E of Alkali Creek PO, 324.0 ha. 51°48′00″N 122°01′00″W
- Sampson's Meadow Indian Reserve No. 11A, east of and adjoining IR No. 11, 53.0 ha. 51°48′00″N 122°00′00″W
- Sandy Harry Indian Reserve No. 4, on middle fork of Alkali Creek 6 miles NE of Alkali Lake PO, 218.50 ha. 51°49′00″N 122°06′00″W
- Swan Lake Indian Reserve No. 3, on Kirkpatrick Creek, 8 miles NE of Alkali Lake PO, 72.80 ha. 51°51′00″N 122°07′00″W
- Windy Mouth Indian Reserve No. 7, on north shore of Lac La Hache, 2.80 ha. 51°51′00″N 121°35′00″W
- Wycott's Flat Indian Reserve No. 6, on left (E) bank of the Fraser River, N of the mouth of Dog Creek, 497.80 ha. 51°37′00″N 122°19′00″W

== See also ==
- Williams Lake, British Columbia
- Alkali lake
