= Williams Lake First Nation =

- Band No. 719
- Tʼexelcemc
- People: Secwépemc
- Headquarters: Williams Lake
- Province: British Columbia

Land
- Main reserve: Williams Lake 1
- Reserves: List: Asahal Lake 2; Five Mile 3; James Louie 3a; Tillion 4; Chimney Creek 5; San Jose 6; Carpenter Mountain 15
- Land area: 19.8 km^{2} (7.6 sq mi)

Population (2024)
- On reserve: 252
- On other land: 49
- Off reserve: 752
- Total population: 1053

Government
- Chief: Willie Sellars

Tribal Council
- Northern Shuswap Tribal Council

Website
- www.wlfn.ca

The Williams Lake First Nation (Shuswap language: Tʼexelcemc) is a First Nations government of the Secwépemc Nation, located in the Cariboo region of the Central Interior region of the Canadian province of British Columbia, at the city of Williams Lake. It was created when the government of the then-Colony of British Columbia established an Indian reserve system in the 1860s. It is a member government of the Northern Shuswap Tribal Council. Its main Indian Reserve is Williams Lake Indian Reserve No. 1, a.k.a. "Sugarcane" or "The Cane" or "SCB".

The Williams Lake First Nation has not signed any treaty with any settler-colonial political entity, nor has it ceded any land and let go its territorial claims. As part of the Northern Secwepemc te Qelmucw (Tribal Council), Williams Lake First Nation has been in negotiation with the government of Canada and the government of British Columbia regarding a final treaty settling this matter. An "Agreement in Principle" was signed in 2018. Once a final agreement is signed between the Tribal Council, Canada, and British Columbia, it is expected that the Indian Reserves will be abolished, the territories under jurisdiction of Williams Lake First Nation will expand significantly, and former reserves will be absorbed into settlement land under sovereignty of Williams Lake First Nation.

== Indian Reserves ==
The Williams Lake Band has eight reserve landsites in British Columbia. The total area of Williams Lake First Nation reserve land is 1,927 ha. Indian Reserve lands of the Williams Lake Band are:

- Asahal Lake Indian Reserve No. 2, at the head of Asahal Creek, 3 miles north of the east end of Williams Lake, 48.60 ha. 52°09′00″N 122°01′00″W
- Carpenter Mountain Indian Reserve No. 15, on the Old Cariboo Road, near the 156 Mile Post west of Cariboo Hill Lake, 68.30 ha. 52°11′00″N 121°58′00″W
- Chimney Creek Indian Reserve No. 5, on the left bank of the Fraser River at the mouth of Chimney Creek, 22.70 ha. 52°04′00″N 122°17′00″W
- Five Mile Indian Reserve No. 3, on Five Mile Creek 3.5 miles north of the mouth of the San Jose River, four miles north of 150 Mile House. 73.00 ha. 52°10′00″N 121°58′00″W
- James Louie Indian Reserve No. 3A, on Five Mile Creek, 4 miles north of 150 Mile House east of an adjoining Five Mile IR No. 3, 64.00 ha. 52°10′00″N 121°57′00″W
- San Jose Indian Reserve No. 6, on the west end of Williams Lake (the lake), north of its outlet, 2.60 ha. 52°08′00″N 122°07′00″W
- Tillion Indian Reserve No. 4, on the left bank of the Fraser River, at the mouth of the Williams Lake River, 2.40 ha. 52°10′00″N 122°17′00″W
- Williams Lake Indian Reserve No. 1, on the right bank of the San Jose River at the east end of Williams Lake (the lake), 12 km (~7 miles) southeast of the city of Williams Lake, 1645.30 ha. This reserve is commonly referred to as the Sugarcane Reserve, or simply "Sugarcane". 52°07′00″N 122°00′00″W

These reserves were unilaterally defined by the Government of British Columbia, and thus the Band has never retracted its claim on its territory. These reserves are expected to be abolished and absorbed into settlement lands, after the signing of a final agreement.
