= Adams Lake Indian Band =

First Nation in British Colombia

Adams Lake
- Band No. 684
- People: Secwépemc
- Headquarters: Chase
- Province: British Columbia

Land
- Main reserve: Sahhaltkum 4
- Reserves: List: Hustalen 1; Squaam 2; Toops 3; Stequmwhulpa 5; Switsemalph 6; Switsemalph 7
- Land area: 29.09 km^{2} (11.23 sq mi)

Population (2025)
- On reserve: 362
- On other land: 69
- Off reserve: 437
- Total population: 868

Government
- Chief: Lynn Kenoras

Tribal Council
- Shuswap Nation Tribal Council

Website
- adamslakeband.org

Adams Lake Indian Band (Shuswap language: Sexqeltqin) is a member of the Secwepemc (Shuswap) Nation. It was created when the government of the Colony of British Columbia established an Indian reserve system in the 1860s. Adams Lake Indian Band is a member band of the Shuswap Nation Tribal Council, which represents Secwepemc people in the Thompson and Shuswap districts of southern Central Interior region. Four Secwepemc governments farther north in the Cariboo belong to the Northern Shuswap Tribal Council. Chief Atahm School houses an immersion program important to keeping the Secwepemc language alive, and is located on an Adams Lake Indian Band Reserve.

== Reserves ==
Adam's Lake Band (Sexqeltqin) has jurisdiction over the following reserves:

- Hustalen 1
- Squaam 2
- Toops 3
- Sahhaltkum 4
- Stequmwhulpa 5
- Switsemalph 6
- Switsemalph 7

== See also ==
- Shuswap Nation Tribal Council
- Northern Shuswap Tribal Council
