= Llenlleney'ten =

Secwepemc First Nations of British Columbia

The Llenlleney'ten, sometimes also known as the High Bar First Nation, are a First Nations people in the Chilcotin District-Fraser Canyon region of the Canadian province of British Columbia. They are a subgroup of the Secwepemc people and reside on a remote stretch of the Fraser River about 50 kilometres north of Lillooet at a location known as High Bar, and also at adjacent Low Bar. Together with the Esketemc of the Alkali Lake Indian Band they are sometimes called the Canyon Shuswap, and historically have close ties to their Tsilhqot'in neighbours. The Llenlleney'ten are mostly Secwepemc ethnically, but have close family ties and shared cultural traditions with the Tsilhqot'in.

Their band government is called the High Bar First Nation.
