= Williams Lake Indian Reserve No. 1 =

First Nation reserve in British Columbia, Canada

Coordinates: 52°07′00″N 122°00′00″W

Williams Lake Indian Reserve, also called the Williams Lake First Nation or the Williams Lake Band Reservation and commonly referred to locally as the Sugarcane Reserve, aka Sugarcane or The Cane or SCB, is an Indian reserve in British Columbia, Canada, located at the east end of Williams Lake and 12 km (~7 miles) east of the city of the same name on the right bank of the San Jose River, and is home to the Williams Lake First Nation. The band is part of the Northern Shuswap Tribal Council, also known as the Cariboo Tribal Council, which is one of two tribal councils of the Secwepemc peoples.

The Williams Lake Band has eight reserve landsites in British Columbia. The total area of Williams Lake Indian Band reserve land is 1,927.3, with the Williams Lake Reserve the largest at 1645.30 ha. The other reserve lands of the Williams Lake Band are:

- Asahal Lake Indian Reserve No. 2, at the head of Azahal Creek, 3 miles north of the east end of Williams Lake, 48.60 ha.
- Carpenter Mountain Indian Reserve No. 15, on the Old Cariboo Road, near the 156 Mile Post west of Cariboo Hill Lake, 68.30 ha.
- Chimney Creek Indian Reserve No. 5, on the left bank of the Fraser River at the mouth of Chimney Creek, 22.70 ha.
- Five Mile Indian Reserve No. 3, on Five Mile Creek 3.5 miles north of the mouth of the San Jose River, four miles north of 150 Mile House. 73.00 ha.
- James Louie Indian Reserve No. 3A, on Five Mile Creek, 4 miles north of 150 Mile House east of an adjoining Five Mile IR No. 3, 64.00 ha.
- San Jose Indian Reserve No. 6, on the west end of Williams Lake (the lake), north of its outlet, 2.60 ha.
- Tillion Indian Reserve No. 4, on the left bank of the Fraser River, at the mouth of Williams Lake River, 2.40 ha.

A documentary called Sugarcane, which focused on residential school abuse in Canada and featured Williams Lake, was nominated for the Academy Award for Best Documentary Feature in 2025.
