= Mary Augusta Tappage =

First Nations storyteller (1888–1978)

- Born: 1888; Soda Creek
- Died: 1978 (aged 89–90)
- Known for: Shuswap-Métis elder, midwife, and storyteller
- Notable work: The Days of Augusta

Mary Augusta Tappage Evans (1888–1978) was a Shuswap-Métis elder, midwife, and storyteller. As a child, she was separated from her family and sent to the Indian boarding school at Saint Joseph's Mission. A member of the Soda Creek/Deep Creek Band, she married at the age of 15 and had four children. She was a self-taught midwife. Stories from her life were recorded and published in 1971 in the book The Days of Augusta.

== Early life and boarding school ==
Mary Augusta Tappage was born in 1888 in Soda Creek, in the Cariboo region. Her parents were Mary Ann Longshem, a Secwépemc (Shuswap) woman, and Christopher (Alex) Tappage, a Métis man. Her maternal grandfather, William Longshem, was a hereditary chief of the Secwépemc. Her paternal grandfather was Red River Métis and had resettled from the Red River Valley following the North-West Rebellion. She was part of the Soda Creek/Deep Creek Band (now known as the Xat'sull First Nation).

At the age of four, she was separated from her family and sent to the Roman Catholic boarding school at Saint Joseph's Mission. She was punished for speaking Shuswap, in which she was fluent. She learned English at the school. She stayed there until she was thirteen years old, after which she lived with her grandmother.

== Family and midwifery ==
In 1903, at the age of 15, Tappage married George Evans, who was half Welsh and half Secwépemc. According to the Canadian government's Indian Act, as a woman she lost her native status and membership in her band after marrying a "non-Indian". They had a small farm. While her husband was on a three-day drinking binge, she delivered her first child on her own. She then decided to learn midwifery. She ordered a book for doctors from an Eaton's catalogue, committed it to memory, and offered her services as a midwife for free. She and Evans had four children, including two girls who died in infancy. Due to their "non-native" status, her two boys were not allowed to attend the Indian residential school, so she taught them herself. Her husband died young and she never remarried, saying "once is enough". She also fostered several children and lived through the Spanish flu pandemic, which claimed the life of her grandmother.

Evans lived in a log cabin that had no electricity or running water and made all of her family's clothing as well as baskets and gillnets for fishing. She cleaned, cooked, and was a nanny in Soda Creek homes.

== The Days of Augusta ==
Tappage's stories were recorded by Jean E. Speare, a non-Indigenous woman she met in the late 1960s at a Native crafts booth in Williams Lake. At Speare's urging, Tappage narrated several stories from her life during weekly meetings at her home in Soda Creek. Her stories were transcribed and edited by Speare, and published in the 1971 book The Days of Augusta. Speare recorded Tappage speaking about her life during the time of western settlement, including stories about midwifery, mending fishing nets, smallpox, the Cree practice of stealing Shuswap women, and the impact of alcohol to First Nations people. The book's black and white photographs of Tappage were taken by Robert Keziere.

In her examination of mid-20th-century First Nations literature, Stephanie McKenzie writes that Speare's transcriptions of the stories, especially in her account of a gold rush stage heist "The Holdup" captured Tappage's use of repetition in her phrasing, a quality that was "suggestive of an older and more refined artform". In her review of The Days of Augusta, Linda Warley called it a foundational text of the Shuswap literary tradition. Warley generally praises the work, suggesting further research into Tappage's life, and offers a critique of Speare's level of transparency about her editing process and role as a non-Native editor of a Native narrative. One of the stories from The Days of Augusta, "The Big Tree and the Little Tree", was published by Speare as a children's illustrated book in 1986. The Days of Augusta arranges several of Tappage's stories in a poetical format, though it is unclear if she would have referred to herself as a poet. One of her poems was included in An Anthology of Canadian Native Literature in English.

A short documentary film of Tappage's life, Augusta, was directed by Ann Wheeler and produced by the National Film Board of Canada in 1976.

Tappage lived to see the publication of The Days of Augusta. She died in her cabin at the age of 90 on 16 August 1978. She was buried in the native cemetery of the Soda Creek Indian Reserve. An exhibition featuring Keziere's photographs and audio of Tappage speaking was held at the Penticton Art Gallery in 2014. The exhibition later toured other communities.
