= High Bar First Nation =

First Nation government in British Columbia, Canada

The High Bar First Nation is a First Nations government of the Secwepemc (Shuswap) Nation, located in the Fraser Canyon-Cariboo region of the Central Interior of the Canadian province of British Columbia. It was created when the government of the then-Colony of British Columbia established an Indian reserve system in the 1860s. It is one of three Secwepemc bands that is not a member of either the Shuswap Nation Tribal Council or the Northern Shuswap Tribal Council. The High Bar people are also partly Tsilhqot'in and have links with some Chilcotin First Nations.

In the Chilcotin language, the High Bar people are the Llenlleney'ten. The Secwepemc in the Fraser Canyon and on the Chilcotin Plateau are also known as the Canyon Shuswap and have traditionally had close ties with the Tsilhqot'in people.

== Indian reserves ==
There are three Indian reserves under the administration of the High Bar First Nation:

- High Bar Indian Reserve No. 1, on the Fraser River, 11 miles NW of Kelly Lake, 1183.30 ha. 51°06′00″N 122°00′00″W
- High Bar Indian Reserve No. 1A, south of and adjoining IR No. 1, 87.80 ha. 51°06′00″N 122°00′00″W
- High Bar Indian Reserve No. 2, on right (W) bank of the Fraser River, 10 miles NW of Kelly Lake, 275.20 ha. 51°05′00″N 121°58′00″W

== See also ==
- Williams Lake, British Columbia
- Lillooet, British Columbia
