= Neskonlith Indian Band =

Neskonlith
- Band No. 690
- People: Secwépemc
- Headquarters: Chase
- Province: British Columbia

Land
- Other reserves: Neskonlith 1; Neskonlith 2; Switsemalph 3
- Land area: 28.112 km^{2} (10.854 sq mi)

Population (2025)
- On reserve: 265
- On other land: 54
- Off reserve: 379
- Total population: 698

Government
- Chief: Irvine Wai
- Council: Shirley Anderson; Michael B. Arnouse; Mindy Dick; Joan Hooper; Frances Narcisse

Tribal Council
- Shuswap Nation Tribal Council

Website
- neskonlith.net

The Neskonlith Indian Band (sometimes Neskainlith) is a First Nations government in the Canadian province of British Columbia located in the Shuswap district east of Kamloops. It is a member of the Shuswap Nation Tribal Council, one of two main governmental bodies of the Secwepemc (Shuswap) people. It was created when the government of the Colony of British Columbia established an Indian reserve system without the consent and without consultation with the indigenous population of the colony, in the 1860s. The Neskonlith Indian Band is named after Chief Neskonlith, and co-established by Chief Careguire, Chief Neskonlith's father. The original reserve created is what is known as the Neskonlith Douglas Reserve.

The Neskonlith Indian Band is divided into three reserves, two near Chase, British Columbia, and one near Salmon Arm, British Columbia. The band currently has around 600 members.

== Reserves ==
Neskonlith Indian Band has jurisdiction over the three following reserves:

- Neskonlith 1 (Neskainlith 1)
- Neskonlith 2 (Neskainlith 2)
- Switsemalph 3

== See also ==
- Shuswap Nation Tribal Council
- Northern Shuswap Tribal Council
- George Manuel
- Squilax, British Columbia
