= Texqa'kallt =

First Nation in British Columbia

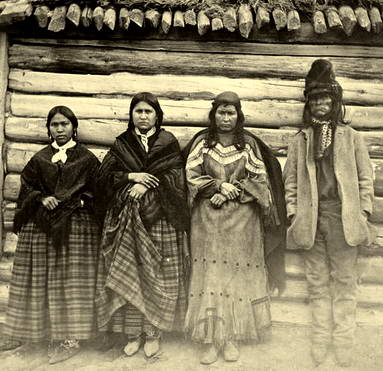
- Shuswap family

Regions with significant populations
- North Thompson (Canada)

Languages
- Shuswap, Cree

Related ethnic groups
- Secwépemc, Sekani

The Texqa'kallt or Xexka'llt (Shuswap: [tɛxqaʔkaɬt] "people of the upper reaches") are a division of the Shuswap people of British Columbia that are historically cited as living in and around the North Thompson, through to the Robson Valley. Historic accounts record them as being a mixed peoples speaking Cree and Shuswap, and ethnically of Iroquois, Cree and Shuswap origin. They are known for their participation in the Shuswap-Sekani War, a series of scattered skirmishes and conflicts in and around southern-central British Columbia during the 1780s.

== History, culture and language ==
The Texqa'kallt people were known for being advanced yet nomadic and are known to have ample access to iron well before 1793. They are also known to have usen horses after European contact, like most peoples in the area (but not all). They were mostly a fishing and gathering society, and even with European contact remained nomadic.

Between 1780 and 1790, the Shuswap-Sekani War was fought. Their main involvement in the war began around 1781 or 1782, when, while fishing at Peskala'llen (literally Salmon Place, a well-known spot for Texqa'kallt fishing), a large party of Sekani peoples attacked and killed most, while taking a few women for slavery. In response, the Texqa'kallt requested aid from the people living around modern Kamloops and the Fraser River, who were both known for being warlike. Many warriors responded, and soon they had swarmed a Sekani camp at night and killed all but one man. Battles continued, and by 1790 the war culminated in a final attack from the Shuswap which crippled the Sekani to the point of surrender. The Texqa'kallt likely took many slaves from the living Sekani, as shown by the presence of enslaved Sekani men & women during the expeditions of Sir Alexander Mackenzie in 1793.

They knew the waters of the Fraser River very well and the Upper Thompson bands would often fish in the river. Like other Interior Salish peoples, they survived mainly on seafood and would often trade it with other tribes, like the Cree.

Texqa'kallt people, along with all of the other Shuswap peoples, spoke their own regional variety of the Shuswap language. Shuswap is a Interior Salishan language and although certain forms of the language have been recorded, there is little known about the variant spoken by the Texqa'kallt. Place names are the furthest extent of known language.

== Modern day presence ==
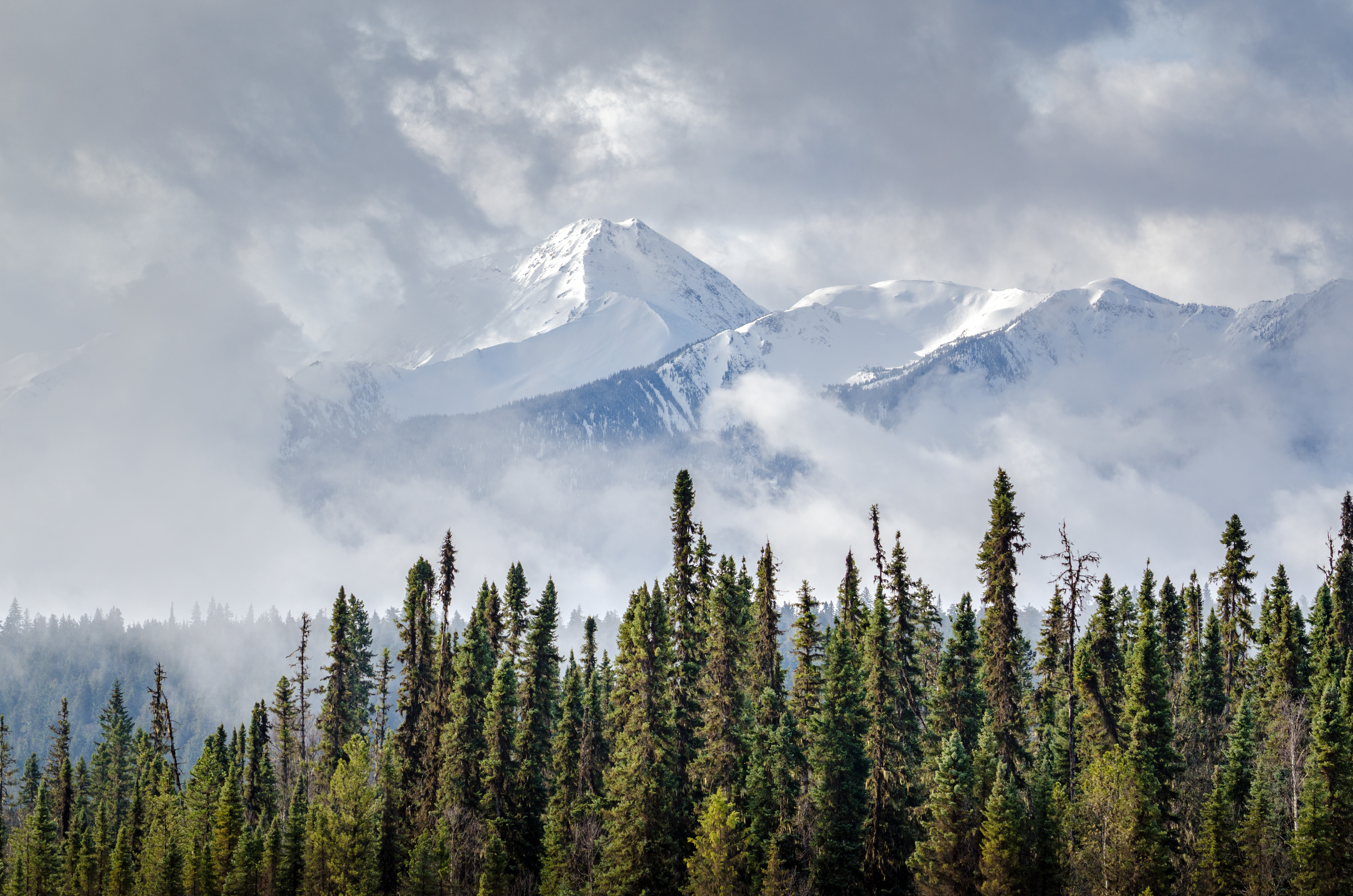
A view in the Robson Valley, the traditional territory of the Texqa'kallt and Simpcw

Little information, aside from the sparse accounts of English explorers in the area, is known about the change from Texqa'kallt to Simpcw. They were known to exist after the end of the Shuswap-Sekani war, but due to a yearlong smallpox outbreak in 1862, and the increasing intensity of Iroquois and Cree presence due to the fur trade, as of 1909, they had left most of the land. Tait cited them as being "numerous at one time, but had, it seems, no main village ... they were very nomadic". He continues to say, "A large part of the old hunting grounds in Caribou and north of the head of Fraser River are hardly ever used now, owing to the decrease in numbers of the tribe and to the change in manner of living", showing that by the 1910s they had a significantly changed and reduced population.

Today, their modern descendants are known as the Simpcw and still mostly inhabit the same area, practicing the same fishing and hunting traditions. The Simpcw are classified as a branch of Shuswap peoples that are also descended from the Texqa'kallt.

== See also ==
- Secwépemc
- The Shuswap
- Shuswap language
- Sekani
