= Secwepemc Cultural Education Society =

The Secwepemc Cultural Education Society (SCES) is a non-profit organization in Kamloops, British Columbia, Canada. The society was founded in 1983 to preserve and promote the language, culture and history of the Secwepemc First Nation people. In addition to curriculum development and other programs, the society operates the Secwepemc Museum and Heritage Park in Kamloops. It is governed by representatives from thirteen bands of the Secwepemc Nation and a representative from the Secwepemc Elders Council.

== History ==
SCES was incorporated on September 22, 1983, when it focused on language research and communications. By the late 1980s, SCES had six core departments: Secwepemc Resource Centre, Curriculum Development, Research Program and Archives, Shuswap Cultural Gatherings, Workshops and Conferences, The Language Program, and The Secwepemc Museum and Heritage Park. Many of the projects at this time focused on creating audio/visual materials, archiving and offering workshops based on using the internet/email and communication skills in the workplace. In 1986 it offered its first Adult Education course.

Over the years SCES has evolved to offer a wide variety of programs and projects. The Resource Centre is now run by the Secwepemc News, a monthly publication covering news and events in the Secwepemc Territory. The Research Program has been busy working on projects to study the number of fluent speakers, adults learning the language, and students learning the language. Recently SCES received funding for a project that will research Secwepemc Rites of Passage.

The Society's numerous workshops have included financial management and planning, corporate law, employment law, budgeting, study skills for students in Adult Education and understanding Fetal Alcohol Spectrum Disorder. The Language Program has grown to include a series of projects that have created language resource materials such as posters, diagrams and charts, beginner books, advanced books, talking books, audio tapes/CDs, videos & DVDs, teachers guides and computer-based language lessons to accompany books.

SCES has expanded to offer programs for Leadership and Resiliency, Fetal Alcohol Spectrum Disorder, and Adult Literacy.

== Core programs and projects ==
=== Language Department ===
The SCES Language Department was established to preserve and promote Secwepemctsin through a variety of projects and programs.

=== Adult Education Department ===
The purpose of the Adult Education Program is to enable learners to acquire the knowledge and skills needed to promote self-reliance and cultural pride, ultimately leading to employment or entrance to post-secondary institutes.

=== Leadership and Resiliency Program (LRP) ===
This program provides both in-school and after-school services to Aboriginal students attending Four Directions. It is intended to enhance youths' internal strengths and resiliency while minimizing involvement in substance use, violence, and other unhealthy choices and behaviours.

=== Aboriginal Partner Assisted Learning (APAL) ===
The APAL program is a collaborative effort between SCES and Thompson Rivers University (TRU). It was meant to reach the many adult learners with lower levels of literacy who are not comfortable participating in formal classroom-style learning. APAL offers tutoring free, one-to-one, in a relaxed atmosphere. Also the APAL Coordinator, where possible, matches up tutors and learners based on shared experiences or hobbies to try to make the learner more comfortable. The program had the goal of reaching an average of 15 learners per month'

=== Secwepemc Newspaper ===
The Secwepemc News is a monthly publication serving the people and communities of the Secwepemc Nation. The Editor's main focus has been to:

- Research and interview elders and youth for inspiration;
- Upload the newspaper to the SCES website;
- Continue site visits within Kelowna and Vernon to check on distribution process;
- Capitalize on major car dealerships' advertising in Kamloops; and
- Capture events and stories in the Secwepemc area.
