= Canoe Creek Indian Reserve No. 1 =

Indian reserve in British Columbia, Canada

Coordinates: 51°28′00″N 122°08′00″W

Canoe Creek Indian Reserve No. 1, referred to by Statistics Canada as Canoe Creek 1, is an Indian reserve of the Canoe Creek Band/Dog Creek Indian Band of the Secwepemc people, located five miles northeast of the confluence of Canoe Creek with the Fraser River in British Columbia, Canada, in that province's Cariboo district. The reserve is 37.2 ha. in size.

== See also ==
- List of Indian Reserves in British Columbia
- Canoe Creek (disambiguation)
