= Douglas Lake Cattle Company =

Historic ranch in British Columbia, Canada

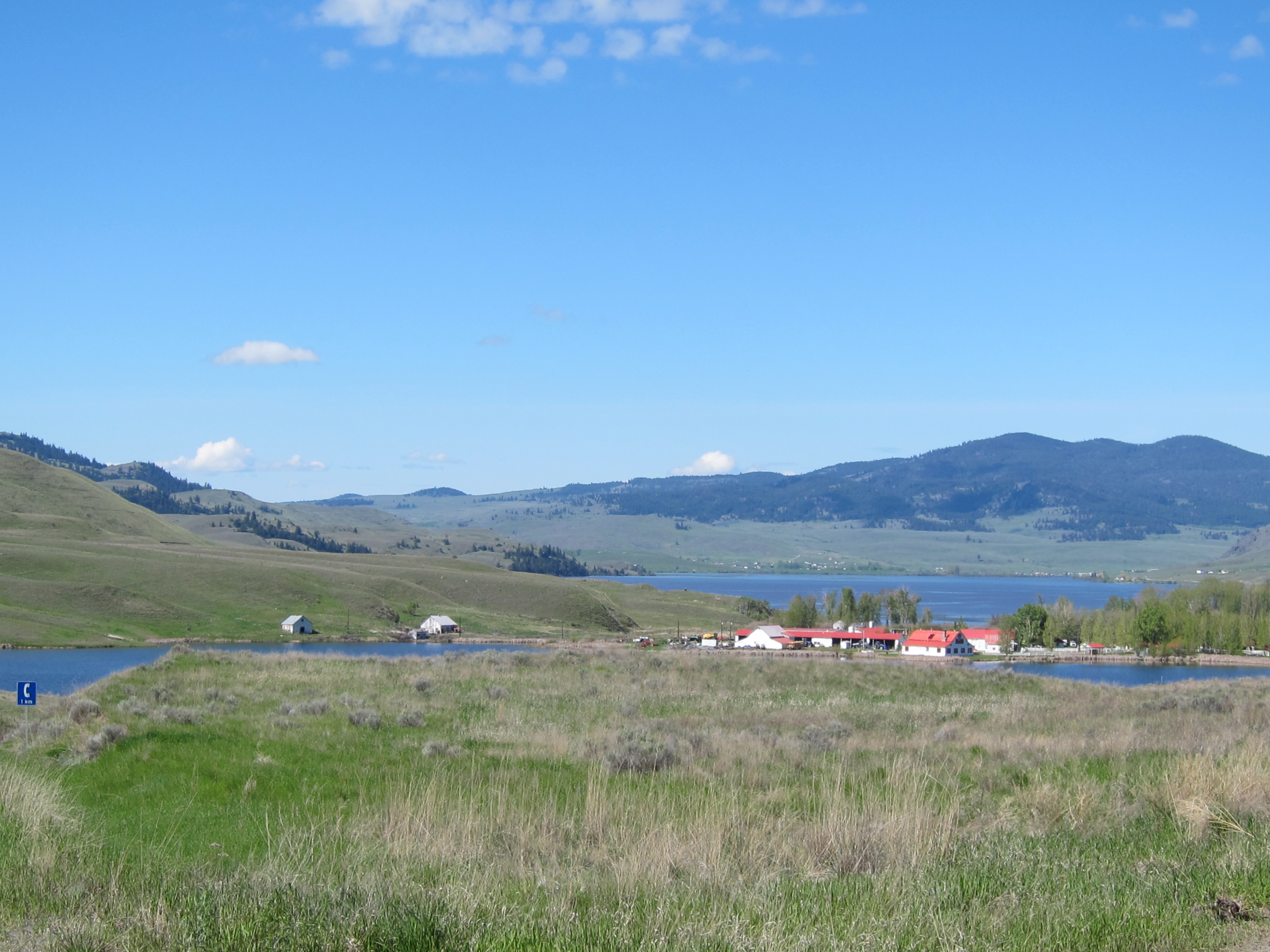
- Ranch headquarters, with Douglas Lake beyond

- Location within British Columbia Location within Canada
- Town/City: Douglas Lake, approximately 57 km (35 mi) south of Kamloops
- Province: British Columbia
- Country: Canada
- Coordinates: 50°09′53″N 120°11′51″W
- Established: 1886
- Website: Douglas Lake Cattle Company

The Douglas Lake Cattle Company, situated south of Kamloops, British Columbia, is Canada's largest working cattle ranch, usually known as the Douglas Lake Ranch. Founded June 30, 1886, it has been operating continuously since. This date also marks the completion of the last leg of the first transcontinental rail line of the Canadian Pacific Railway (CPR) from Montreal to Vancouver.

== History ==
The history of Douglas Lake Ranch spans a period of some 130 years dating back to the mid-1880s. In fact, Douglas Lake Ranch itself traces its name back to 1872 when John Douglas Sr. homesteaded his first 130 ha (320 acres) along its shore of its namesake lake. In 1884 John Douglas Sr. sold this property to Charles Beak, who, along with Joseph Greaves, Charles Thomson and William Ward, founded Douglas Lake Cattle Company. Charles Beak was a cattle rancher who had already amassed some 8,900 ha (22,000 acres) in the Nicola Valley, whereas Greaves, Thomson and Ward were members of a cattle syndicate.

In response to booming demand for beef in rapidly growing Vancouver, the Interior stock industry went into high gear in the wake of the railway's opening, spurring on something of a golden age in British Columbia ranching. In 1892 Charles Beak sold his interest to the remaining shareholders. Greaves and Thomson both remained until 1910 when Ward purchased their interest. By this time, the Ranch had grown to over 45,000 ha (110,000 acres), establishing it as the preeminent ranch in Canada. In 1907 the Nicola branch line of the CPR was built into the Nicola Valley to serve the booming stock operation at Douglas Lake, which was already one of the country's largest and for many years second only to the sprawling Gang Ranch on the west side of the Fraser River, which has since shrunk in scale, leaving the Douglas Lake as the largest.

The Ranch remained under the ownership and management of successive members of the Ward family until 1940. By the turbulent times during the Depression era caused costs of ranching to rise by early 1900 standards. Additionally ranching changed from horsepower to combustion engine. In 1950 the Ward family sold to Colonel Victor Spencer and William Studdert. During the period to April 1951, Frank Ross joined Spencer and Studdert as a third owner. Studdert later sold to Spencer and Ross. By then, the deeded acres had increased to over 59,000 ha (145,000 acres). Spencer and Ross sold Douglas Lake Ranch to Charles (Chunky) Woodward and John West in 1959. West's ownership continued until his death in 1968 at which time Woodward became the sole owner. The Woodward family sold to Bernard J. Ebbers in 1998, a Canadian-born resident of Jackson, Mississippi, who, after the bankruptcy of WorldCom, sold the ranch to Stan Kroenke in 2003.

== Present day Douglas Lake Cattle Ranch ==
The ranch includes leased grazing land as well as directly leased or titled lands and extends to the edge of metropolitan Kamloops and towards Shuswap Lake, spanning most of the high country of the northeastern Thompson Plateau. The purchase of Alkali Lake Ranch, in Williams Lake (near Alkali Lake) in 2008 consisted of 15,000 ha (37,000 acres). The purchase of the James Cattle Company (adjacent to Alkali) in 2012 consisted of 8,900 ha (22,000 acres), the 2013 the purchase of the Quilchena Cattle Company (11,000 ha [28,000 acres]), and the purchase of Riske Creek Ranching in 2015 consists of 8,900 deeded ha (22,000 deeded acres) and 3,800 leased ha (9,500 leased acres) adding an additional 49,000 ha (120,000 acres). And recently the Douglas Lake Cattle Company has acquired the historic Gang Ranch originally called the Canadian Ranching Company, started in 1863. Other ranches owned by the cattle company include historic Quilchena Ranch (established in 1882 near Quilchena), historic Alkali Ranch (est. in 1862), Riske Creek Ranch (est. 1868 at Riske Creek), Deer Park Ranch (est. 1873), and Cotton Ranch (est. 1907).

An important part of the Douglas Cattle Company is quarter horses. In the 1960s CN Woodward became interested in the American Quarter Horse. It started with the purchase of Stardust Desire (#0083564) and Peppy San (#0114978), both went on to become National Cutting Horse Association World Champions. The ranch started quarter horse breeding, raised and trained them. The ranch now raises horses exclusively for its own remuda, but is maintaining the bloodlines that the ranch worked to build in the 1970s and 1980s. In 2004, Douglas Lake Ranch was awarded the distinction by the American Quarter Horse Association with the “Best Remuda” award and in 2013 with the “Legacy Award”.

In addition, Douglas Lake Ranch has a staff of cowboys that are responsible for the movement and well-being of up to 20,000 head of cattle. Douglas Lake Ranch also produces a variety of forage crops from grass, alfalfa to barley, oats and corn. The ranches produce over 45,000 t (44,000 long tons; 50,000 short tons) of feed annually which consists mainly of silage but also includes large hay square bales, green feed and wrapped haylage (a specific type of silage) bales. The ranches farm on over 2,800 ha (7,000 acres) of irrigated crop land between all divisions. All feed produced during the summer months is consumed by the cattle in the winter.

Douglas Lake Cattle Company provides anglers with fishing at exclusive access to Pike's Lake (anglers favourite) and Harry's Dam for day use, which is accessed through Chapperon Lake. There is also a variety of accommodations from a hotel, resort, to yurts, rental homes and camping.

== Legal battles ==
The Douglas Lake Cattle Company has faced many controversies. It has been claimed that early on, the ranch's land holdings were expanded by pressing large amounts of cattle into the pastures of smaller neighbours. While the cattle would later be removed the damage was done. With their feed for the year consumed by Douglas Lake's herd, the homesteaders would be forced to sell.

Douglas Lake Cattle Company has also aggressively restricted access to both private and public lands. By buying up thin strips of land along major arteries they are able to control wide tracts of public range. In many cases locked gates were placed at Douglas Lake. A group of outdoorsmen were threatened with criminal charges over a dispute over access to lakes on the cattle ranch. The Nicola Valley Fish and Game Club were cutting locks on gates across roads that were once public. The club felt that access to the areas that were locked is significant to future generation to get in there. However, ranch officials said that the land on their more than two hundred thousand hectares (five hundred thousand acres) is private. That includes the roads to the popular fishing and hunting grounds near Stoney and Minnie lakes. This dispute went into the court system and goes back to the 1990s.

A court decision was handed down by Supreme Court of British Columbia Justice Joel Groves and the outdoor enthusiasts won over backcountry access in 2018. The lakes and the fish in them belong to the Crown, even when the lakes are surrounded by private property. Removing a road does not equal removing the public's right to access. Groves did not rule on the broader question of the right to access lakes through private land. The judge also chided the provincial government for passively allowing a commercial interest to cut the road. The situation was left up to the Nicola Valley Fish and Game Club to protect the public interest.

In 2020, the B.C. Supreme Court sided with the largest private landowner in the province, the Douglas Lake Cattle Company. A unanimous ruling was brought in by a panel of the British Columbia Court of Appeal which overturned the lower court order and gave the Douglas Cattle Company the right to block access to Crown-owned Stoney and Minnie lakes, which are within the huge ranch east of Merritt, Justice Peter Willcock says the province's lack of public access legislation entitles the ranch to restrict access, even though public fishing is still allowed on each lake and a portion of a road near one of the lakes remains public.

== See also ==
- Douglas Lake Airport, owned and operated by the company
- List of historic ranches in British Columbia
