= Shuswap Nation Tribal Council =

The Shuswap Nation Tribal Council is a First Nations tribal council in the Canadian province of British Columbia. It is Based in the Thompson and Shuswap Districts of the Central Interior, and includes one band on the upper Columbia River in the East Kootenay region. It is one of two tribal councils of the Secwepemc people, the other being the Northern Shuswap Tribal Council of the Cariboo region further to the north. The council is based in Kamloops, British Columbia.

== Member governments ==
- Adams Lake Indian Band (Sexqeltqin)
- Tkʼemlúps te Secwépemc (T'Kemlups)
- Shuswap Indian Band (Kenpesq't, at Invermere)
- Neskonlith Indian Band, (Sk'etsin at Salmon Arm and Chase)
- Skeetchestn Indian Band, (at Savona)
- Splatsin te Secwépemc (Enderby)
- Bonaparte Indian Band (St'uxwtews, near Cache Creek)
- Whispering Pines/Clinton Indian Band (Pelltiq't, at Clinton)
- Simpcw First Nation (at Barriere)

Four Secwepemc bands do not belong to either the Shuswap Nation Tribal Council or the Northern Shuswap Tribal Council, these being the Esk'etemc First Nation, the High Bar First Nation (Llenlleney'ten), the Skwlax te Secwepemculecw (Skwlax, at Chase)and the Ts'kw'aylaxw First Nation. The Ts'kw'aylaxw First Nation are also members of the Lillooet Tribal Council.

== See also ==
- Northern Shuswap Tribal Council
- Secwepemc
- Shuswap language (Secwepemcstin)
- Gustafsen Lake Standoff
- List of tribal councils in British Columbia
