= Gang Ranch =

Cattle ranch in British Columbia, Canada

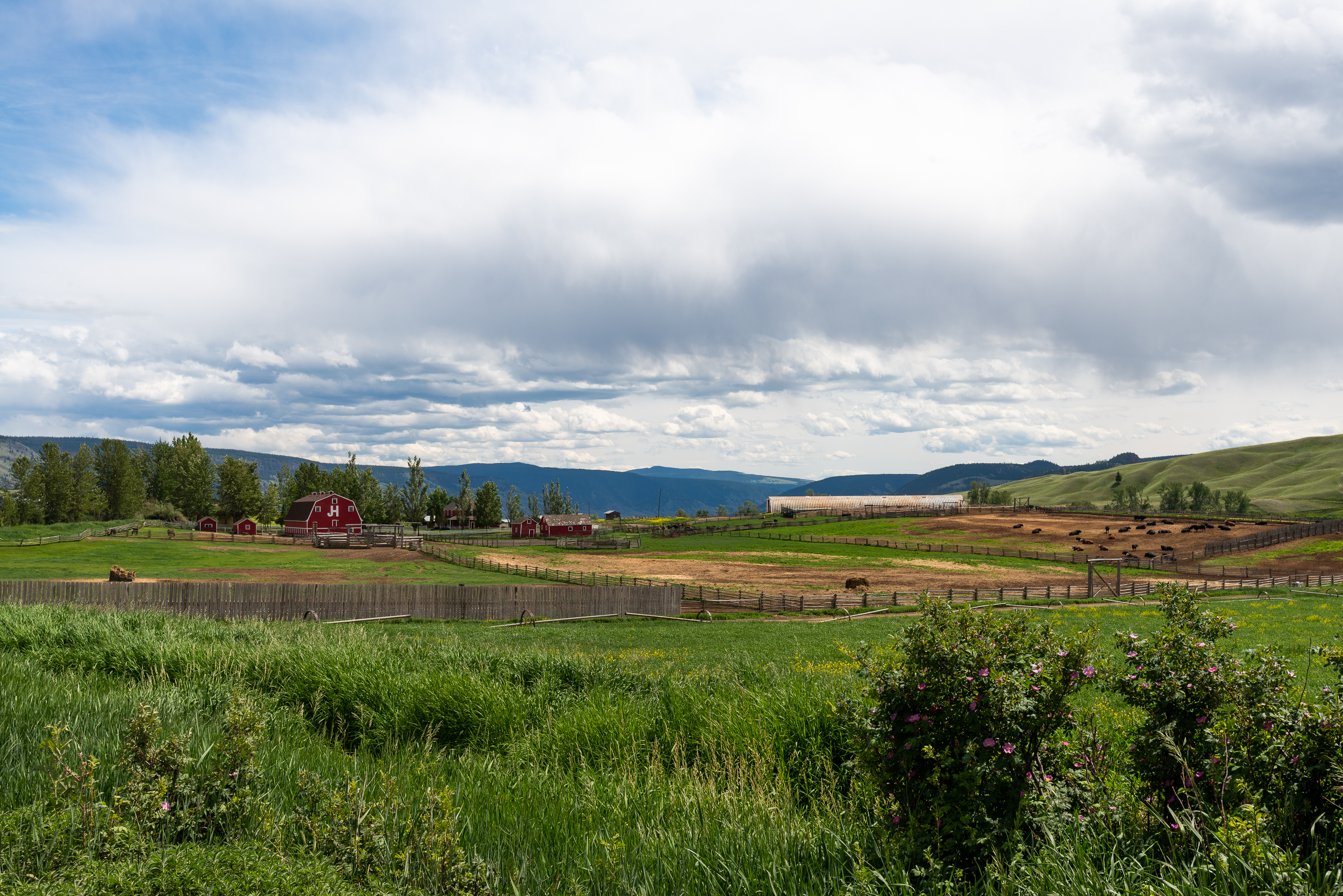
- Interactive map of Gang Ranch
- Province: British Columbia
- Country: Canada
- Coordinates: 51°33′00″N 122°20′01″W
- Established: 1863
- Owner: Douglas Lake Cattle Company
- Produces: Cattle

The Gang Ranch is a cattle ranching operation in the Cariboo-Chilcotin region of the Canadian province of British Columbia. Established in 1863 by two brothers, Jerome and Thaddeus Harper, the ranch was the largest ranch and largest private landholding in the province for many years. It is located to the west of the Fraser River, south of the city of Williams Lake.

== History ==
The Harper brothers left Tucker County, West Virginia, in 1840, after losing their family farm to foreclosure. After working as freight haulers and cattle drivers in the midwest and Montana, the brothers were drawn to California by the 1849 gold rush. The brothers moved north, and by 1854, they had entered British North America and the future colony of British Columbia. They established a sawmill near Yale in 1859. The brothers bought their first cattle ranch near Kamloops soon after. Supporters of the Confederacy in the United States Civil War, the brothers joined a group in Victoria that sought to build a ship to engage in piracy directed at Union forces on the west coast.

In the mid-1860s, the brothers scouted for new grazing land on the Fraser River. In 1865, Thaddeus obtained a land grant for a parcel on the west bank of the river, near Canoe Creek. This first parcel, located on Gaspard Creek in what would be called the Home Ranch Valley, became the Gang Ranch. They expanded the holdings gradually over the following decades. Jerome was injured by a horse in 1870, and his health declined. Thaddeus took over operations of the ranch.

The Harpers also purchased two other holdings in the British Columbia Interior, incorporating them with the Gang Ranch. The Perry Ranch was near the town of Clinton, and the Harper Ranch was located on the South Thompson River east of the city of Kamloops. These two holdings formed a transportation route for moving cattle from the Cariboo region south to the United States, and, after 1886, to the new transcontinental Canadian Pacific railway line that passed through the Thompson river valley. The Gang Ranch would eventually also operate several other smaller holdings in the region, including ranches near Jesmond, 59 Mile House, and a feedlot in the Lower Mainland city of New Westminster. At its height, the ranch had 8000 to 10000 head of cattle.

=== Western Canada Cattle Company ===
The Harpers brought in a British investor, Thomas Galpin, in 1884, and the new joint venture, called the Western Canada Cattle Company, bought up more rangeland and small properties in the region. By the late 1880s, Thaddeus Harper had taken on heavy debt from mining investments and lost his equity in the ranch. The Galpin family ran the ranch until the 1940s, and modernized much the operations with improved farming equipment and facilities. By 1947, the company was in deep debt, and the ranch was put to auction. An American rancher, Floyd Skelton, and a Canadian entrepreneur, Bill Studdert, purchased the operation that year. Their company owned and operated the ranch until 1978. Studdert had died 1971 from an heart attack, and the ranch was sold to settle his estate taxes. Dale Alsager, an Albertan scientist and rancher, purchased the ranch in 1978, and restored some of the historical buildings at the ranch headquarters. The ranch was foreclosed on in 1984 by the Canadian Imperial Bank of Commerce (CIBC). After lengthy legal battles and appeals, ownership was transferred to a Saudi Arabian company, B.S.A. Investors.

Ibrahim Afandi bought out the other members of the investment group, and became the sole owner of the ranch in 1988. In 2004, Afandi was named in a U.S. lawsuit as an alleged funder of the Al-Qaeda leader, Osama Bin-Laden. He was not charged in Canada or the United States. In 2022, the Douglas Lake Cattle Company purchased the ranch.

== Name and brand ==
There is some uncertainty as to why the Harpers used the name 'Gang' for the ranch. One theory says it refers to a 'gang' of employees, while another credits it to the use of a large 'gang' plow on the farms adjacent to the ranch headquarters.

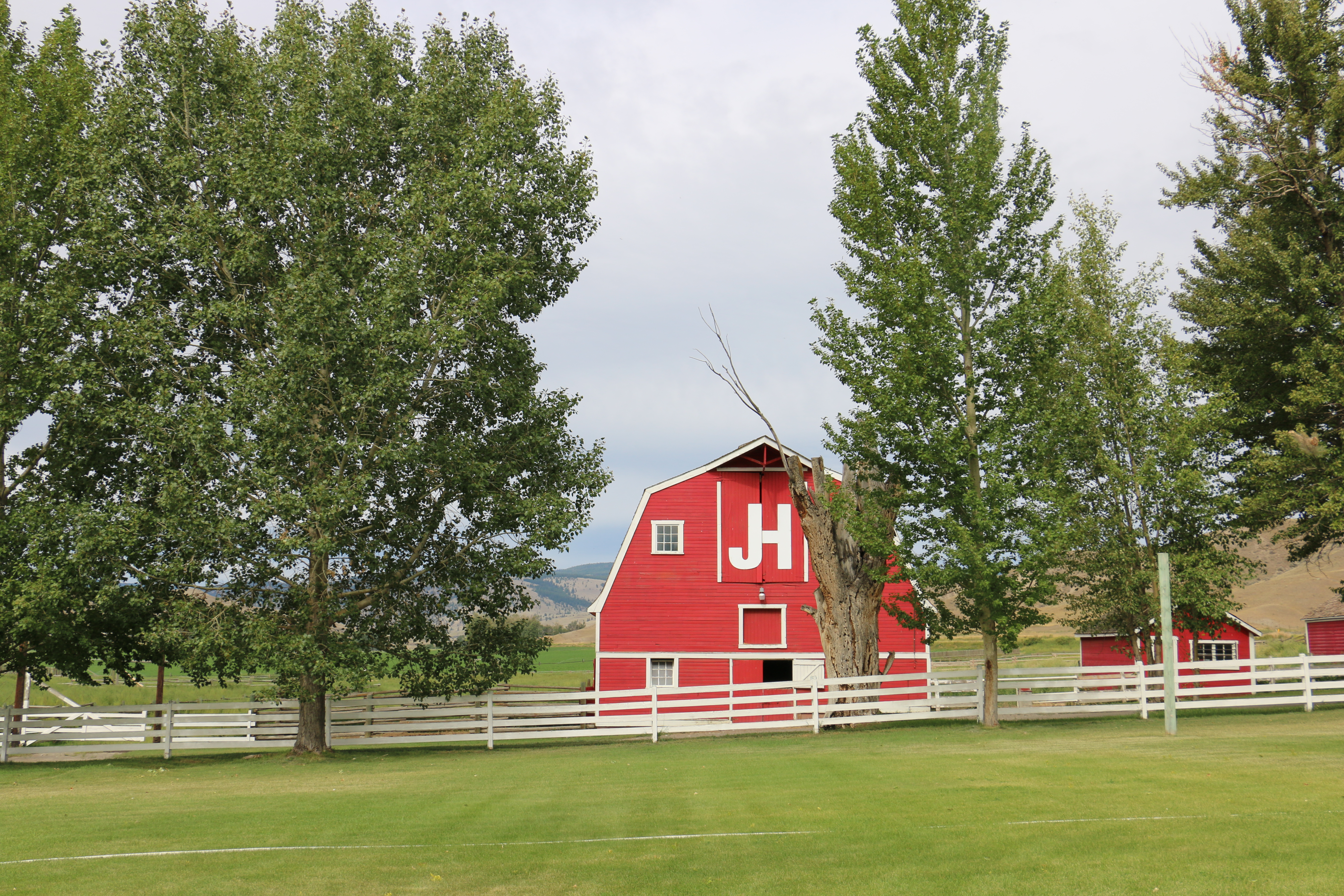
Barn at the ranch headquarters, displaying the ranch's brand

The ranch uses a cattle brand that stylizes an upper-case "J", for Jerome Harper, and a upper-case "T" rotated 90 degrees, for Thaddeus Harper. Together, they also form an "H" to represent the Harper family name. It was first registered with the government of the new Province of British Columbia in 1886. It is the oldest registered cattle brand still in use in the province.

== Modern operations ==
The ranch headquarters are located west of the Fraser River southwest of the city of Williams Lake. The ranch currently has over 11,000 hectares (27,000 acres) of private land, and has grazing rights to over 400,000 hectares (990,000 acres) of public land. In 2024, the ranch employed about six working cowboys, a Cow Boss, as well as a number of herding dogs. Ranch staff move the cattle across large distances between summer and winter ranges, often riding 40 to 50 kilometres (25 to 31 mi) a day.
