= Canoe Creek =

Canoe Creek may refer to:

- Canoe Creek (volcano), a volcano in British Columbia
- Canoe Creek (British Columbia), a tributary of the Fraser River in the Cariboo region of British Columbia
  - Canoe Creek Band/Dog Creek Indian Band, a.k.a. the Canoe Creek Indian Band, a band government of the Secwepemc people in the area of Canoe Creek
    - Canoe Creek Indian Reserve No. 1 an Indian Reserve of the Canoe Creek Band/Dog Creek Indian Band in the Cariboo region of British Columbia, Canada
    - Canoe Creek Indian Reserve No. 2 an Indian Reserve of the Canoe Creek Band/Dog Creek Indian Band in the Cariboo region of British Columbia, Canada
    - Canoe Creek Indian Reserve No. 3 an Indian Reserve of the Canoe Creek Band/Dog Creek Indian Band in the Cariboo region of British Columbia, Canada
- Canoe Creek, Ontario, in Parry Sound District, Ontario
- Canoe Creek (Upper Iowa River), a tributary of the Upper Iowa River
- Canoe Creek State Park, a state park in Pennsylvania, USA
- Canoe Creek, Pennsylvania, a populated place near Canoe Creek State Park
