= Secwepemc Museum and Heritage Park =

Secwepemc Museum & Heritage Park
- Location: Kamloops, British Columbia, Canada
- Coordinates: 50.6785°N 120.2946°W
- Type: Museum and Heritage Park
- Website: Secwépemc Museum and Heritage Park

The Secwepemc Museum and Heritage Park is an indoor and outdoor museum with the purpose of preserving and promoting the cultural heritage of the Secwépemc people, located in Kamloops, British Columbia.

== Displays ==
The inside of the museum has three different galleries showcasing the cultural and traditional lives of the Secwepemc people.

The Heritage Park consists of a trail along the South Thompson River which allows visitors to explore a 2000-year-old pithouse and an ethnobotanical garden which is filled with traditional Secwepemc plants.

== Affiliations ==
The Museum is affiliated with: CMA, CHIN, and Virtual Museum of Canada.
