= Chief Atahm School =

Immersion school in British Columbia, Canada

Chief Atahm School is an immersion school working to revive the Secwepemc language. It is located on the Adams Lake reserve near the town of Chase, British Columbia. The school is operated by parents.
