= Williams Lake (Goffs) =

Lake in Nova Scotia, Canada

Williams Lake, Goffs
- Location within Nova Scotia
- Location: Halifax Regional Municipality, Nova Scotia
- Coordinates: 44°48′50.9″N 63°26′57″W
- Basin countries: Canada

Williams Lake, Goffs is a lake of Halifax Regional Municipality, in Goffs, Nova Scotia, Canada.

== See also ==
- List of lakes in Nova Scotia
