= Williams Lake (Cumberland) =

Lake in Cumberland County, Nova Scotia, Canada

- Location within Nova Scotia
- Location: Cumberland County, Nova Scotia
- Coordinates: 45°46′16.9″N 63°40′7.9″W
- Basin countries: Canada

Williams Lake is a lake of Cumberland County, in Nova Scotia, Canada.

== See also ==
- List of lakes in Nova Scotia
