= Canoe Creek Indian Reserve No. 2 =

Indian reserve in British Columbia, Canada

Coordinates: 51°26′00″N 122°03′00″W

Canoe Creek Indian Reserve No. 2, known officially as Canoe Creek 2, is an Indian reserve in British Columbia, Canada, governed by the Canoe Creek/Dog Creek Indian Band, located six miles east of the mouth of Canoe Creek into the Fraser River.

== See also ==
- List of Indian reserves in British Columbia
- Canoe Creek (disambiguation)
