= Canoe Creek (British Columbia) =

Creek in British Columbia, Canada

Coordinates: 51°26′57″N 122°14′19″W

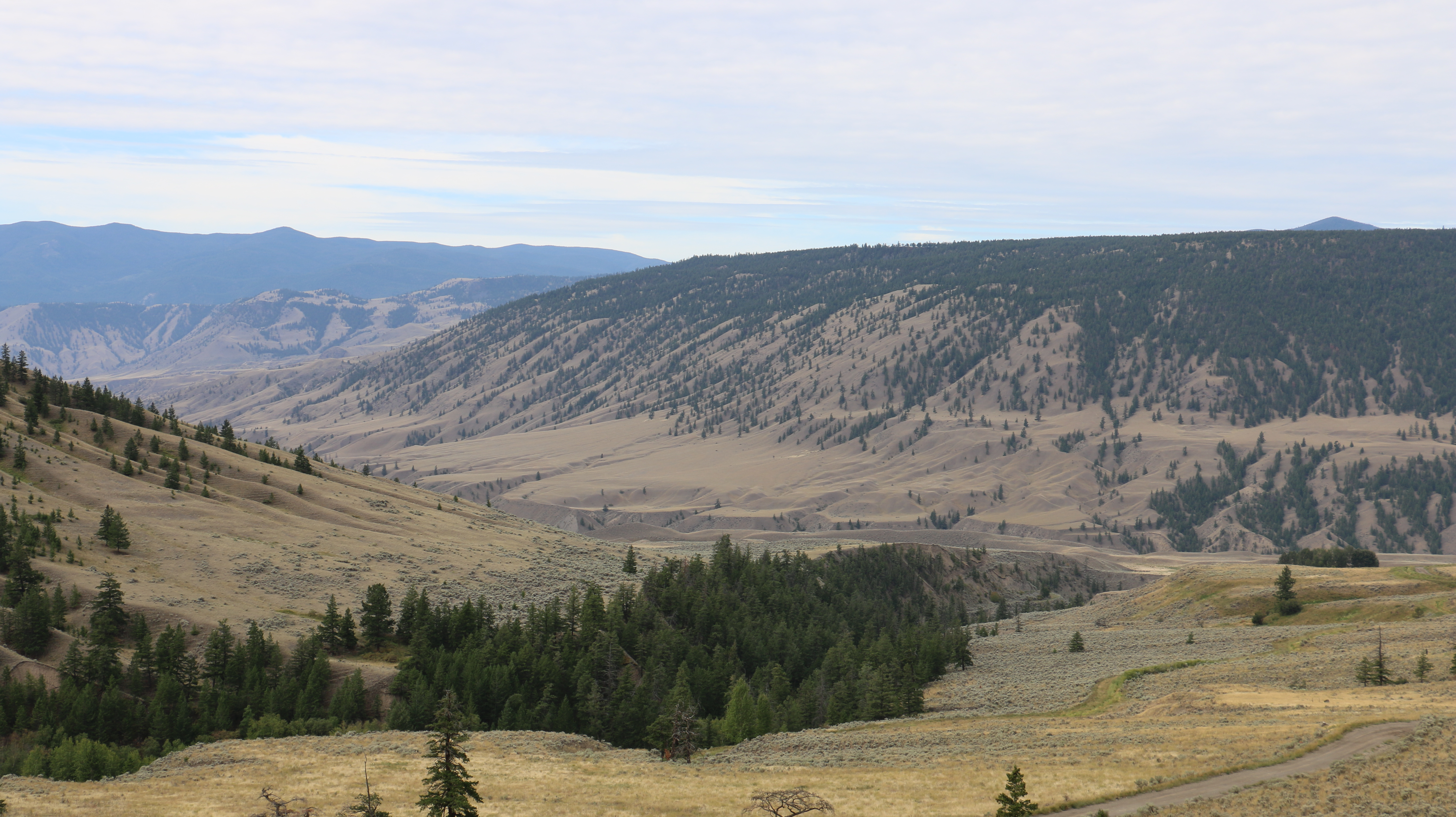
Canoe Creek flows down toward the Fraser River valley.

Canoe Creek is a creek flowing generally west in a zigzag course into the Fraser River in the Cariboo region of British Columbia, Canada, joining that river south of Gang Ranch.

== Name ==
Though one source says the name derives from a canoe early miners found at the location, the original version of the name in French was La Rivière du Canot, so named because it was here that explorer Simon Fraser cached his canoe and continued his journey southward down the river on foot. His crew named the location Le Canot.

== Related placenames ==
Canoe Creek is the namesake of three of the Indian reserves of the Canoe Creek Band/Dog Creek Indian Band:

- Canoe Creek Indian Reserve No. 1
- Canoe Creek Indian Reserve No. 2
- Canoe Creek Indian Reserve No. 3

== See also ==
- Canoe Creek (disambiguation)
