= Williams Lake (Halifax) =

Lake in Nova Scotia, Canada

Williams Lake, Halifax
- Location within Nova Scotia
- Location: Halifax Regional Municipality, Nova Scotia
- Coordinates: 44°37′11.9″N 63°35′43″W
- Basin countries: Canada

Williams Lake, Halifax is a lake of the Halifax Regional Municipality, in Nova Scotia, Canada.

== History ==
Williams Lake was created in the late 18th century by settlers who collected rainwater to build a dam. In 1968, the Williams Lake Conservation Company was founded to preserve the lake. The current head of the company is Murray Coolican.

== Geography ==
Williams Lake is located at Cunard Junior High School. It is just outside the community of Spryfield and is approximately 7 km from Downtown Halifax.

== See also ==
- List of lakes in Nova Scotia
