= Williams Lake (Jeddore) =

Lake in Nova Scotia, Canada

Williams Lake, Jeddore
- Location within Nova Scotia
- Location: Halifax Regional Municipality, Nova Scotia
- Coordinates: 44°43′2″N 63°3′1″W
- Basin countries: Canada

Williams Lake, Jeddore is a lake of Halifax Regional Municipality in Jeddore, Nova Scotia, Canada.

== See also ==
- List of lakes in Nova Scotia
