= Eskʼetemc =

First Nation in British Columbia, Canada

The Eskʼetemc are a First Nations people in the Cariboo Regional District of the Canadian province of British Columbia. They are a subgroup of the Secwepemc people and reside around the community of Alkali Lake, an unincorporated settlement and Indian Reserve community on the Cariboo Plateau south of the city of Williams Lake.

Their band government was formerly called the Alkali Lake Indian Band.

The current chief of the Esk'etemc First Nation is Fred Robbins.

The Eskʼetemc have control over some regional resources through ownership of companies such as forest management company Alkali Resource Management Ltd. (ARM), which is owned by the Esk'etemc Nation.

Orange Shirt Day, a day created to raise awareness of the Canadian Residential School System, was started in 2013 after Phyllis Jack Webstad spoke at the St. Joseph Mission (SJM) Residential School Commemoration Project held in Williams Lake. Esk'etemc chief Fred Robbins has been credited with starting the project.
