= Williams Lake (British Columbia) =

Lake in Cariboo Regional District, British Columbia, Canada

- Location within British Columbia
- Location: British Columbia
- Coordinates: 52°07′01″N 122°04′19″W
- Primary inflows: San Jose River
- Primary outflows: Williams Lake River
- Catchment area: 2,240 km^{2} (860 sq mi)
- Basin countries: Canada
- Max. length: 7.2 km (4.5 mi)
- Max. width: 1.3 km (0.81 mi)
- Surface area: 7.2 km^{2} (2.8 sq mi)
- Average depth: 12.2 m (40 ft)
- Max. depth: 24.1 m (79 ft)
- Water volume: 0.088 km^{3} (71,000 acre⋅ft)
- Residence time: ca. 1.9 years
- Surface elevation: 565 m (1,854 ft)
- Settlements: Williams Lake

Williams Lake is a lake in the city of the same name in the Cariboo region of the Central Interior of British Columbia, Canada. Williams Lake Indian Reserve No. 1, a.k.a. "Sugarcane Reserve" is located around the east end of the lake. British Columbia provincial highway 97, the Cariboo Highway, runs along the lake's northern side.

It is fed by the northwest-flowing San Jose River and drained to the Fraser River via the Williams Lake River.

== Climate and Hydrography ==
Williams Lake has relatively lower water temperatures, because of its lower elevation compared to other lakes on the Cariboo Plateau.

== See also ==
- List of lakes of British Columbia
