= Canoe Creek Indian Reserve No. 3 =

Indian reserve in British Columbia, Canada

Coordinates: 51°32′00″N 122°15′00″W

Canoe Creek Indian Reserve No. 3, known officially as Canoe Creek 3, is an Indian reserve governed by the Canoe Creek/Dog Creek Indian Band, located four miles south of the mouth of Dog Creek into the Fraser River.

== See also ==
- List of Indian reserves in British Columbia
- Canoe Creek (disambiguation)
