= Williams Lake River =

Watercourse in British Columbia, Canada

Coordinates: 52°10′N 122°16′W

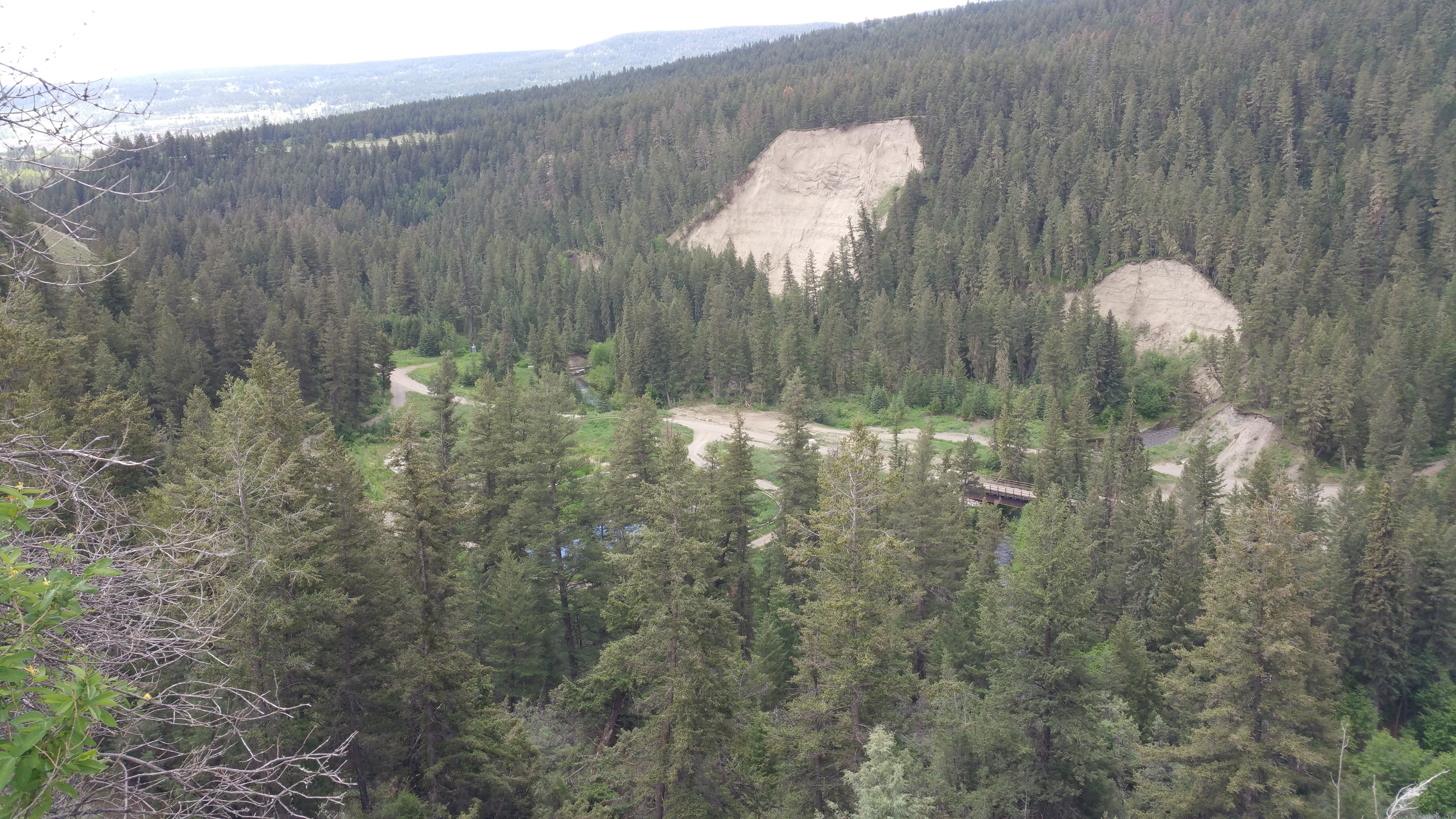
Trails running trough the river valley of Williams Lake river

Williams Lake River is a tributary of the Fraser River in the Canadian province of British Columbia.

== Course ==
Williams Lake River originates in Williams Lake, whose main tributary is the San Jose River. From Williams Lake the Williams Lake River flows a short distance west to join the Fraser River.

== See also ==
- List of rivers of British Columbia
