= San Jose River =

Canadian river at the Cariboo region

Coordinates: 52°07′00″N 122°02′00″W

The San Jose River is a river in the Cariboo region of the Central Interior of British Columbia, Canada. It rises in the area just northwest of 100 Mile House and includes in its watershed Lac La Hache, flowing northwestwards from there to its mouth at the head of Williams Lake, at the city of the same name. Williams Lake is drained by the Williams Lake River, effectively the continuation of the San Jose, and flows only a short distance before entering the Fraser River just west of the city.

The river is named after José Tressierra, a Mexican who was one of the first non-Indigenous settlers in the area, in the 1850s or 1860s.

== See also ==
- List of rivers of British Columbia
