= Northern Shuswap Tribal Council =

First Nations government in the Canadian province of British Columbia

The Northern Shuswap Tribal Council is a First Nations government in the Canadian province of British Columbia. Based in the Cariboo District of the Central Interior, it is one of two tribal councils of the Secwepemc people, the other being the Shuswap Nation Tribal Council of the Thompson-Shuswap region farther south.

== Member governments ==
- Canim Lake Band (Tsq'escen')
- Xat'sull First Nation (Xat'sull/Cm'etem)
- Williams Lake Indian Band (T'exelc)
- Stswecem'c Xget'tem First Nation (Stswecem'c/Xgat'tem)

== See also ==
- Shuswap Nation Tribal Council
- Secwepemc
- Shuswap language (Secwepemcstin)
- List of tribal councils in British Columbia
