= Secwépemc =

First Nations people in Canada

Secwepemc; Shuswap
Secwépemc
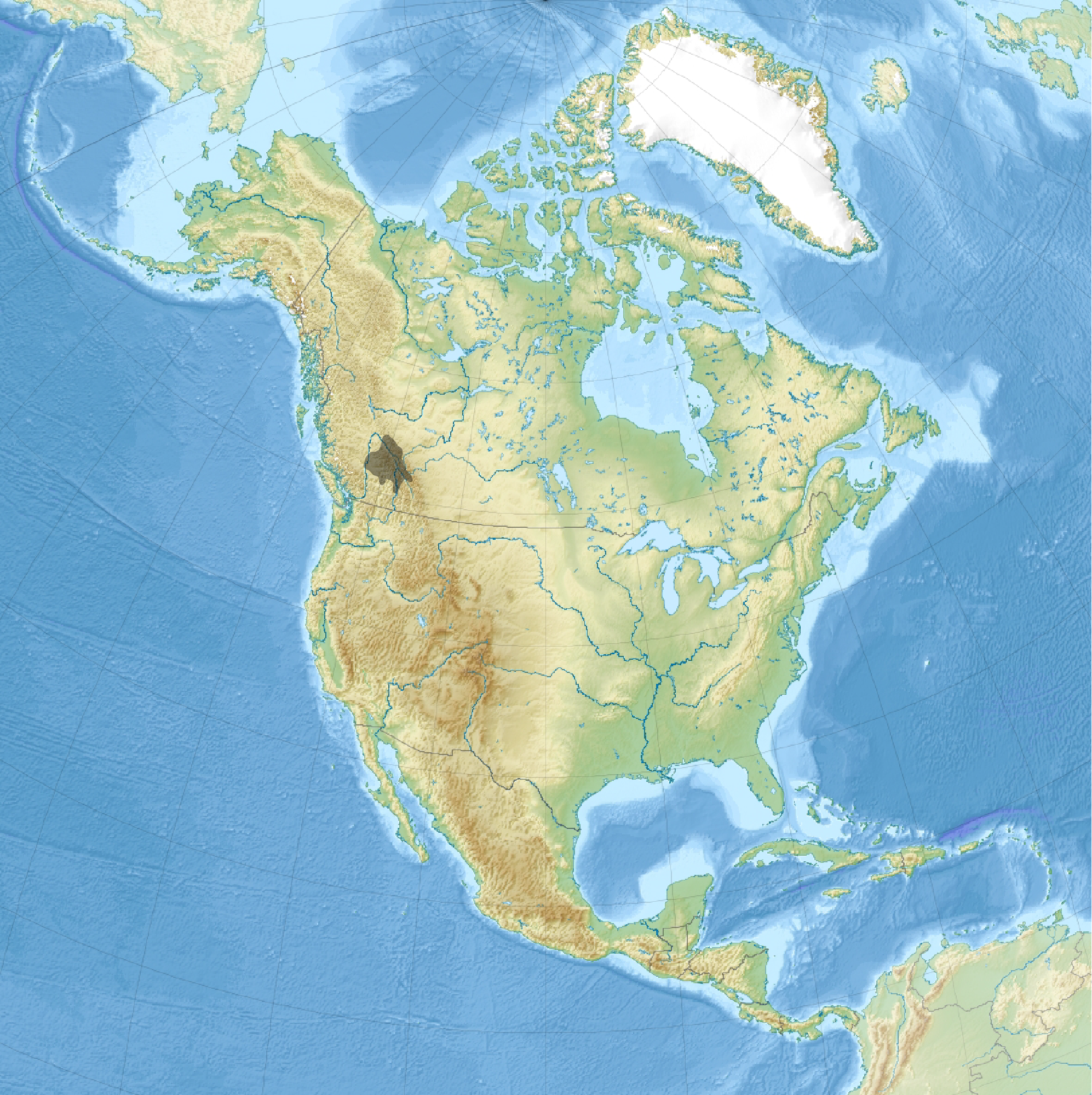
- Location and extent of Secwepemcúĺecw

Total population
- 6,755 (Including those of mixed ancestry) (2016)

Regions with significant populations
- Canada (British Columbia)

Languages
- Secwepemctsín, Secwepemcékst

Religion
- other Interior Salish peoples

Secwépemc (Shuswap)
- People: Secwépemc
- Language: Secwepemctsín; Secwepemcékst
- Country: Secwepemcúl̓ecw

The Secwépemc (/ʃəxhwɛpˈmɪx/ shəkh-whep-MIKH; Secwepemctsín: [ʃəˈxʷɛpməx] or [səˈxʷɛpməx]), also known by the exonym Shuswap (/ˈʃuːʃwɑːp/ SHOOSH-wahp), are a First Nation people residing in the interior of British Columbia in Canada. They speak Secwepemctsín or Shuswap, an Interior Salish language.

Secwepemcúĺecw, the traditional territory or country of the Shuswap people, ranges from the eastern Chilcotin Plateau, bordering Tŝilhqot'in Country, and the Cariboo Plateau southeast through Thompson Country to Kamloops. It spans the Selkirk Mountains and Big Bend of the Columbia River to include the northern part of the Columbia Valley region. Their historical territory is the largest in Southern BC and covers ~145,000 square kilometres. Traditionally, they depended on hunting, trading and fishing to support their communities. They have an oral history that spans back ~10,000 years.

== History, language and culture ==
They speak one of the Salishan languages. Based on 2006 statistics, the Secwepemc are likely the most numerous of the Interior Salish peoples of British Columbia.

Their traditional language is Secwepemctsín (Salishan pronunciation: [ʃəxwəpməxtˈʃin]). Based on statistics from the 2006 census, there were roughly 1,600 speakers. However as of 2026, the number of fully fluent speakers has diminished to less than 100 individuals, with all of them being over the age 70. There are, however, efforts to revitalise their language. For instance, Secwepemctsín is being taught in Chief Atahm School, which offers an immersion program to students from K-9. In addition, Simon Fraser University̓s Indigenous Language Program offers both certificates & diplomas in proficiency of the language in addition to a post-graduate Master's program.

The Secwépemc have always stressed the importance of recognizing their title to the land. In 1910, the Secwépemc Chiefs addressed a memorial to Prime Minister Laurier in the 1910 Memorial to Sir Wilfred Laurier. This document laid out the cumulative grievances of the Secwépemc, based on the previous 50 years of European-Canadian settlement in their territory. Since the late 20th century, the Secwépemc people have created a number of organizations, institutions, and initiatives to help their people, including the Shuswap Nation Tribal Council, the Northern Shuswap Nation Tribal Council, Stkémlupsemc te Secwépemc Nation (SSN), among others.

Captive slaves were historically an important commodity to the Secwépemc, and the Secwépemc would raid other bands, and then sell the captives back in exchange for salmon. Very few captives were kept as household slaves.

== Traditional Secwépemc tribal divisions and bands ==
- Setlemuk (Sétlemc, Setlomuk, Sétlhemx) or Cañon Division, or Canyon Shuswap, west of the Fraser River, from about Churn Creek to beyond Riske Creek.
  - Subdivisions: Riskie Creek, North Canyon, South Canyon, Chilcotin Mouth. The 1862 Pacific Northwest smallpox epidemic almost wiped out the Canyon Shuswap. The survivors joined with the Alkali Lake band (Esketemc).
- Skstellnemuk (Sxstélenemc, Sxstélenemx) or Shuswap Lake Division, on the Upper South Thompson River, Shuswap Lake, and Spallumcheen River.
  - Subdivisions: South Thompson, Adams Lake (now Sexqeltqin), Shuswap Lake, Spallumcheen, Arrow Lake. Now known as the Neskonlith Indian Band.
- Stietamuk (Styétemc, Styétemx, "interior people") or Lake Division, the interior of the plateau between Fraser and North Thompson rivers.
  - Subdivisions: Lac la Hache, Green Timber, and Canim Lake (Tsq'escen'). Only the last band survived the diseases of the 1800s, absorbing the surviving members of the Green Timber band. The few survivors of the Lac La Hache band merged with the Williams Lake Band (T’exelcemc)
- Stkamlulepsemuk (Stk̓emlúlepsemc, Secwépemcùw'i, Sekwapmukoe) or Kamloops Division, the people of Kamloops and Savona.
  - Subdivisions: Savona or Deadman's Creek, Kamloops (Stkamluleps).
- Stlemhulehamuk (Stlemxuxwlemc) or Fraser River Division, in the valley of Fraser River from High Bar to Soda Creek, including the people of Clinton.
  - Subdivisions: Soda Creek, Buckskin Creek, Williams Lake (T'exelc) or Sugar Cane, Alkali Lake (Esketemc), Dog Creek, Canoe Creek, Empire Valley, Big Bar, High Bar (Llenlleney'ten), Clinton.
- Texqa'kallt (Tqéqeltemc, Tqéqeltkemx) or North Thompson Division, people of the North Thompson region.
  - Subdivisions: Upper North Thompson, Lower North Thompson, Kinbaskets. The Kinbasket or Kenpésqt are an offshoot of the Upper North Thompson and Shuswap Lake division, and are now called the Shuswap band Kenpesq't
- Zaktcinemuk (Sextsinemc, Sexcinemx) or Bonaparte Division, in the valley of the Bonaparte River to near Ashcroft on the main Thompson, Cache Creek, Loon Lake, the lower part of Hat Creek, through Marble Canyon to Pavilion, and on both sides of the Fraser River near that point.
  - Subdivisions: Pavilion (Ts'kw'aylaxw First Nation), Bonaparte River (now St’uxwtewsemc, or Stuctwesemc, "people of the Valley"), and Main Thompson (Snek'w7étkwemc, Snekwaˀetkwemx), who became extinct as a people during the late 19th century.

== Notable Secwépemc people ==
- Darrell Dennis, comedian, actor, screenwriter and radio personality
- Grace Dove, actress and television host
- Arthur Manuel, political leader and activist (George Manuel's son)
- George Manuel, president of the National Indian Brotherhood and founding president of the World Council of Indigenous Peoples
- Vera Manuel, poet and playwright (George Manuel's daughter)
- Bev Sellars, writer and activist
- Mary Augusta Tappage, storyteller and midwife
- Phyllis Webstad, author and creator of Orange Shirt Day
- Tania Willard, curator and artist

== See also ==
- Shuswap Nation Tribal Council
- Northern Shuswap Tribal Council
- Secwepemc Museum and Heritage Park
- Secwepemc Cultural Education Society
- Handbook of North American Indians, Volume 12
