= Shuswap language =

Interior Salish language of Canada

Shuswap
- Secwepemctsín
- Pronunciation: [səxʷəpəmxˈtʃin]
- Native to: Canada
- Region: Central and Southern Interior of British Columbia
- Ethnicity: 9,860 Secwepemc (2014, FPCC)
- Native speakers: 420 (2021 census)
- Language family: Salishan: Interior Salish; Northern; Shuswap
- Writing system: Duployan shorthand (historical); Latin (current)

Official status
- Regulated by: Secwepemc Cultural Education Society

Language codes
- ISO 639-3: shs
- Glottolog: shus1248
- ELP: Secwepemctsin (Shuswap)
- Shuswap is classified as Definitely Endangered by the UNESCO Atlas of the World's Languages in Danger.

Secwépemc (Shuswap)
- People: Secwépemc
- Language: Secwepemctsín; Secwepemcékst
- Country: Secwepemcúl̓ecw

Shuswap (/ˈʃuːʃwɑːp/; Secwepemctsín [səxʷəpəmxˈtʃin]) is a northern Interior Salish language traditionally spoken by the Secwépemc or Shuswap people of British Columbia. An endangered language, Shuswap is spoken mainly in the Central and Southern Interior of British Columbia between the Fraser River and the Rocky Mountains. According to the First Peoples' Cultural Council, 200 people speak Shuswap as a mother tongue, and there are 1,190 semi-speakers.

Shuswap is the northernmost of the Interior Salish languages, which are spoken in Canada and the Pacific Northwest of the United States. There are two dialects of Shuswap:

- Eastern: Kinbasket (Kenpesq't) and Shuswap Lake (Qw7ewt/Quaaout)
- Western: Canim Lake (Tsq'escen), Chu Chua (Simpcw), Deadman's Creek (Skitsestn/Skeetchestn)–Kamloops (Tk'emlups), Fraser River (Splatsin, Esk'et), and Pavilion (Tsk'weylecw)–Bonaparte (St'uxtews)

The other Northern Interior Salish languages are Lillooet and Thompson.

Most of the material in this article is from Kuipers (1974).

== Language decline ==
Many Indigenous languages, including Secwepemctsín, experienced rapid decline with the institution of the residential schools. These schools prohibited the use of Indigenous languages in speech and in writing, resulting in two to three generations of students who were severely punished for not using English. Although some children forced to attend these residential schools can still speak their mother tongue, they have experienced much trauma which has great negative consequences on the future generations.

After residential schools were shut down, Indigenous children entered the English-dominated mainstream schooling system. Inter-generational transmission of Indigenous languages was severely disrupted due to the dominance of English in education and in the workplace. This further contributed to the drastic decline of Indigenous languages. For example, the number of fluent speakers of Secwepemctsín had dwindled to 3.5 per cent of the Secwépemc population by the mid-1990s.

== Language revitalization and technology ==
An interface to Facebook is available in Secwepemctsín. The First Voices website has a Secwepemctsin (Eastern Dialect) Community Portal, a Secwepemc Community Portal, and a Splatsin (Eastern dialect) Community Portal for language learning. A November 2012 article estimated about 150 fluent speakers, mostly over 65, adding that "an estimated 400 students are learning the language, and "the majority of Secwepemctsin learners are under age 19." Secwépemc language applications are available for iOS. The Secwepemc Cultural Education Society released Nintendo DSi software in 2013 that teaches Secwepemctsin to young children. A language authority of ten elder fluent speakers, from East, West, and the North, are recording pronunciation. As of 2013, a language tutor was also in preparation, exportable onto CD for use offline. David Lacho, a University of British Columbia master's student, developed an augmented reality storybook app called Tuwitames, available on the Apple App Store, to help people learn the Splatsin dialect of Secwepemctsín in support of the community's language revitalization initiatives.

A cseyseten (language nest) at Adams Lake is conducted entirely in the Secwepemc language. A language nest program in Secwepemctsín also takes place with the Splatsin Tsm7aksaltn (Splatsin Teaching Centre) Society where the grandmothers (kikia7a) interact with and teach the children. On January 21, 2013, Thompson Rivers University began offering a Secwepemctsín language class taught by fluent speaker Janice Billy.

== Phonology ==
The Shuswap language has many consonants which the Roman alphabet is typically not used to represent. Two systems of representing Shuswap sounds are in use. One is the system used in Kuipers' 298-page monograph on the language. It uses some letters which are not part of the Roman alphabet. The other, more popular system is based on one devised by Randy Bouchard of the British Columbia Language Project. It is based entirely on the Roman alphabet, but incorporates the symbol ⟨7⟩, which is used to represent a glottal stop.

The modern Secwépemc nations use the Bouchard system. Aside from the different symbols used, other differences exist between the two systems. Kuipers' system makes extensive use of automatic alternations; the letter ⟨n⟩ is sometimes pronounced [n], sometimes [ən], and sometimes [nə]. The choice of pronunciation is based on automatically applied rules, which the reader is expected to know.

The rules cover three classes of changes: (1) automatic darkening of vowels (Non-automatic darkening of vowels is covered under Phonological Processes.), (2) automatic alternation of sonorants between consonantal and vocalic pronunciation, and (3) alternation of plain velars, uvulars, and laryngeals with the corresponding rounded sounds.

=== Vowels ===
The Shuswap language has five full vowels, /a/, /e/, /i/, /o/, /u/, and one reduced vowel, /ə/.

Main phonetic values of the Shuswap vowels
	Front	Central	Back
Close	i ~ e ⟨i⟩		u ~ o ⟨u⟩
Mid	ɛ ⟨é⟩	ə ⟨e⟩	ɔ ⟨o⟩
Open		a ⟨a⟩	

Kuipers describes an additional vowel, /ʌ/, which is rare and often replaced by /e/ or /a/. Its description is ambiguous: its phonetic value is given as [ʌ], indicating a mid unrounded back vowel, but it is described in words as a mid central vowel.

There are restrictions on the distribution of vowels. The vowel /ə/ is restricted to unstressed syllables. The vowels /a/ and /o/ also occur in unstressed syllables, but only in a few words. Vowels /i/, /ɛ/ and /u/ are restricted to stressed syllables.

==== Automatic vowel darkening ====
The previous table shows the normal pronunciation of the vowels. Three of the full vowels, /e/, /i/, and /u/, are subject to an automatic process called darkening, which changes how these vowels are pronounced. Automatic darkening is predictable; it occurs before uvular obstruents and before or after uvularized sonorants. It is not reflected in spelling.

Vowel	Normal pronunciation	Darkened pronunciation
e	[ɛ]	[a]
i	[i ~ e]	[ɪ ~ ɛ]
u	[u ~ o]	[ɔ]

=== Consonants ===
Consonants are divided into two classes, obstruents (oral occlusives & voiceless continuants) and sonorants (nasal occlusives & voiced and glottalic continuants). The notation is approximately that of Ignace & Ignace (2017).

			Bilabial	Dental	Palatal (-alveolar)	Velar		Uvular/ Pharyngeal		Glottal
			Bilabial	Dental	Palatal (-alveolar)	plain	rounded	plain	rounded	Glottal
Occlusive	nasal	plain	m	n						
Occlusive	nasal	glottalic	mˀ ⟨m̓⟩	nˀ ⟨n̓⟩						
Occlusive	oral	tenuis	p	t	ts ~ tʃ ⟨ts⟩	k	kʷ ⟨kw⟩	q	qʷ ⟨qw⟩	
Occlusive	oral	ejective	pʼ ⟨p̓⟩	tɬʼ ⟨t̓⟩	tsʼ ~ tʃʼ ⟨t̓s⟩	kʼ ⟨k̓⟩	kʷʼ ⟨k̓w⟩	qʼ ⟨q̓⟩	qʷʼ ⟨q̓w⟩	ʔ ⟨7⟩
Continuant	voiceless			ɬ ⟨ll⟩	s ~ ʃ ⟨s⟩	x ⟨c⟩	xʷ ⟨cw⟩	χ ⟨x⟩	χʷ ⟨xw⟩	h
Continuant	voiced			l	j ⟨y⟩	ɰ ⟨r⟩	w	ʕ ⟨g⟩	ʕʷ ⟨gw⟩	
Continuant	glottalic			lˀ ⟨l̓⟩	jˀ ⟨y̓⟩	(ɰˀ) ⟨r̓⟩	wˀ ⟨w̓⟩	(ʕˀ) ⟨g̓⟩	ʕʷˀ ⟨g̓w⟩	

- Plain plosives are usually unaspirated, and can be voiced in some environments.
- The pronunciation of the dental-palatal obstruents ⟨ts, t̓s, s⟩ ranges from dental [ts, tsʼ, s] to palatal [tʃ, [tʃʼ, ʃ], although ⟨ts⟩ tends more towards the palatal pronunciation.
- The glottalized dental-lateral plosive ⟨t̓⟩ [tɬʼ] can also be pronounced as a glottalized dental plosive [tʼ].
- The sonorants are voiced. They can be consonantal or vocalic, though vocalic variants occur only in unstressed syllables.
- Consonantal forms of glottalized sonorants occur only after vowels.
- The glottalized plain velar and uvular sonorants [ɰˀ] and [ʕˀ] are rare. Where these sounds ought to occur due to phonological processes, what typically occurs instead is [ʔ] or [aʔ].

==== Consonantal-vocalic variation of sonorants ====
The variation of sonorants between consonantal and vocalic pronunciations is automatic, and not always indicated in the spelling system. The rule for determining this as follows:

- To start, all sonorants in a word are to be considered vocalic.
- Then, beginning from the right hand side of the word, a sonorant in any one of the following situations is changed to consonantal:

- a vowel on its right side;
- a vocalic sonorant on its right side; or
- a vowel on its left side.

Example 1: l [l], m [m] and m [əm] in variants of 'go ahead!' xílme [ˈχilmə] and xílmce [ˈχiləmxə]
Example 3: l [l] and r [əː] in 'waterfall' k̓wellr7ép [kʷʼəɬəːˈʔɛp]
Example 4: l [l], w [u], y [j] and n [ən] in 'I catch something in a trap' lélwyen-kn [ˈlɛlujəŋkən]

=== Writing system ===
The table below compares the Bouchard orthography used by the Shuswap Language Department with their equivalents in Kuipers' (1974) notation.

Nasals
Bouchard	Kuipers
m	m
m̓	m'
n	n
n̓	n'
Plosives
p	p
p̓	p'
t	t
t̓	t'
ts	c
ts̓	c'
k	k
kw	k°
k̓	k'
k̓w	k'°
q	q
qw	q°
q̓	q'
q̓w	q'°
7	ʔ
Fricatives
ll	λ
s	s
c	x
cw	x°
x	x̌
xw	x̌°
h	h
Approximants
l	l
l̓	l'
y	y
y̓	y'
r	ɣ
r̓	ɣ'
w	w
w̓	w'
g	ʕ
g̓	ʕ'
gw	ʕ°
g̓w	ʕ°'
Vowels
a	a
e	ə
é	e
i	i
o	o
u	u

The rest of this article uses the Kuipers alphabet.

=== Syllable structure ===
A Shuswap word consists of a stem, to which can be added various affixes. Very few words contain two roots. Any stressed root can have an unstressed alternative, where the vowel is replaced by [ə].

Most roots have the form CVC or CC (the latter only if unstressed). Other roots are CVCC or CCVC.

Suffixes begin either with a stressed vowel (dropped in forms where the root is stressed) or a consonant. Prefixes generally have the form C- or CC-.

=== Stress ===
Stress in Shuswap is not very prominent, and occurs only in longer words. Since [u], [ɛ] and [i] are always stressed and [ə] never is, stress is usually fairly simple to predict.

=== Phonological processes ===
Although Kuipers (1974) does not specify, in many cases the glottalized or rounded version of a consonant seems to represent an allophonic variation. For example, consonants which have a rounded form are rounded before and after [u]. However, glottalization can be contrastive (the root q'ey-, "set up a structure," versus q'ey'-, "write") or allophonic (the root q'ey- appears with a glottalized final consonant in s-t-q'ey'-qn, "shed"). Consonant reduplication can also have an effect on glottalization.

There are a number of ways in which sounds are affected by their environments. Resonants in the vocalic position are preceded by an automatic schwa, for example the word /stʼmkelt/ ("daughter"), pronounced [stɬʼəmkelt]. The darkening of vowels, as described below, is another case.

The distribution of vowels is quite complex. The vowels have the following main variants:

- i = [i~e]
- u = [u~o]
- o = [ɔ]
- e = [ɛ].

/a/ and /ʌ/ are unchanged. The environment around uvulars and velars produces a different set of variants, including occasional slight diphthongs. Additionally, some roots cause darkened vowels to appear in suffixes; one example is the suffix -ekst ("hand, arm"), which is darkened in x°əl'-akst. The darkened vowels are as follows:

- e = [a]
- u = [o]
- i = [e].

== Morphology ==
=== Affixes ===
Shuswap's affixation system is robust. A nominalizing prefix s- is used to derive nouns from verbs, and prefixes to indicate a resulting state are added to verbs. A sample of Shuswap's small number of prefixes is below:

- t'l'-: during a period in the past
- c- or s-: hither
- t- or tk-: on top of, on the outside
- wλ-: group of people
- ʔ-: second person singular possessive

Most nouns contain suffixes. Suffixes are also used to indicate transitive, intransitive, and imperative verbs. Below are a few examples taken from the extensive collection of Shuswap suffixes:

- /-eps/: back of neck
- /-tem'/: bottom, canyon, lowland
- /-itʃeʔ/: surface, hide
- /-esq't/: day
- /-eq/: berries
- /-el'txʷ/: a sheet-like object, skin, bark

=== Morphological processes ===
Shuswap makes extensive use of reduplication. Some examples of simple reduplication are:

- Initial reduplication: [s-tíq'm] (bitterroot) to [tətíq'm] (prepare bitterroots)
- Final reduplication: [puxʷ-m] (blow) to [pəxʷ'úxʷ] (swell up)
- Total reduplication: [piq] (white) to [pəq-'piq] (flour)
- Consonant reduplication

In addition, there are several types of complex reduplication, involving patterns such as 11V12, 112V23, and 1123V34 (where 1 represents C_{1}, etc.).

Not all types of reduplication are productive and functional. Total reduplication indicates plurality and consonant reduplication is diminutive, but most other reduplications are difficult to explain.

In addition to reduplication, root morphemes can be modified by interior glottalization, such that a root CVC appears as CʔVC. Although the process is not productive, many recorded forms refer to a state, for example pʔeɣ (cooled off) from peɣns (he cools it off). Consonant reduplication can proceed as usual with interior glottalization.

== Syntax ==
=== Word order ===
Word order in Shuswap is relatively free; syntactical relationships are easily conveyed by the case marking system. However, it is common but not necessary for the predicate to head the sentence.

Sentences with predicate first:

- wist ɣ-citx the house is high
- cut l-nx̌peʔe my grandfather said

Sentences with subject first (rare):

- ɣ-sq°yic m-cunsəs ɣx̌°ʕ°elmx Rabbit was told by fox

=== Case marking ===
Shuswap uses two cases: the absolutive, for the subject of an intransitive verb, the subject of a transitive verb, and the object of a transitive verb; and the relative, for all other cases (for example, the actor of a passive verb, or an adverb).

Absolutive Case:

- wist ɣ-citx the house is high
- m-tʔeyns ɣ-x̌°ʕ°elmx ɣ-sk'lep Fox met Coyote

Relative Case:

- wist t-citx° a high house
- m-cuntməs ɣ-sq°yic t-x̌°ʕ°elmx Rabbit was told by Fox (the subject is in the Absolutive)

=== Other forms ===
Nouns and verbs appear in four different forms, depending on their syntactic surroundings.

- The plain form: nouns and intransitive verbs, conjugated for person. Additionally, a distinction is made between object-centered and subject-centered words; compare l-m-wiwktn "the one I saw" with l-m-wiwkcms "the one that saw me."
- The suffixal form: for intransitive verbs, and also transitive verbs and nouns (third person singular only). This form is sometimes optional and sometimes obligatory. Examples of use include as an imperative substitute (xwislxəx° wl meʔ kicx-k, "run till you get there") and in "if" and "when" sentences (l-twiwtwn, "when I grew up").
- The nominalized form: for nouns and intransitive verbs. A nominalized intransitive verb refers to the goal object of the action, as in yʔen t'-sq°iʔq°e l-nstix°C'e l-pəxyewtəs "this is the groundhog I shot yesterday." Nominalization is also used in questions, either yes-or-no or introduced with "what".
- The ʔs- form: refers to a fact, with overtones of goal-directedness. For example: cuct-kn ʔnsʔiʔλn "I want to eat."

== Sample lexicon ==
The following is a list of roots (listed separately or as their simplest derivatives), and a selection of words derived from these roots by affixes.

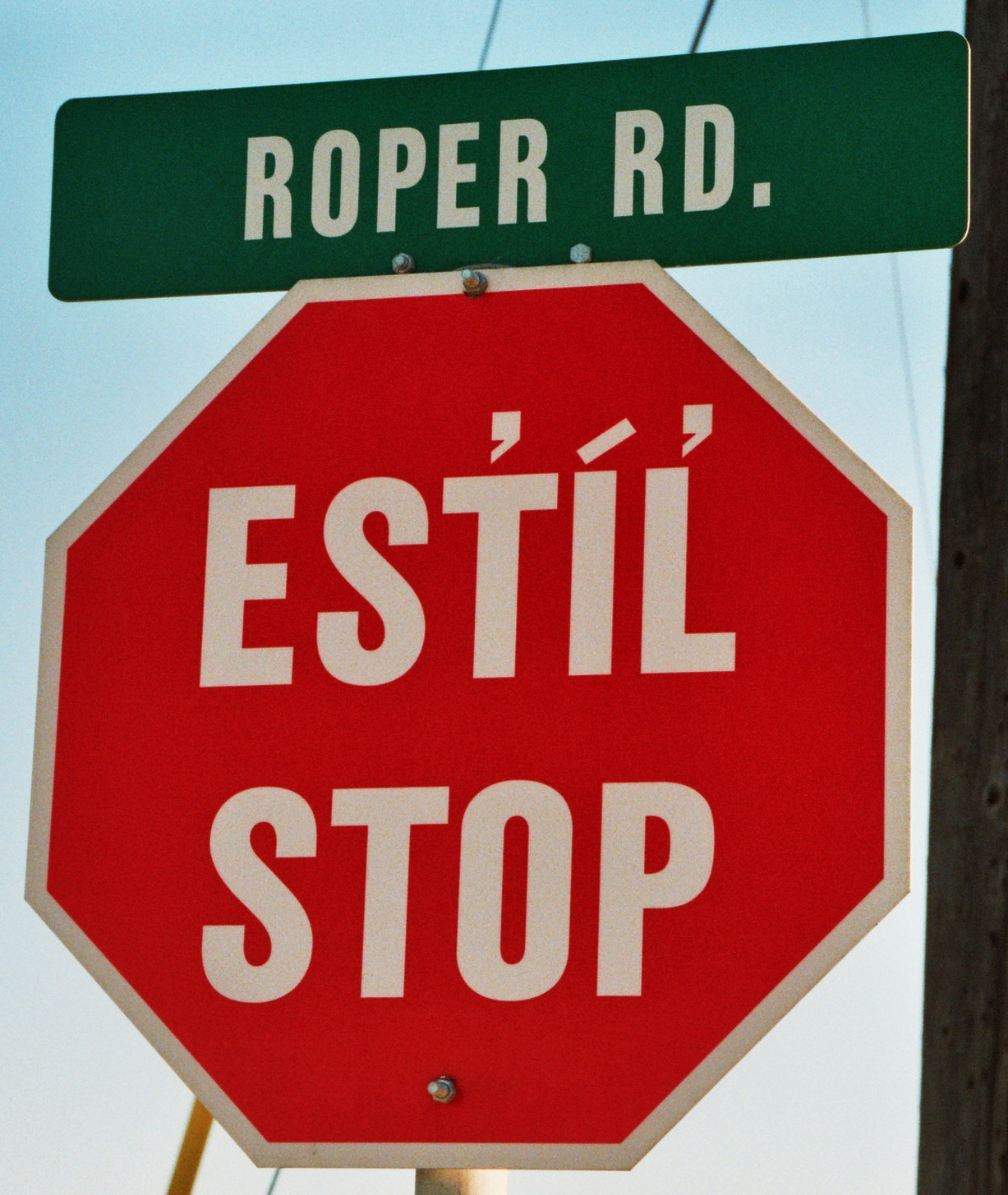
A stop sign in both English and Secwepemctsín (Shuswwap) on the Bonaparte/Stuctwesemc Reserve

Root	Derivative	Meaning
c-pet		spread out
	x-pət-min'	covering around something
	x-pət-cin'-tn	skin door-covering
ptek		pass by
	x-ptetk-tn	finish line
	x-ptək-ew's	to cross a road
tʔik°		fire
	tətʔiʔk°-m	to glow / be red hot
	tik°-n'k-tn	a fungus that was used in making fire
ciq°		red
	cəq°-cin-tn	lipstick
	cəq°-cq°eq°sxn'	penny
q°el		to speak, talk
	c-q°l-nt-es	to call, summon
	q°l-t-əmiʔ	talkative
yew		scoop up
	x-yew-m	to fetch water
	x-yew'-mn	fishing spot, bucket
s-q°ex-t		wild man, bugbear
	t-q°əx-q°əx-n't-es	to frighten people by spooky behavior
	q°ex-s-n-s	to tell somebody about mysterious sight or experience

=== Words borrowed into English ===
The word kokanee, a type of salmon, comes from Shuswap.
