= Little River =

Little River may refer to several places:

== Australia ==
=== Streams ===
==== New South Wales ====
- Little River (Dubbo), source in the Dubbo region, a tributary of the Macquarie River
- Little River (Oberon), source in the Oberon Shire, a tributary of Coxs River (Hawkesbury–Nepean catchment)
- Little River (Wingecarribee), source in the Wingecarribee Shire, a tributary of Burke River (Hawkesbury–Nepean catchment)
- Little River (Wollondilly), source in the Wollondilly Shire, a tributary of Nattai River (Hawkesbury–Nepean catchment)
- Boyd River (New South Wales), also known as Little River during the 19th century (Clarence River catchment)
- Goobarragandra River, a major tributary of Tumut River, was also known as Tumut Little River and sometimes Little River (Murrumbidgee catchment)
- Goodradigbee River, was also known as Little River and, until 1970, it was officially Goodradigbee (or Little) River (Murrumbidgee catchment)
- Mongarlowe River, also known as Little River, during the 19th century (Shoalhaven River catchment)

==== Victoria ====
- Little River (Avon, West Gippsland), in the Avon Wilderness Park
- Little River (Cathedral Range), in the Cathedral Range
- Little River (Greater Geelong), in the City of Greater Geelong
- Little River (Moroka River, Victoria), reaches its confluence with the Moroka River in the Alpine National Park
- Little River (Snowy River National Park), reaches its confluence in the Snowy River National Park
- Little River (Sydenham Inlet, East Gippsland), reaches its mouth at the Sydenham Inlet
- Little River (Tambo River, East Gippsland, Victoria), reaches its confluence with the Tambo River in East Gippsland
- Teal Creek, formerly known as the Little River, reaches its mouth at the Mallacoota Inlet

==== Queensland ====
- Little River, a tributary of the Gilbert River in Far North Queensland
- Little River, a tributary of the Hodgkinson River, in Far North Queensland. (part of the Mitchell River catchment)

==== Tasmania ====
- The Little River, a tributary of the Nive River (part of the River Derwent catchment)

=== Communities ===
- Little River, New South Wales, a locality in the valley of the Goobarragandra River, near Tumut
- Little River, Victoria, a township near Geelong

== Canada ==
=== Streams ===
- Little River (Cariboo River tributary), a river in the Cariboo region, British Columbia
- Little River (Little Shuswap Lake), a short connecting waterway in British Columbia, between Shuswap Lake and Little Shuswap Lake
- Little River (Vancouver Island), a stream in the Comox Valley region, in British Columbia
- Little River (Northern Peninsula, Newfoundland); see List of rivers of Newfoundland and Labrador

=== Communities ===
- Little River, British Columbia, in the Comox Valley area of Vancouver Island
- Little River, Cumberland County, Nova Scotia
- Little River, Digby, Nova Scotia
- Little River, Victoria County, Nova Scotia
- Little River Harbour, Nova Scotia, in Yarmouth County
- Little River, Yukon

== United States ==
=== Communities ===
- Little River, Baldwin County, Alabama
- Little River County, Arkansas
- Little River, California, Mendocino County
- Little River (Miami), a neighborhood within the city of Miami
- Little River, Kansas, Rice County
- Little River, South Carolina, Horry County
- Little River-Academy, Texas, Bell County
- Little River, Wisconsin, Oconto County

=== Streams ===
==== Arkansas ====
- Little River (St. Francis River tributary), a tributary of the St. Francis River
- Little River (Red River tributary), a tributary of the Red River

==== California ====
- Little River (Mendocino County), a river in Mendocino County
- Little River (Humboldt County), a river in Humboldt County

==== Florida ====
- Little River (Biscayne Bay), flowing into Biscayne Bay
- Little River (Ochlockonee River tributary), a tributary of the Ochlockonee River

==== Georgia ====
- Little River (Columbia County, Georgia), a tributary of the Savannah River
- Little River (Etowah River tributary), a tributary of the Etowah River
- Little River (Oconee River tributary), a tributary of the Oconee River
- Little River (Withlacoochee River tributary), a tributary of the Withlacoochee River (North)

==== Michigan ====
- Little River (Big Bay de Noc)
- Little River (Menominee River tributary), a tributary of the Menominee River

==== Missouri ====
- Little River (St. Francis River tributary), a tributary of the St. Francis River in southeastern Missouri and northeastern Arkansas

==== Virginia ====
- Little River (North Anna River tributary), in Hanover and Louisa counties
- Little River (Clinch River tributary), in Russell and Tazewell counties
- Little River (Goose Creek tributary), in Fauquier and Loudoun counties
- Little River (New River tributary), in Floyd, Montgomery, and Pulaski counties
- Little River (North River tributary), two streams that flow within the George Washington National Forest

==== Other streams in the United States ====
- Little River Canyon National Preserve, Alabama
- Little River (Shetucket River tributary), a tributary of the Shetucket River, Connecticut
- Little River (Delaware), flowing into Delaware Bay, Delaware
- Little River (Indiana), a tributary of the Wabash River, Indiana
- Little River (Kentucky), a tributary of the Cumberland River, Kentucky
- Little River (Louisiana), a tributary of the Ouachita River, Louisiana
- Little River (Maine), several rivers in Maine
- Little River (Saint Louis River), a tributary of the Saint Louis River, Minnesota
- Little River (Merrimack River tributary), a tributary of the Merrimack River, Massachusetts and New Hampshire
- Little River (New Hampshire), several rivers in New Hampshire
- Little River (Oregon), a list of rivers in Oregon
- Little River (Grass River tributary), a tributary of the Grass River, New York
- Little River (North Carolina), several rivers in North Carolina
- Little River (Oklahoma), a list of rivers in Oklahoma
- Little River (South Carolina), a list of rivers in South Carolina
- Little River (Tennessee), a tributary of the Tennessee River, Tennessee
- Little River (Texas), a tributary of the Brazos River, Texas

== Other communities ==
- Fiumicino (Italian for "Little River"), a town and comune near Rome, Italy
- Little River, Banks Peninsula, a town in the Canterbury region of New Zealand

== Other streams ==
- Little River (Grenada), a river in Grenada
- Little River (New Zealand), a river in New Zealand
- Little River (Somerset), a tributary of the River Barle, Somerset, England

== Other uses ==
- "Little River", a song by Strawberry Switchblade from Strawberry Switchblade
- Little River railway station, in Australia

== See also ==
- La Petite Rivière (disambiguation)
- Little River Township (disambiguation)
- Little River Railroad (disambiguation)
- Little Red River (disambiguation)
- Little River, Alabama (disambiguation)
- Rio Pequeno (disambiguation)
- Little River Station in Christchurch
