= List of shipwrecks in December 1851 =

The list of shipwrecks in December 1851 includes ships sunk, foundered, wrecked, grounded, or otherwise lost during December 1851.

== 1 December ==
List of shipwrecks: 1 December 1851
Ship	State	Description
Annie McNabb	(United Kingdom of Great Britain and Ireland) British North America	The ship was driven ashore in the Petite Passage.
Celino	Kingdom of the Two Sicilies	The ship sprang a leak and was abandoned in the English Channel 40 nautical miles (74 km) south of the Lizard Lighthouse, Cornwall, United Kingdom. Her crew were rescued by Africa (United Kingdom). Celino was on a voyage from Licata to Dunkirk, Nord, France.
Herald	(United Kingdom of Great Britain and Ireland) British North America	The ship was driven ashore and wrecked in the Petite Passage. She was on a voyage from Cornwallis, Nova Scotia to Boston, Massachusetts, United States.
Lady Hilda	United Kingdom	The ship ran aground at New Romney, Kent. She was on a voyage from Demerara, British Guiana to London. She was refloated.
Minerva	United Kingdom	The ship was driven ashore near Ostend, West Flanders, Belgium. She was on a voyage from Liverpool, Lancashire to Ostend.
Narcisse Marie	France	The brig was driven ashore between "Hyeen Island" and Landskrona, Sweden. She was on a voyage from Saint Petersburg, Russia to Bordeaux, Gironde. She was refloated and towed in to Helsingør, Denmark.
Princess Royal	United Kingdom	The schooner ran aground at New Romney. She was refloated.
Saucy Jack	United Kingdom	The smack ran aground and was wrecked on the Kimmeridge Ledges, in the English Channel off the coast of Dorset. She was on a voyage from Brixham, Devon to Hull, Yorkshire.
Success	United Kingdom	The sloop was holed by an anchor and sank at Aberdyfi, Merionethshire. She was on a voyage from Newport, Monmouthshire to Aberdyfi

== 2 December ==
List of shipwrecks: 2 December 1851
Ship	State	Description
Countess of Mayo	United Kingdom	The vessel was driven onshore and wrecked at Macquarie Island in a heavy swell. All hands were saved by the whaling barque Lord Duncan (United Kingdom).
Hermann	Sweden	The ship ran aground south east of Bornholm, Denmark. She was on a voyage from Stockholm to Ystad.
Lilla	United Kingdom	The schooner was abandoned in the Atlantic Ocean (43°35′N 41°50′W). All eleven people on board were rescued by Susan (United Kingdom) and she was set afire. Lilla was on a voyage from Wilmington, North Carolina, United States to Liverpool, Lancashire.
President	United Kingdom	The ship was abandoned in the Atlantic Ocean. Her crew were rescued by Harlequin (United Kingdom).

== 3 December ==
List of shipwrecks: 3 December 1851
Ship	State	Description
Active	Sweden	The ship was wrecked near the mouth of the Daugava. Her crew were rescued.
Archimedes	Hamburg	The steamship was driven ashore on Neuwerk. She was refloated and taken in to Hamburg, where she arrived on 5 December.
Frederick and Lykka	Sweden	The ship was wrecked on the east coast of Öland. She was on a voyage from Rostock to Visby.
Gluckauf	Flag unknown	The ship was driven ashore and wrecked at Kunda, Russia.
Lydia	United Kingdom	The ship was driven ashore at the mouth of the Pregolya River. She was on a voyage from Königsberg to Pillau, Prussia and an English port. She was refloated and towed in to Holstein, Prussia.
Maria	Duchy of Holstein	The ship sprang a leak and was beached at "Porto Botto", Sardinia. Her crew were rescued. She was on a voyage from Barcelona, Spain to Cette, Hérault, France.
Perseverance	France	The schooner was driven ashore and wrecked at Reval, Russia. Her crew were rescued. She was on a voyage from Rouen, Seine-Inférieure to Saint Petersburg, Russia.
Snekkan	Flag unknown	The ship was driven ashore and wrecked at Kunda.

== 4 December ==
List of shipwrecks: 4 December 1851
Ship	State	Description
Coralie	France	The full-rigged ship ran aground on the English Bank, in the River Plate. She was on a voyage from Pasages, Spain to Buenos Aires, Argentina. She had been refloated by 21 February 1852 and taken in to Montevideo, Uruguay. Also reported as occurring on 14 December.
Deben	United Kingdom	The ship ran aground and was severely damaged in the River Nene. She was on a voyage from Newcastle upon Tyne, Northumberland to Wisbech, Cambridgeshire.
Isabella	United Kingdom	The ship was wrecked off the mouth of the Rio Grande.
Margaretha Everarda	Russia	The ship was wrecked near Harboøre, Denmark. Her crew were rescued. She was on a voyage from Vyborg to Hull, Yorkshire, United Kingdom. She had broken up by 11 December.
Meta	Danzig	The ship was driven ashore near Neufähr, Prussia. Her crew were rescued.
Sophia	Hamburg	The ship was in collision with the steamship Princess Royal and was abandoned in the North Sea off the coast of Lincolnshire, United Kingdom. Her crew were rescued. She was on a voyage from Saint Petersburg, Russia to King's Lynn, Norfolk, United Kingdom.
West Indian	United Kingdom	The ship was driven ashore in Algoa Bay. All on board were rescued. She was on a voyage from the Cape of Good Hope, Cape Colony to London. She broke up on 7 December.

== 5 December ==
List of shipwrecks: 5 December 1851
Ship	State	Description
Columbus	Kingdom of Hanover	The ship was wrecked on the Harold Rock, in the River Shannon. She was on a voyage from Odesa, Russia to Limerick, United Kingdom.
Eendraght	Sweden	The ship ran aground of the Fredericksort Reef, in the Baltic Sea off the coast of Prussia. She was on a voyage from Stockholm to an English port. She was refloated on 7 December and taken in to the Holtenau Canal.
Emelie and Lucie	Bremen	The ship was lost off Jérémie, Haiti. Her crew were rescued. She was on a voyage from Port-au-Prince, Haiti to Bremen.
Matador	United Kingdom	The ship ran aground on the Leman Sand, in the North Sea. She was on a voyage from Newcastle upon Tyne, Northumberland to Gibraltar. She was refloated on 6 December and put in to Lowestoft, Suffolk in a leaky condition.
Margaret Rait	United Kingdom	The brig ran aground between Benbecula and South Uist, Orkney Islands. Her crew were rescued. She was on a voyage from Quebec City, Province of Canada, British North America to Greensbay, Yorkshire.
Ottawa	United Kingdom	The ship was abandoned in the Atlantic Ocean (42°15′N 53°00′W). Her crew were rescued. She was on a voyage from Saint John, New Brunswick, British North America to Waterford.
Paragon	United Kingdom	The ship ran aground at King's Lynn, Norfolk. She was on a voyage from Saint Petersburg, Russia to King's Lynn.
Perseverance	France	The schooner was driven ashore and wrecked at Reval, Russia. Her crew were rescued. She was on a voyage from Rouen, Seine-Inférieure to Saint Petersburg.
Prompt	United Kingdom	The ship was driven ashore at Great Yarmouth, Norfolk. She was on a voyage from Memel, Prussia to Great Yarmouth.
Shakespear	United Kingdom	The ship was sighted in the Bay of Bengal whilst on a voyage from Calcutta, India to an English port. No further trace, presumed foundered with the loss of all hands.
Stephany	Sweden	The ship ran aground off Melluži, Russia. Her crew were rescued. She was on a voyage from Stockholm to Riga, Russia.

== 6 December ==
List of shipwrecks: 6 December 1851
Ship	State	Description
Arethusa	Prussia	The ship was driven ashore south of the Nakkehead Lighthouse, Denmark with the loss of two of her crew. She was on a voyage from London, United Kingdom to Memel. She was refloated the next day and taken in to Helsingør, Denmark.
Borussia	Prussia	The ship was driven ashore south of the Nakkehead Lighthouse. She was on a voyage from Dublin, United Kingdom to Memel. She was refloated on 19 December and towed in to Helsingør.
Columbus	(Russian Empire) Grand Duchy of Finland	The ship ran aground and was wrecked on the Harold Rock, off the coast of County Limerick, United Kingdom. She was on a voyage from Odesa to Raahe.
Effort	United Kingdom	The sloop ran aground in the River Dee downstream of Connah's Quay, Flintshire. She was on a voyage from Cardiff, Glamorgan to Chester, Cheshire. She was refloated but drove ashore and sank. Effort was refloated on 26 December.
Eliza Ann	United Kingdom	The ship was driven ashore and wrecked at Riga, Russia. Her crew were rescued. She was on a voyage from Riga to an English port
Fortuna	Stettin	The ship was damaged in the English Channel by an explosion in her cargo of coal, which killed two of her crew. She consequently put in to Ramsgate, Kent, United Kingdom. She was on a voyage from Cardiff, Glamorgan, United Kingdom to Bremen.
Minerva	United Kingdom	The brig was driven ashore at Caister-on-Sea, Norfolk.
Queen of the Isles	(United Kingdom of Great Britain and Ireland) British North America	The brig was driven ashore at Holyrood, Newfoundland. She was on a voyage from Saint John's, Newfoundland to Sydney, Nova Scotia.
Sophia	Sweden	The ship ran aground off Gotland and consequently put in to Ystad in a leaky condition.
Vanderbuilt	United States	The steamboat ran aground in the Hudson River at New York.

== 7 December ==
List of shipwrecks: 7 December 1851
Ship	State	Description
Bee	United Kingdom	The sloop was driven ashore in the Larne Lough. She was on a voyage from Larne to Belfast, County Antrim.
Dibdin	United Kingdom	The ship was abandoned and sank in the Atlantic Ocean with the loss of three of her crew. Survivors were rescued by Lady Bulwer (United Kingdom). Dibdin was on a voyage from New York, United States to Liverpool, Lancashire.
Economy	United Kingdom	The sloop sank off Grantown-on-Spey, Morayshire. Her crew were rescued.
Helen	United Kingdom	The ship was driven ashore and scuttled at Lamlash, Isle of Arran.
Laurel	United Kingdom	The sloop sank off Skateraw, Kincardineshire. Her crew were rescued. She was on a voyage from the River Spey to Newcastle upon Tyne, Northumberland.
Lucie	Belgium	The ship departed from Batavia, Netherlands East Indies for Amsterdam, North Holland. No further trace, presumed foundered with the loss of all hands.
Martha	United Kingdom	The ship was driven ashore at Maryport, Cumberland. She was on a voyage from Quebec City, Province of Canada, British North America to Maryport. She was refloated on 22 December and taken in to Maryport.
Plenty	United Kingdom	The brig ran aground on the Mouse Sand, in the Thames Estuary whilst avoiding a collision with another brig. She was later refloated.
Spring	United Kingdom	The brig was in collision with the barque Canada (United Kingdom) and sank in the North Sea off Huntcliff, Yorkshire with the loss of all hands.
Stornoway	United Kingdom	The ship ran aground off Deal, Kent. She was on a voyage from London to Bombay, India and China.

== 8 December ==
List of shipwrecks: 8 December 1851
Ship	State	Description
Alexander	United Kingdom	The ship was driven ashore at Dunbar, Lothian. Her crew were rescued. She was on a voyage from South Shields, County Durham to Alloa, Clackmannanshire. She subsequently caught fire and was burnt out. The wreck subsequently floated off in a waterlogged condition.
Alpha	United Kingdom	The ship was driven ashore at Dunbar. Her crew were rescued. She was on a voyage from the River Tay to Leith, Lothian.
Aurelia	United Kingdom	The ship was wrecked on the Niding Rock, in the Baltic Sea off Gothenburg, Sweden. Her crew were rescued. She was on a voyage from Riga, Russia to London.
Ballot	United Kingdom	The ship was driven ashore at Dunbar. Her crew were rescued. She was on a voyage from Hull, Yorkshire to the Clyde. She was refloated on 10 December and taken in to Dunbar.
Daniel	Flag unknown	The sloop was driven ashore near Memel, Prussia. Her crew were rescued. She was on a voyage from Stettin to Danzig.
Earl of North Esk	United Kingdom	The ship was driven ashore at Dunbar. Her crew were rescued. She was on a voyage from South Shields to Alloa. She subsequently floated off and sank.
Effort	United Kingdom	The sloop sank at Chester, Cheshire.
Eliza	United Kingdom	The ship was driven ashore near Larne, County Antrim.
Elize	Hamburg	The ship was driven ashore on Skagen, Denmark. She was on a voyage from Hamburg to Fredrikshavn, Denmark. She had become a wreck by 12 December.
Hallyards	United Kingdom	The ship was driven ashore at Greenock, Renfrewshire. She was on a voyage from Demerara, British Honduras to Greenock.
Irene	United Kingdom	The ship ran aground on the Newcombe Sand, in the North Sea off the coast of Suffolk. She was on a voyage from Newcastle upon Tyne, Northumberland to Jersey, Channel Islands. She was refloated and taken in to Lowestoft, Suffolk.
Isabella	United Kingdom	The ship fan aground and capsized at Donegal. She was on a voyage from Liverpool, Lancashire to Donegal.
Jane Watson	United Kingdom	The ship was driven ashore and damaged at Kingstown, County Dublin. She was on a voyage from Quebec City, Province of Canada, British North America to Kingstown. She was refloated.
Johanna Frederike	Danzig	The ship struck a rock in Loch Bay and was abandoned by her crew. She was on a voyage from Liverpool to Danzig.
John	United Kingdom	The brig ran aground on the Thorpeness Reef, in the North Sea off the coast of Suffolk and was wrecked. Her crew were rescued. She was on a voyage from Newcastle upon Tyne, Northumberland to London.
Laurel	United Kingdom	The sloop was run ashore at the mouth of the River Spey.
Marianne	Netherlands	The ship was driven ashore at Dunbar. Her crew were rescued. She was on a voyage from Rotterdam, South Holland to the Clyde. She had been refloated by 10 December.
Mary Hardy	United Kingdom	The sloop was driven ashore and wrecked at Muasdale, Argyllshire. Her crew were rescued.
Patriot	United Kingdom	The ship was driven ashore on Holy Isle, in the Firth of Clyde. She was on a voyage from Larne, County Antrim to Irvine, Ayrshire.
Peruvian	(United Kingdom of Great Britain and Ireland) British North America	The ship was driven ashore at Helensburgh, Renfrewshire. She was refloated on 10 December.
Rhind	United Kingdom	The schooner was wrecked on the Lady Rock, off the coast of Argyllshire. Her crew were rescued.
Robert Bradford	United Kingdom	The barque was driven ashore and wrecked at Porth Dafarch, Anglesey with the loss of twelve of her twenty crew. She was on a voyage from Calcutta, India to Liverpool, Lancashire.
St. Lawrence	United Kingdom	The ship was driven ashore at Corran, Argyllshire. She was on a voyage from Moville, County Donegal to Glasgow, Renfrewshire.
St. Paul	United States	The ship was driven ashore on Masbate Island, Spanish East Indies. She was on a voyage from Salem, Massachusetts to Manila, Spanish East Indies.
Susan	United Kingdom	The ship was driven ashore.
Violante	Malta	The brig was driven ashore near Algeciras, Spain. She was on a voyage from Malta to Falmouth, Cornwall or Queenstown, County Cork. She was later refloated and taken in to Gibraltar.
Vivid	United Kingdom	The sloop was driven ashore at Lindisfarne, Northumberland. She was later refloated.
William Clewes	United Kingdom	The ship was driven ashore near North Berwick, East Lothian. She was on a voyage from South Shields to Alloa.

== 9 December ==
List of shipwrecks: 9 December 1851
Ship	State	Description
Aberdeen	United Kingdom	The ship was driven ashore and severely damaged at Kamouraska, Province of Canada, British North America.
Agenoria	(United Kingdom of Great Britain and Ireland) Jersey	The schooner was driven ashore near Folkestone, Kent. She was refloated and taken in to The Downs.
Ben Nevis	United Kingdom	The ship was wrecked in Bally David Creek, County Kerry. Her crew were rescued. She was on a voyage from Quebec City, Province of Canada, British North America to Bristol, Gloucestershire.
Faugh-a-Ballagh	United Kingdom	The ship was driven ashore at Deal, Kent. She was on a voyage from Smyrna, Ottoman Empire to Leith, Lothian. She was refloated and taken in to Ramsgate, Kent in a leaky condition.
Frithiof	Sweden	The schooner ran ashore and was wrecked near Brook, Isle of Wight, United Kingdom. Her crew were rescued. She was on a voyage from Lisbon, Portugal to Hamburg.
Ottawa	(United Kingdom of Great Britain and Ireland) British North America	The ship was driven ashore in the Clyde near Port Glasgow, Renfrewshire.
Patrick Henry	United Kingdom	The ship was driven ashore at Deal. She was refloated and taken in to Ramsgate in a leaky condition.

== 10 December ==
List of shipwrecks: 10 December 1851
Ship	State	Description
Active	United Kingdom	The ship was driven ashore at Wells-next-the-Sea, Norfolk. She was refloated on 12 December.
Camoena	United Kingdom	The ship ran aground on the Kentish Knock. She was on a voyage from Jamaica to London. She was refloated and taken in to The Downs in a leaky condition.
Canning	United Kingdom	The ship ran aground off Læsø, Denmark. She was on a voyage from South Shields, County Durham to Kalundborg, Denmark.
Courier	France	The ship was sighted in distress whilst on a voyage from Mauritius to Havre de Grâce, Seine-Inférieure. She was trying to put back to Mauritius. No further trace, presumed foundered with the loss of all hands.
Ebenezer	United Kingdom	The ship capsized and sank in a squall off Carlingford, County Louth with the loss of all hands. She was on a voyage from Dundalk, County Louth to Preston, Lancashire.
Ebenezer	United Kingdom	The ship ran aground on the Arklow Bank, in the Irish Sea off the coast of County Wicklow and was abandoned by her crew.
Mary Ridley	United Kingdom	The ship struck the Morro Reef and was damaged. She was on a voyage from St. Jago de Cuba, Cuba to Swansea, Glamorgan. She put back to St. Jago de Cuba and was beached. She was consequently condemned.
Prince of Wales	United Kingdom	The ship was driven ashore at the Rammekins Castle, Zeeland, Netherlands. She was on a voyage from Antwerp, Belgium to Hamburg. She was refloated and taken in to Vlissingen, Zeeland.
Romulus	United Kingdom	The ship departed from Brăila, Ottoman Empire for Cork or Falmouth, Cornwall. Believed subsequently foundered in the Black Sea as she did not pass Constantinople, Ottoman Empire.
Nestoria	United Kingdom	The ship was driven ashore in Rothesay Bay. She was on a voyage From Smyrna, Ottoman Empire to the Clyde. She was refloated on 13 December.
Watchful	United Kingdom	The ship ran aground at Hull, Yorkshire.

== 11 December ==
List of shipwrecks: 11 December 1851
Ship	State	Description
Adelaide	United States	The schooner was abandoned in the Atlantic Ocean. Her four crew were rescued by South Carolina (United States).
James Carmichael	United Kingdom	The ship was abandoned in the Mediterranean Sea 60 nautical miles (110 km) east south east of Malta. Her crew were rescued by Concordia (Russia). James Carmichael was on a voyage from Galaţi, Ottoman Empire to Falmouth, Cornwall or Queenstown, County Cork.
St. Lawrence	United Kingdom	The ship was driven ashore in West Loch Tarbert.

== 12 December ==
List of shipwrecks: 12 December 1851
Ship	State	Description
Annechina	Netherlands	The ship ran aground off Colt Island, County Dublin, United Kingdom. She was on a voyage from Liverpool, Lancashire to Schiedam, South Holland. She was refloated the next day and taken in to Skerries, County Dublin.
Storms	United Kingdom	The brig was abandoned in the North Sea 30 nautical miles (56 km) off the Farne Islands, Northumberland. Her crew were rescued. She was on a voyage from Hamburg to London.
Union	Prussia	The schooner was driven ashore on Rügen. She was on a voyage from Hull, Yorkshire, United Kingdom to Stralsund. She was refloated on 14 December and towed in to Stralsund.

== 13 December ==
List of shipwrecks: 13 December 1851
Ship	State	Description
Annechina	Netherlands	The ship was driven ashore on Colt Island, County Dublin, United Kingdom.
Chili	United Kingdom	The ship was wrecked on the Maplin Sands, in the North Sea off the coast of Essex.
Themis	(United Kingdom of Great Britain and Ireland) British North America	The ship was driven ashore in Brigantine Bay, Bahamas. She was on a voyage from Jamaica to Ragged Island, Bahamas. She was later refloated and taken in to Nassau, Bahamas.
Truxillo	United States	The ship was wrecked on the Two Sisters. Her crew were rescued. She was on a voyage from Saint John, New Brunswick, British North America to Eastport, Maine.

== 14 December ==
List of shipwrecks: 14 December 1851
Ship	State	Description
Bloomer	(United Kingdom of Great Britain and Ireland) British North America	The brigantine was driven ashore on "Jersey Island", Nova Scotia. She was on a voyage from Charlottetown, Prince Edward Island to New York, United States. She had become a wreck by 22 December.
Jane	United Kingdom	The ship was beached at Wick, Caithness.
Lalla	United Kingdom	The ship ran aground on the Horse Bank, in the Irish Sea off the coast of Lancashire. She was on a voyage from either Ramsey, Isle of Man, or Panama City, Republic of New Granada to Liverpool, Lancashire. She was refloated the next day and taken in to Liverpool.
Marie and Emilie	Belgium	The ship ran aground and was damaged on the Goodwin Sands, Kent, United Kingdom. She was on a voyage from Antwerp to New York, United States. She was refloated and taken in to Ramsgate Kent.
Perseverance	United Kingdom	The ship sprang a leak and was beached at Donna Nook, Lincolnshire. She was on a voyage from Sunderland, County Durham to Woodbridge, Suffolk. She was refloated on 16 December and was towed in to Grimsby, Lincolnshire.
Zebra	(United Kingdom of Great Britain and Ireland) Jersey	The cutter was driven ashore near Elizabeth Castle, Saint Helier and sank. All on board were rescued. She was on a voyage from Plymouth, Devon to Saint Helier.

== 15 December ==
List of shipwrecks: 15 December 1851
Ship	State	Description
Bridget	Belgium	The brig was driven ashore at Dungeness, Kent, United Kingdom. She was on a voyage from Antwerp to Liverpool, Lancashire, United States. Bridget was refloated the next day and taken in to Dover, Kent.
Castilian Maid	United Kingdom	The ship was driven ashore at Rattray Head, Aberdeenshire. She was on a voyage from Arklow, County Wicklow to Newcastle upon Tyne, Northumberland.
Clermont	United States	The steamship sank in the White River with the loss of 23 lives.
Eliza	United Kingdom	The barque ran aground and was damaged on the Haisborough Sands, in the North Sea off the coast of Norfolk. She was on a voyage from Seaham, County Durham to London. She was refloated.
Frantz	Prussia	The ship was driven ashore at Torekov, Sweden. She was on a voyage from Middlesbrough, Yorkshire, United Kingdom to Rostock.
Hellas	Greece	The brig ran aground and capsized at Cardiff, Glamorgan, United Kingdom.
Iris	(United Kingdom of Great Britain and Ireland) British North America	The ship was wrecked on the Half-Moon Rock, off Shelburne, Nova Scotia. Her crew were rescued. She was on a voyage from Saint Thomas, Virgin Islands to Halifax, Nova Scotia.
Jedore	(United Kingdom of Great Britain and Ireland) British North America	The ship was wrecked on Goose Island. Her crew were rescued. She was on a voyage from Halifax to Sydney, Nova Scotia.

== 16 December ==
List of shipwrecks: 16 December 1851
Ship	State	Description
Arcadian	(United Kingdom of Great Britain and Ireland) British North America	The ship was abandoned in the Atlantic Ocean. Her crew were rescued by General Dunlop (United States). Arcadian was on a voyage from "Bedique" to New York.
Eliza Ann	United Kingdom	The ship was driven ashore and wrecked near Riga, Russia. Her crew were rescued.
Patriot	(Denmark) Duchy of Schleswig	The ship was driven ashore north of Rønne, Denmark. Her crew were rescued. She was on a voyage from Bergen Norway to Königsberg, Prussia.

== 17 December ==
List of shipwrecks: 17 December 1851
Ship	State	Description
Elizabeth Hughes	United Kingdom	The ship collided with Mimer (Sweden) and sank in the English Channel off Dodman Point, Cornwall with the loss of a crew member. Survivors were rescued by Mimer. Elizabeth Hughes was on a voyage from Cardiff, Glamorgan to London.
Fawn	United States	The ship was driven ashore south of New York.
Myrtle	(United Kingdom of Great Britain and Ireland) British North America	The schooner was in collision with the full-rigged ship Britannia (United Kingdom) and was abandoned in the Atlantic Ocean. Her crew were rescued by Britannia. Myrtle was on a voyage from Saint John, New Brunswick to Antigua.
Platina	United States	The ship was driven ashore south of New York. She was on a voyage from Belize City, British Honduras to New York.
Porgy	(United Kingdom of Great Britain and Ireland) Barbados	The schooner capsized in a squall. Her crew were rescued. She was on a voyage from Dominica to Barbados.
Theodora en Sara	Netherlands	The barque collided with Corinthian (United Kingdom) and sank in the English Channel between Start Point, Devon and the Eddystone Rock. Her crew were rescued by Corinthian. Theodora en Sara was on a voyage from Batavia, Netherlands East Indies to Amsterdam, North Holland.
Trial	(United Kingdom of Great Britain and Ireland) British North America	The ship was driven ashore at Little River, Nova Scotia. (Note: There are several coastal settlements in Nova Scotia called Little River: Little River, Digby; Little River, Victoria County; and Little River Harbour. It is unclear at which one the wreck occurred.)
Waterlily	United Kingdom	The ship departed from Saint John's, Newfoundland, British North America for Zakynthos, Greece. No further trace, presumed foundered with the loss of all hands.

== 18 December ==
List of shipwrecks: 18 December 1851
Ship	State	Description
Belle Kate	United Kingdom	The barque ran aground at Dublin. She was on a voyage from Magaguadavic, New Brunswick, British North America to Dublin. She was refloated the next day and towed in to Dublin.
Omnibus	France	The ship was wrecked near Calais. Her crew were rescued. She was on a voyage from Nantes, Loire-Inférieure to Dunkirk, Nord.
Primrose	United Kingdom	The schooner was driven ashore at Great Yarmouth, Norfolk. She was on a voyage from London to Seaham, County Durham.
Ranger	United Kingdom	The schooner was in collision with Challenger (United Kingdom) in Liverpool Bay and was abandoned by her crew, who were rescued by Challenger. Ranger was on a voyage from Exeter, Devon to Liverpool, Lancashire. She was reboarded the next day and taken in to Liverpool.
Typhis	France	The ship ran aground on the Lemon and Ower Sand, in the North Sea. She was on a voyage from Sunderland, County Durham, United Kingdom to Bordeaux, Gironde. She was refloated and put in to Yorkshire in a leaky condition.

== 19 December ==
List of shipwrecks: 19 December 1851
Ship	State	Description
Caledonia	United Kingdom	The ship ran aground on the Barnard Sand, in the North Sea off the coast of Suffolk. She was on a voyage from Sunderland, County Durham to Rochester, Kent. She was refloated and put in to Lowestoft, Suffolk in a leaky condition.
Concordia	United Kingdom	The steamship ran aground whilst on a voyage from London to Rotterdam, South Holland, Netherlands. She was refloated and resumed her voyage
Ellen Murray	(United Kingdom of Great Britain and Ireland) Jersey	The ship ran aground on the Long Sand, in the North Sea off the coast of Essex. She was on a voyage from Hartlepool, County Durham to Saint-Servan, Ille-et-Vilaine, France. She was refloated and assisted in to Harwich, Essex in a leaky condition.
Governor McDonald	United Kingdom	The ship was driven ashore at Dungeness, Kent. She was on a voyage from London to the Gambia River. She was refloated.
Harmonia	United Kingdom	The steamship ran aground on the Holm Sand, in the North Sea off the coast of Lincolnshire. She was on a voyage from Hull, Yorkshire to Hamburg. She was refloated and put back to Hull.
Idia, or Selia	Kingdom of Sardinia	The barque was driven ashore at Alnmouth, Northumberland, United Kingdom. She was on a voyage from Rotterdam, South Holland, Netherlands to Newcastle upon Tyne, Northumberland. She was refloated.
John Williams	United Kingdom	The ship was driven ashore at Eyemouth, Berwickshire. She was refloated.
Mill Hall	United Kingdom	The brig was in collision with the steamship Perth (United Kingdom) and was abandoned off the Newarp Lightship ( Trinity House ). Her crew took to the longboat were rescued by a fishing smack. Mill Hall was on a voyage from London to Seaton Sluice, County Durham.
Wear	United Kingdom	The ship ran aground on the Scroby Sands, Norfolk. She was on a voyage from South Shields, County Durham, to London. She was refloated on 22 December and taken in to Great Yarmouth, Norfolk in a severely leaky condition.

== 20 December ==
List of shipwrecks: 20 December 1851
Ship	State	Description
Anne	United Kingdom	The barque ran aground on the Holmsand, in the Humber.
Aurora	Portugal	The schooner ran aground off Pinghai, Korea and was abandoned by her crew. She was on a voyage from Shanghai to Macao, China. She was plundered by the local inhabitants.
Glocester	United States	The sloop collided with the barque Triumph (United Kingdom) and sank off the east coast of the United States.
Hope	United Kingdom	The brig was driven ashore at Grimsby, Lincolnshire.
Margaret Ann	(flag) United States	The ship was driven ashore in the Hudson River. She was on a voyage from New York to San Juan de Nicaragua, Nicaragua. She was refloated and towed in to New York, where she arrived on 23 December.
Paragon	United Kingdom	The ship was lost at Wam Squeak Point, near Prospect Harbour. Her crew were rescued. She was on a voyage from Halifax, Nova Scotia to St. Stephen's, Newfoundland, British North America.
Rose and Ellen	United Kingdom	The ship was driven ashore near Holyhead, Anglesey. Her crew were rescued. She was on a voyage from Newport, Monmouthshire to Liverpool, Lancashire.
Tamarac	United Kingdom	The ship ran aground on the wreck of Vesta (United Kingdom) off the mouth of the Humber and was damaged. She was on a voyage from New Orleans, Louisiana, United States to Hull, Yorkshire. She arrived at Hull in a leaky condition.
Tidy	United Kingdom	The ship ran aground off Helsingør, Denmark. She was on a voyage from Rostock to London. She was refloated the next day.

== 21 December ==
List of shipwrecks: 21 December 1851
Ship	State	Description
Caroline	United Kingdom	The ship was driven ashore at "Charlbro'", Devon. She was on a voyage from Jersey, Channel Islands to Exeter, Devon.
Fame	United Kingdom	The ship was wrecked at the mouth of the Romain River, British Honduras.
Margery	United Kingdom	The schooner was abandoned in the Mediterranean Sea. Her crew were rescued. She was on a voyage from Middlesbrough, Yorkshire to Genoa, Kingdom of Sardinia.
Mary Irvine	United States	The ship ran aground on the Anegada Shoals and sank. Her crew were rescued. She was on a voyage from Antwerp, Belgium to Boston, Massachusetts.
Navigateur	France	The ship was wrecked at Point Galata, Ottoman Empire. She was on a voyage from Taganrog, Russia to an English port.
St. Andrew	United Kingdom	The sloop was driven ashore at Hartlepool, County Durham. She was on a voyage from Whitby, Yorkshire to Seaham, County Durham. She was refloated the next day and taken in to Hartlepool.
Wilson	United Kingdom	The sloop was run down and sunk in the North Sea 7 nautical miles (13 km) off the Cromer Lighthouse, Norfolk by the brig Six. Wilson was on a voyage from Goole, Yorkshire to London.

== 22 December ==
List of shipwrecks: 22 December 1851
Ship	State	Description
Britannia	United Kingdom	The ship ran aground on the Cork Sand, in the North Sea off the coast of Suffolk. She was on a voyage from Hartlepool, County Durham to London.
Clausina	United Kingdom	The ship was wrecked in the Gut of Canso. She was on a voyage from Port Wallace, Nova Scotia, British North America to London.
Fowler	United Kingdom	The ship was driven ashore near Tralee, County Kerry. She was on a voyage from Tralee to Bristol, Gloucestershire or Gloucester.
John, or John Riga	United Kingdom	The barque was driven ashore in the Hog Island Inlet. She was on a voyage from Galway to New York, United States.
Liverpool	United Kingdom	The ship foundered in the Atlantic Ocean. Her crew were rescued by Element (United States). Liverpool was on a voyage from Coquimbo, Chile to Cork.
Trientje	Kingdom of Hanover	The schooner foundered in the North Sea off Sylt, Duchy of Holstein. Her crew were rescued. She was on a voyage from Leith, Lothian, United Kingdom to Hamburg.
Tweelingen	Netherlands	The ship departed from Portsmouth, Hampshire, United Kingdom for Lisbon, Portugal. No further trace, presumed foundered with the loss of all hands.

== 23 December ==
List of shipwrecks: 23 December 1851
Ship	State	Description
Independence	United States	The ship was driven ashore at "Jersey Beach", near the Shark River Inlet. All on board were rescued. She was on a voyage from Belfast, County Antrim, United Kingdom. She broke up on 7 January 1852.
Ingrid Catherina	Sweden	The ship was wrecked on the Domsters Reef. She was on a voyage from Gothenburg to Ystad.
Scotia	United Kingdom	The brig was wrecked at Boston, Massachusetts, United States. She was on a voyage from Bonaire to Boston.
St. David	United Kingdom	The tug collided with the steamship Severn (United Kingdom) and sank in the River Avon.
Tricker	United Kingdom	The brig sprang a leak and sank in the Bristol Channel off Penarth, Glamorgan. She was on a voyage from Newport, Monmouthshire to Southampton, Hampshire.

== 24 December ==
List of shipwrecks: 24 December 1851
Ship	State	Description
Emerald	United Kingdom	The schooner foundered in the North Sea off Orfordness, Suffolk. Her crew survived. She was on a voyage from Great Yarmouth, Norfolk to Plymouth, Devon.
Grace Wright	United Kingdom	The schooner ran aground and was damaged in the canal between Blacksod Bay and Broadhaven Bay. She was on a voyage from Newport, County Mayo to Liverpool, Lancashire. She was refloated and taken in to Westport, County Mayo in a leaky condition.
HMS Sampson	Royal Navy	The frigate was driven ashore and damaged on Ascension Island. She was refloated.

== 25 December ==
List of shipwrecks: 25 December 1851
Ship	State	Description
Clio	Norway	The ship ran aground on the Brake Sand, off the coast of Kent, United Kingdom. She was on a voyage from Hull, Yorkshire to Alexandria, Egypt. She was refloated and taken in to Ramsgate, Kent in a leaky condition.
Skimmer	United Kingdom	The hulk caught fire and exploded in the Benin River at Bonny with loss of life.
Springflower	United Kingdom	The skiff was lost on the Helwick Bank in the Bristol Channel.

== 26 December ==
List of shipwrecks: 26 December 1851
Ship	State	Description
Eliza	United Kingdom	The ship sank in the Gwyndraeth Estuary. She was on a voyage from Barrow in Furnesss, Lancashire to Porthcawl, Glamorgan.
Speculation	United Kingdom	The ship ran aground off Warkworth, Northumberland. She was on a voyage from Warkworth to London. She was refloated and taken in to Warkworth.

== 27 December ==
List of shipwrecks: 27 December 1851
Ship	State	Description
Anna Alida	Netherlands	The ship departed from Zoutkamp, Groningen for London, United Kingdom. No further trace, presumed foundered with the loss of all hands.
Arrow	United Kingdom	The schooner ran aground on the Long Sand, in the North Sea off the coast of Essex and capsized. Her crew were rescued by the smack Aurora's Increase (United Kingdom). She was on a voyage from Seaham, County Durham to Bordeaux, Gironde.
Blossom	United Kingdom	The ship ran aground on the Whitby Rock. She was on a voyage from Blyth, Northumberland to Havre de Grâce, Seine-Inférieure, France. She was refloated with the assistance of the tug Sampson (United Kingdom) and resumed her voyage.
Frederick Warren	United States	The barque ran aground on the Haisborough Sands, in the North Sea off the coast of Norfolk, United Kingdom. She was on a voyage from Newcastle upon Tyne, Northumberland to New York. She was refloated the next day and taken in to Great Yarmouth, Norfolk in a leaky condition.
Harleys	United Kingdom	The ship was driven ashore on Euboea, Greece. She was on a voyage from Corfu to Zakynthos, Greece. She was refloated on 12 April 1852 and taken in to Syros, Greece.
Orion	United Kingdom	The ship ran aground on the Whitby Rock and was wrecked. She was on a voyage from Newcastle upon Tyne, Northumberland to London.

== 28 December ==
List of shipwrecks: 28 December 1851
Ship	State	Description
Amis Reunis	France	The ship ran aground off Ouessant, Finistère and was damaged. She was on a voyage from Liverpool, Lancashire, United Kingdom to Nantes, Loire-Inférieure. She was refloated and put in to Carnac, Morbihan in a leaky condition.
Bertha	Hamburg	The barque was wrecked on a reef south of Gorgona Island, Republic of New Granada. Her fourteen crew survived the wreck, but one of them died before they reached "Molo" in their boat. She was on a voyage from Panama City, Republic of New Granada to Falmouth, Cornwall, United Kingdom.
E. C. Scranton	United States	The ship ran aground in the East River. She was on a voyage from Liverpool to New York.
Home	United Kingdom	The ship was wrecked on the north coast of Canouan Island, Grenadines. Her crew were rescued. She was on a voyage from Demerara, British Guiana to Liverpool, Lancashire.
Liverpool	United Kingdom	The ship foundered in the Atlantic Ocean. Eighteen people were rescued by Element (United Kingdom). Liverpool was on a voyage from Coquimbo, Chile to Queenstown, County Cork.
Paragon	United Kingdom	The brig was driven ashore and wrecked at Squeak Point, British North America. She was on a voyage from Halifax, Nova Scotia to Saint John, New Brunswick, British North America.
Queen	United Kingdom	The ship ran aground in the Straits of Scio. She was on a voyage from Zakynthos, Greece to Smyrna, Ottoman Empire.
Una	United Kingdom	The ship was wrecked on Neah Bay Island. She was on a voyage from Queen Charlotte Island to Victoria, Colony of Vancouver Island.
Venus	United Kingdom	The ship sprang a leak and was beached at Lowestoft, Suffolk. She was on a voyage from Sunderland, County Durham to Rouen, Seine-Inférieure, France.

== 29 December ==
List of shipwrecks: 29 December 1851
Ship	State	Description
Elizabeth	United Kingdom	The brig was abandoned in the Atlantic Ocean. Her crew were rescued by the barque Cleone (United States). Elizabeth was on a voyage from Cardiff, Glamorgan to New York, United States.
London Merchant	United Kingdom	The steamship ran aground at South Shields, County Durham. She was on a voyage from London to South Shields. She was refloated and taken in to South Shields.
Olive	(United Kingdom of Great Britain and Ireland) British North America	The schooner was wrecked near Liscomb, Nova Scotia. She was on a voyage from Prince Edward Island to Boston, Massachusetts, United States.
Phantom	United Kingdom	The ship was severely damaged by fire at Newport, Monmouthshire.
Pilgrim	United Kingdom	The schooner was driven ashore 2 nautical miles (3.7 km) south of Arklow, County Wicklow. She was on a voyage from Dublin to Arklow.
Sylphide	France	The ship was driven ashore at Saint-Malo, Ille-et-Vilaine. She was on a voyage from Bordeaux, Gironde to Rouen, Seine-Inférieure.
William	United Kingdom	The brig ran aground off Shoeburyness, Essex.

== 30 December ==
List of shipwrecks: 30 December 1851
Ship	State	Description
Alpha	(United Kingdom of Great Britain and Ireland) British North America	The ship capsized in the Atlantic Ocean with the loss of four of her crew. Survivors were rescued the next day by Governor ( (United Kingdom of Great Britain and Ireland) British North America). Alpha was on a voyage from Saint John, New Brunswick to Boston, Massachusetts, United States.
Economy	United Kingdom	The ship ran aground off Mundesley, Norfolk. She caught fire and was destroyed. She was on a voyage from the Clyde to London.
Ellen	United Kingdom	The ship ran aground and was damaged. She was on a voyage from South Shields, County Durham to London. She was refloated and taken in to Great Yarmouth, Norfolk in a leaky condition.
Mercia	United Kingdom	The brig was driven ashore at Dunnose, Isle of Wight. She was on a voyage from Sunderland, County Durham to Cartagena, Spain.
Pink	United Kingdom	The schooner was wrecked on the Horse Rocks, off the coast of Yorkshire. Her crew were rescued. She was on a voyage from Alloa, Clackmannanshire to Dunkirk, Nord, France.
Sabina	Sweden	The ship ran aground on the Longsand, in the North Sea off the coast of Essex, United Kingdom. She was on a voyage from Gothenburg to Palma de Mallorca, Spain. She was refloated and assisted in to Harwich, Essex.

== 31 December ==
List of shipwrecks: 31 December 1851
Ship	State	Description
Carolina Margaretha	Denmark	The ship was driven ashore at Dragør. She was on a voyage from Stege to Hull, Yorkshire, United Kingdom. She was refloated on 2 January 1852 and taken in to Copenhagen.
Tres Hermanos	Spain	The ship was driven ashore and wrecked at St. Ubes, Portugal. She was on a voyage from "Carrel" to Cádiz.
Villa de Jabea	United Kingdom	The ship was driven ashore at St. Ubes. She was on a voyage from Santander to "Jabea".

== Unknown date ==
List of shipwrecks: Unknown date in December 1851
Ship	State	Description
Adelaide	United Kingdom	The ship was wrecked on Terceira Island, Azores.
Agnes	United Kingdom	The ship ran aground on the Bahama Banks before 24 December. She was on a voyage from British Honduras to London. She was refloated and put in to Charleston, South Carolina.
Alida Margaretha	France	The ship ran aground in the Orne before 31 December and was damaged. She was on a voyage from Caen, Caen to Amsterdam, North Holland, Netherlands.
Angelica	Russia	The sloop was driven ashore at Dover, Kent, United Kingdom. She was refloated on 4 December but capsized. She was taken in to Dover in that condition. Angelica was on a voyage from Porto, Portugal to Riga.
Arabia	United Kingdom	The steamship ran aground at Smyrna, Ottoman Empire. She was refloated with assistance from Feyzâ-i Bahrî (Ottoman Navy).
Baracoa	United Kingdom	The brig was wrecked off Cuba. She was on a voyage from Montego Bay, Jamaica to Glasgow, Renfrewshire.
Bathurst	United Kingdom	The ship was lost off Bonaca Island, British Honduras before 5 December with the loss of all hands.
British Queen	United Kingdom	The ship was wrecked on Muskeget Island, Massachusetts, United States with the loss of four lives. She was on a voyage from Dublin to New York, United States.
Cassandra	United Kingdom	The barque was destroyed by fire in the Pacific Ocean before 8 December. All on board were rescued.
Celine	France	The ship was abandoned in the Atlantic Ocean before 2 December. She was discovered by HMS Havannah (Royal Navy) on that date. A skeleton crew was put aboard and she was taken in to Brest, Finistère, where she arrived on 6 December. She had been on a voyage from Alicante, Spain to Bordeaux, Gironde.
Christine	Norway	The schooner foundered in the Mediterranean Sea off Mallorca, Spain before 3 December. Her crew were rescued.
Commerce	United Kingdom	The ship was driven ashore between Turnberry, Ayrshire and Corsewall Point, Wigtownshire before 23 December. Her crew survived.
Conway Castle	United Kingdom	The ship was wrecked on a reef off Sumatra, Netherlands East Indies.
Diadem	United Kingdom	The brig was wrecked in Plettenberg Bay on 4 or 14 December. Her crew were rescued.
Elfa	Hamburg	The ship was wrecked on Heligoland. She was on a voyage from Hamburg to Gothenburg, Sweden.
Elizabeth	United States	The ship was wrecked on the Black Rock, off Mount Desert, Maine, United States. She was on a voyage from Prince Edward Island, British North America to Boston, Massachusetts.
Ellen, or Helen	(United Kingdom of Great Britain and Ireland) Guernsey	The ship was driven ashore in the River Plate before 24 December. She was on a voyage from Cádiz, Spain to Buenos Aires, Argentina. She was refloated but consequently sank.
Ellen Jane	United Kingdom	The ship was wrecked on Terceira Island.
Emblem	United Kingdom	The ship was driven ashore in the Dardanelles. She was on a voyage from Galaţi, Ottoman Empire to a British port. She was refloated on 5 January 1852 and taken in to "Nagara".
Freihandel	Bremen	The ship was abandoned in the Atlantic Ocean before 20 December. All on board were rescued by St. George (United Kingdom). Freihandel was on a voyage from Bremen to New York, United States.
George and Anna	United Kingdom	The ship was wrecked in the Queen Charlotte Islands. Her crew and 24 passengers were taken prisoner by the local inhabitants.
Ghazeepore	India	The steamship was lost in the Hooghly River before 2 December.
G. H. Harrison	United Kingdom	The schooner was wrecked on the coast of the Cape Colony before 8 December. Her crew were rescued by Adderley (United Kingdom).
Gleaner	United Kingdom	The ship was driven ashore near North Berwick, Berwickshire before 10 December. She was on a voyage from South Shields, county Durham to Alloa, Clackmannanshire.
Hope	(United Kingdom of Great Britain and Ireland) British North America	The brig was abandoned in the Atlantic Ocean 40 nautical miles (74 km) off the coast of Massachusetts, United States before 8 December.
Ida Jacoba	Netherlands	The ship was driven ashore near Falsterbo, Sweden. She was on a voyage from Stettin to Rotterdam, South Holland.
Industry	(United States)	The ship was abandoned in the Atlantic Ocean before 8 December. Her crew were rescued.
Industry	United Kingdom	The schooner was wrecked on an island 60 nautical miles (110 km) north of Bergen, Norway with the loss of at least four lives.
Industry	United Kingdom	The ship was driven ashore near Yalta, Russia before 8 December. Her crew were rescued.
Lela	United Kingdom	The schooner was abandoned in the Atlantic Ocean. Her crew were rescued by Susan (United Kingdom). Lela was on a voyage from Wilmington, North Carolina, United States to Liverpool, Lancashire.
Maria	Duchy of Holstein	The ship sprang a leak and was beached at Porto Ottiolu, Sardinia. She was on a voyage from Barcelona, Spain to Cette, Hérault, France.
Marie	Rostock	The brig ran aground on the Goodwin Sands, Kent. She was on a voyage from Antwerp, Belgium to Constantinople, Ottoman Empire. She was refloated on 14 December.
Mary	United Kingdom	The smack was abandoned in the Irish Sea. She was taken in to Holyhead, Anglesey on 5 December.
Minerva	United Kingdom	The ship was driven ashore near Ostend, West Flanders, Belgium. She was on a voyage from Liverpool to Ostend.
Miranda	United Kingdom	The ship was wrecked on Terceira Island.
Ocean	United Kingdom	The schooner was driven ashore at Sunderland, County Durham.
Othello	United Kingdom	The ship was abandoned off Anholt, Denmark. She was towed in to Helsingør, Denmark on 10 December.
Pearl	United Kingdom	The ship was wrecked on Terceira Island with the loss of two of her crew.
Rachel	(United Kingdom of Great Britain and Ireland) Jersey	The ship foundered in the Atlantic Ocean (33°15′N 23°00′W). Her crew were rescued by the brig Aimable (France).
Sabina	Sweden	The ship ran aground on the Longsand, in the North Sea off the coast of Essex, United Kingdom. She was later refloated.
Saucy Jack	United Kingdom	The ship ran aground on the Kimmeridge Ledge, in the English Channel off the coast of Dorset. She was refloated on 8 December and towed in to Weymouth, Dorset.
Speedy	United Kingdom	The ship was wrecked on Terceira Island.
Sprightly	United Kingdom	The ship was wrecked on Terceira Island.
St. Andrew	United Kingdom	The ship was foundered in the North Sea off the coast of County Durham before 16 December.
Susan	United Kingdom	The ship was wrecked on Terceira Island.
Trial	(United Kingdom of Great Britain and Ireland) British North America	The schooner was driven ashore at Pictou, Nova Scotia. She was on a voyage from Boston, Massachusetts to Prince Edward Island.
Triumph	(United Kingdom of Great Britain and Ireland) British North America	The ship was wrecked on Cape Breton Island, Nova Scotia before 9 December. Her crew were rescued.
Tyendenaga	United Kingdom	The ship was wrecked on "Cariboo Island" with the loss of seventeen lives. She was on a voyage from Quebec City, Province of Canada, British North America to London.
Wilhelmine Charlotte	Rostock	The schooner was wrecked on the Anholt Reef, in the Baltic Sea. She was on a voyage from Liverpool to Rostock.
William	United States	The ship was wrecked at L'Ardoise, Nova Scotia. She was on a voyage from New York to Prince Edward Island.
William Clewes	United Kingdom	The ship was driven ashore at North Berwick before 10 December.
