= South Thompson River =

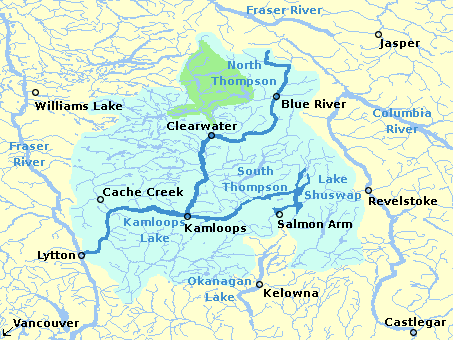
- Thompson River's watershed
- Etymology: The Thompson River was named by Simon Fraser in honour of David Thompson

Location
- Country: Canada
- Province: British Columbia
- District: Kamloops Division Yale

Physical characteristics
- Source: Little Shuswap Lake
  - coordinates: 50°49′50″N 119°41′29″W
  - elevation: 347 m (1,138 ft)
- Mouth: Thompson River
  - location: Kamloops
  - coordinates: 50°40′50″N 120°20′19″W
  - elevation: 336 m (1,102 ft)
- Length: 58 km (36 mi)
- Basin size: 18,000 km^{2} (6,900 sq mi)
- Discharge
  - location: Chase
  - average: 292 m^{3}/s (10,300 cu ft/s)
  - minimum: 45.3 m^{3}/s (1,600 cu ft/s)
  - maximum: 1,610 m^{3}/s (57,000 cu ft/s)

Basin features
- Tributaries
  - left: Chase Creek, Monte Creek, Campbell Creek
  - right: Niskonlith Creek

The South Thompson River is the southern branch of the Thompson River, the largest tributary of the Fraser River, in the Canadian province of British Columbia. It originates at the outlet of Little Shuswap Lake at the town of Chase and flows approximately 58 kilometres (36 mi) southwest and west through a wide valley to Kamloops where it joins the North Thompson River to form the main stem Thompson River.

Highway 1, the Trans-Canada Highway, and the mainline of the Canadian Pacific Railway parallel the river. Little Shuswap Lake is fed by the Little River, which drains Shuswap Lake, which is fed by several rivers and creeks.

Before 1982, the river was considered to start at the outlet of Shuswap Lake rather than Little Shuswap Lake, but the short river between Shuswap Lake and Little Shuswap Lake was officially renamed Little River in keeping with long-established local usage.

The South Thompson's main tributaries are Chase Creek, which joins from the south at Chase, Niskonlith Creek, which joins from the north near Niskonlith Lake Provincial Park, Monte Creek, which joins from the south at Monte Creek, and Campbell Creek, which joins from the south.

== Geology and vegetation ==
During the Late Pleistocene, the drainage of the glacial lakes formed the floodplain flanked by deeply carved terraces along both sides of the valley. This glacial recession occurred 11,000 to 11,500 years ago. During the Holocene Climate Optimum (HCO), the postglacial vegetation changed markedly as warmer and drier conditions replaced cool and moist ones. Douglas fir, grasses, and sagebrush increased, while pine declined. Then, a period of cooler and wetter conditions gave way to the modern climate about 4,500 years ago.

== See also ==
- List of rivers of British Columbia
- List of tributaries of the Fraser River
