= Little River Beach =

Little River Beach may refer to:

- A beach at the mouth of Little River (Vancouver Island), in British Columbia, Canada
- A beach at the mouth of Little River (Mendocino County), in California, US
- Little River State Beach, in Humboldt County, California, US

== See also ==
- Goose Rocks Beach, at the mouth of the Little River in Kennebunkport, Maine, US
