= Squilax, British Columbia =

Coordinates: 50.872°N 119.586°W

Location of Squilax in British Columbia

Squilax is a settlement in British Columbia, located on the northeast shore of Little Shuswap Lake.

Squilax, as distinguished from Chase, which is adjacent, refers to the reserve communities of the Little Shuswap Indian Band, whose head offices are on Quaaout Indian Reserve No. 1, one of the five reserves governed by that band.

Squilax, also spelt "Skw'lax" is close to the Secwepmectsin word for Black Bear. Almost everyone in the area is family or grew up together. Two well known families in the area are the Arnouse's and August's who have lived in the land for a long time. The August family is originally from Enderby, but moved for unknown reasons. Squilax holds a Pow Wow every summer and competitions for dancers. It is a fairly small area to the point once you live there you know who lives in which house, what trails will take you where, and kids run around and their parents know where exactly they are. It is a close community with many stories. There are traditional winter houses and summer houses by the Quaaout Lodge and Talking Rock Resort.
