= Little River Railroad =

Little River Railroad may refer to:

- Little River Railroad (Michigan), a heritage railroad in Coldwater
- Little River Railroad (Tennessee) (1901–1939), a class III railroad between Maryville and Elkmont

== See also ==
- Little River (disambiguation)
- Little River Township (disambiguation)
