= Melluži Station =

Railway stop in Melluži, Latvia

Melluži
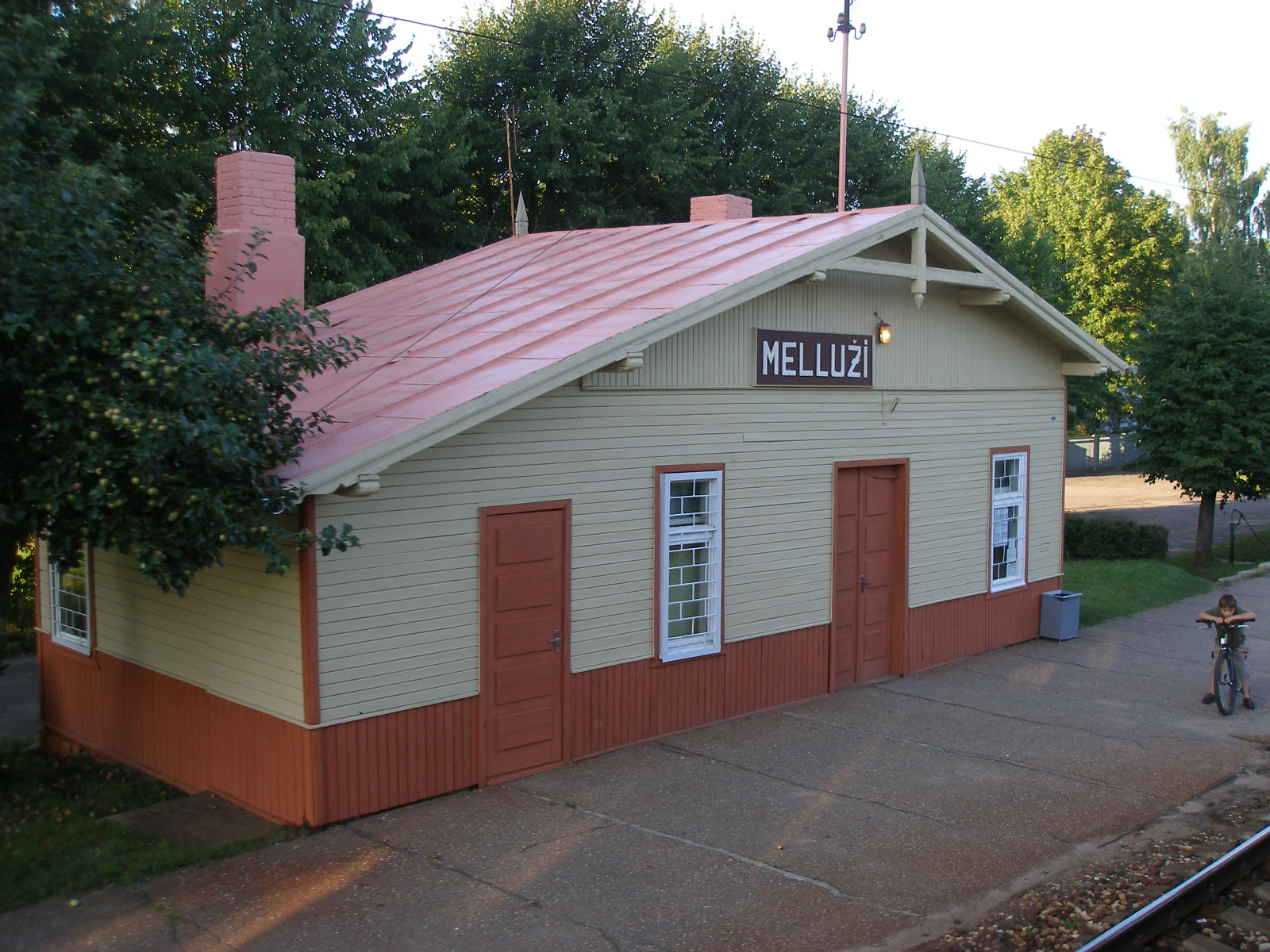

General information
- Location: Kanālu 20a Melluži, Jūrmala; Latvia
- Coordinates: 56°57′32.13″N 23°42′45.94″E

Services
Preceding station	LDz	Following station
Asari towards Tukums II	Torņakalns–Tukums II Railway	Pumpuri towards Riga
Location

Melluži Station is a railway station serving the Melluži residential neighbourhood of the city of Jūrmala, Latvia. The station is located on the Torņakalns – Tukums II Railway. There is a single station building on the north side of the railway, accessed from Mežsargu Iela.
