= La Petite Rivière =

La Petite Rivière may refer to:

- La Petite Rivière (Anticosti Island - Eastern part), a tributary of the Gulf of St. Lawrence in the eastern part of Anticosti Island, Quebec, Canada
- La Petite Rivière (Anticosti Island - Western part), a tributary of the Gulf of St. Lawrence in the western part of Anticosti Island, Quebec, Canada
- La Petite Rivière (Cami River tributary), a tributary of the Cami River in the Fjord-du-Saguenay Regional County Municipality, Quebec, Canada
- La Petite Rivière (Nelson River tributary), a tributary stream of the Nelson River in Capitale-Nationale, Quebec, Canada

== See also ==
- Little River (disambiguation)
