= Skwlāx te Secwepemcúl̓ecw =

- Band No. 689
- Skwlāx te Secwepemcúl̓ecw
- People: Secwépemc
- Headquarters: Chase
- Province: British Columbia

Land
- Main reserve: Quaaout 1
- Land area: 31.12 km^{2} (12.02 sq mi)

Population (2024)
- On reserve: 197
- On other land: 44
- Off reserve: 148
- Total population: 389

Government
- Chief: Dianne Francois

Website
- lslb.ca

Skwlāx te Secwepemcúl̓ecw (Shuswap language: Skwlax) is a First Nations band government of a community of the Secwepemc Nation, located in the Central Interior region of British Columbia, Canada. Its main Indian reserve is in Chase, British Columbia, sometimes marked Squilax on maps ("black bear" in the Shuswap language) is properly called Quaaout, and is on the shore of Little Shuswap Lake. It was created when the government of the then-Colony of British Columbia established an Indian Reserve system in the 1860s.

Skwlax te Secwepemculecw has been focusing on bringing tourism to town as well as developing the local band economy. Multiple businesses have been added on the band's premises, including: Talking Rock Golf course, Quaaout Lodge, Skwlax Airstrip, Skwlax Centre.

== Governance ==
Dianne Francois currently serves as Kukpi7 (chief) of Skwlax te Secwépemcúl̓ecw, a First Nation near Chase, BC. Julie John and Dustin Tomma are currently serving as councillors. James Tomma previously served as Kukpi7.

== History ==
The First Nation is located in the Thompson Okanagan region of British Columbia. As of December 2024, there are 389 members of the Skwlax te Secwepemculecw. Not all of these members live in the same area though. Salmon Arm, Chase, and Kamloops are areas nearby where other members are residing. Only about 200 members live in Quaaout or Tappen. Only 10 percent of the community is unemployed, and those who are employed work at one of the First Nation's businesses; including Quaaout Lodge and Spa, Talking Rock Golf Course, and Little Shuswap Lake Gas station.

Skwlax te Secwepemculecw is one of seventeen bands that are a part of the Secwepemc Nation. 10,000 years ago the people of the Secwepemc Nation were living in the areas as far as Quesnel to Shuswap. This is an area of about 180,000 km^{2} (69,000 sq mi). In a thirteen-year span epidemics caused the Secwepemc people to perish. By 1903, 70% of the population died, leaving seventeen out of thirty tribes left. One of them being the Skwlax te Secwepemculecw.

=== Name ===
Before the Little Shuswap Lake Indian Band was named “Little Shuswap”, they went by some other names. In 1877, they were called “Alternate Little Lake” and in 1881, they went by “Kuaut” or “Kualt”. Their traditional name written in the Secwepemctsín language is “Qw7Ewt”.

=== Language ===
The native language of the Skwlax te Secwepemculecw is Secwepemctsín. Although the pronunciation differs, it is based on the English language. Secwepemctsín has 43 letters in its alphabet. According to UNESCO's Atlas of the World's Languages in Danger, there are roughly around 1,100 people left who can speak the Secwepemctsín language. Most of these native speakers have a mean age of around fifty years old. This means the language is gravely endangered. However, schools and some universities offer classes students can take to learn the language in an effort to save this part of their culture.

== Culture ==
Smudging is known as an art that involves a ceremony hosted by a knowledgeable, experienced elder in the act of smudging. The purpose of this ceremony is to clear everything around the individuals participating including the air, as well as their inner emotions and surrounding negativity. Sweetgrass, cedar, sage, and tobacco are collected for the smudging ceremony. A bowl, metal pan, or shell is needed to put the ingredients in. These, along with lighting them on fire and creating smoke, are supposed to represent the elements of air, water, earth, and fire. The experienced teacher or elder will pull the smoke towards them. They use the smoke to act out “washing their hands” and then they pull the smoke over their heads. This is symbolic for them to remember goodness through all of their senses. When the ceremony is over the ashes are then released onto the ground.

Canoe carving is a cultural practice for the Skwlax te Secwepemculecw community. They had stopped carving for sixty years and recently in 2017 decided to start practicing it again. They had help from another nearby band (Okanagan Indian Band) to refresh their memory on how to properly carve canoes, as well as teach the younger generations.

In 2018, they decided to rebuild a sweat lodge that was previously there. Grand Chief Felix Arnouse explained the importance of the sweat lodge. The sweat lodge can provide great healing and it is used for traditional purification processes. This happens through sweating out toxins from the body. It can be done through laughing, shouting, or crying with emphasis on letting go of negative energy. The Grand Chief sees the rebuilding of the sweat lodge as a way to share his culture with tourists. Sharing this experience with tourists will hopefully show their beliefs, value, and spirituality with Mother Earth. The new lodge was built with wood that was previously used on the original sweat lodge. Lava rocks are used to warm up the lodge since they hold temperatures well.

== COVID-19 ==
COVID-19 has affected many Indian nations and bands. Skwlax te Secwepemculecw is not an exception. They have had cases as well as closures of places and events. As of 2022, they have canceled all events indefinitely due to the COVID-19 pandemic. Kamloops Powwow, which is an annual festival they host has also been canceled for two years. It is not known whether events will be offered in the future.

== Businesses ==
=== Quaaout Lodge ===
Skwlax te Secwepemculecw band members decided they needed to grow their economy as well as build a lucrative business. Because job security was important to them, the band members came up with the idea to build a tourist lodge in 1979. The name “Quaaout” means “when the sun’s rays first hit the water” in Secwepemctsín. Secwepemctsín is the native language of the Little Shuswap people. Former chiefs William Arnouse and Felix Arnouse, as well as John Anderson worked on the business name, logo, and building design. The business was later opened in 1992. Since then, Quaaout Lodge has been expanded on, with the Quaaout Conference Centre in 2001 and Talking Rock Golf Course in 2007. They also added a few restaurants, upgraded the hotel from a three star hotel to a five star hotel, and lastly added Leyke Day Spa in 2011.

=== Talking Rock Golf Course ===
This golf course's name was chosen significantly by band members. The name comes from their ancestors who painted or carved rocks to tell their stories. These were known as pictographs. Planning began in 1992 and by 1995, architects Graham Cooke & Wayne Carlton designed the future golf course. The course was officially opened in March 2007.

=== Skwlax Wellness Centre ===
The Skwlax Wellness Centre is used for health and social development programs and services. Programs offered include community health programs, social development such as income assistance and support for low income individuals and mental health counseling. They also offer summer day camp programs, dental treatment, child welfare liaison, as well as mandatory health programs. The mandatory health programs are designed to assist in giving immunizations and following protocols for disease control.

== Reserves ==
Little Shuswap Indian Band has jurisdiction over the following reserves:

- Quaaout 1
- Chum Creek 2
- Meadow Creek 3
- Scotch Creek 4
- North Bay 5

== See also ==
- Shuswap Nation Tribal Council
- Chase, British Columbia
