= Little Shuswap Lake =

Lake in British Columbia, Canada

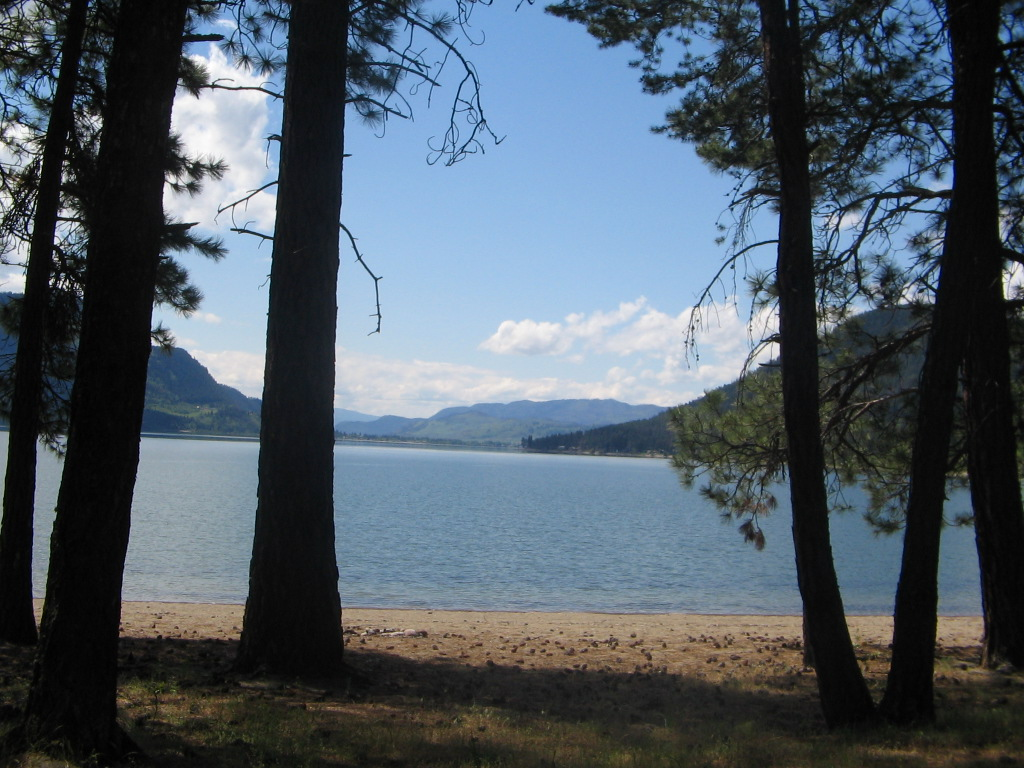

- Location within British Columbia
- Location: British Columbia
- Coordinates: 50°51′N 119°38′W
- Primary inflows: Little River
- Primary outflows: South Thompson River
- Basin countries: Canada
- Max. length: 7.9 km (4.9 mi)
- Max. width: 2.4 km (1.5 mi)
- Surface area: 18.1 km^{2} (7.0 sq mi)
- Average depth: 14.3 m (47 ft)
- Max. depth: 59.4 m (195 ft)
- Water volume: 260,634,324 m^{3} (9.2042143×10^{9} cu ft)
- Surface elevation: 347 m (1,138 ft)
- Islands: None
- Settlements: Chase, British Columbia

Little Shuswap Lake is a small lake in the Thompson River basin of the southern Interior of British Columbia, Canada, which sits at the transition between the Thompson Country to the west and the Shuswap Country to the east. It is fed by the Little River, which flows from Shuswap Lake, and is the main source of water for the South Thompson River, which begins at the lake's outlet at its southwestern end. The lake is approximately 7.8 kilometres (4.8 mi) in length, NE to SW, and averages 2.4 kilometres (1.5 mi) in width and is approximately 18 square kilometres (6.9 sq mi) in area. It has a mean depth of 14.3 metres (47 ft) to a maximum of 59.4 metres (195 ft).

The recreational and Secwepemc First Nations community of Chase (known as Quaaout in the Secwepemc language) is at the lake's southern end. The smaller community of Squilax lies at the lake's northern end, on the north side of the estuary of the Little River. The TransCanada Highway and Canadian Pacific Railway run along the lake's eastern shore.

== See also ==
- List of lakes of British Columbia
- Little Shuswap Indian Band
