= Niskonlith Lake Provincial Park =

Provincial park of British Columbia, Canada

- IUCN category II (national park)
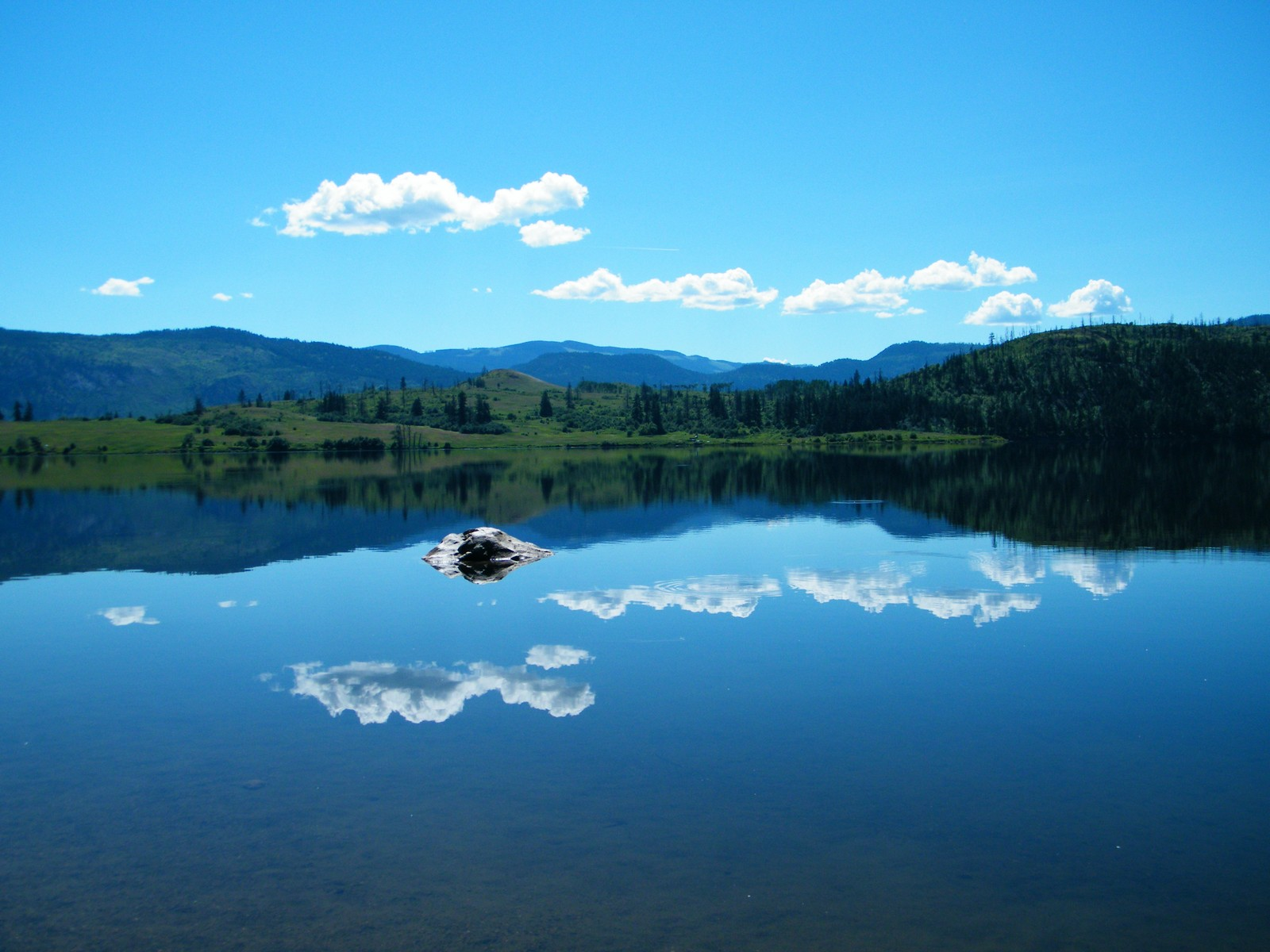
- Panoramic view

- Location within British Columbia
- Interactive map of Niskonlith Lake Provincial Park
- Location: British Columbia, Canada
- Nearest city: Chase
- Coordinates: 50°47′44″N 119°46′40″W
- Area: 2.75 km^{2} (1.06 sq mi)
- Established: September 4, 1975
- Governing body: BC Parks
- Website: bcparks.ca/niskonlith-lake-park/

Niskonlith Lake Provincial Park is a provincial park in British Columbia, Canada, located southwest of the town of Chase. The park makes up an area of 275 hectares (680 acres).
