= Little River (Cariboo River tributary) =

Tributary river in British Columbia, Canada

Coordinates: 52°49′00″N 121°17′00″W

The Little River is a 35 km river in the Cariboo region of British Columbia, Canada, rising in the Cariboo Mountains north of the North Arm of Quesnel Lake and running roughly westwards to enter Cariboo Lake conjointly with the upper Cariboo River.

== See also ==
- Little River, British Columbia, a community in the Comox Valley region of British Columbia
- Little River (Vancouver Island), a stream in the Comox Valley region of British Columbia
- Little River (Little Shuswap Lake), a river in the Shuswap Country region of British Columbia
