= Little River (Oregon) =

Little River is the name of two rivers in the U.S. state of Oregon:

- Little River (North Umpqua River)
- Little River (Coast Fork Willamette River)
