= Teal Creek =

Coordinates: 37°28′5″S 149°44′36″E

Teal Creek Little River

Location
- Country: Australia
- State: Victoria
- Region: South East Corner (IBRA), East Gippsland
- Local government area: Shire of East Gippsland

Physical characteristics
- Source: Mount Nadgee
  - location: near Gipsy Point
  - elevation: 123 m (404 ft)
- Mouth: Mallacoota Inlet, Tasman Sea
  - location: north of Mallacoota
  - elevation: 32 m (105 ft)
- Length: 6 km (3.7 mi)

Basin features
- River system: Genoa River catchment
- National park: Croajingolong NP

The Teal Creek, formerly known as Little River, is a perennial stream of the Genoa River catchment, in the East Gippsland region of the Australian state of Victoria.

== Course and features ==
The Teal Creek rises below the southeast slopes of Mount Nadgee, near Gipsy Point within Croajingolong National Park, north of Mallacoota and south of the New South Wales and Victorian border. The creek flows generally northeast, then southeast, before reaching its mouth in the northeastern arm of the Mallacoota Wildlife Reserve within the Mallacoota Inlet in the Shire of East Gippsland. The creek descends 91 metres (299 ft) over its 6 kilometres (3.7 mi) course.

== See also ==
- List of rivers of Australia
