= Little River, British Columbia =

Human settlement in British Columbia, Canada

Coordinates: 49.73333°N 124.916666°W

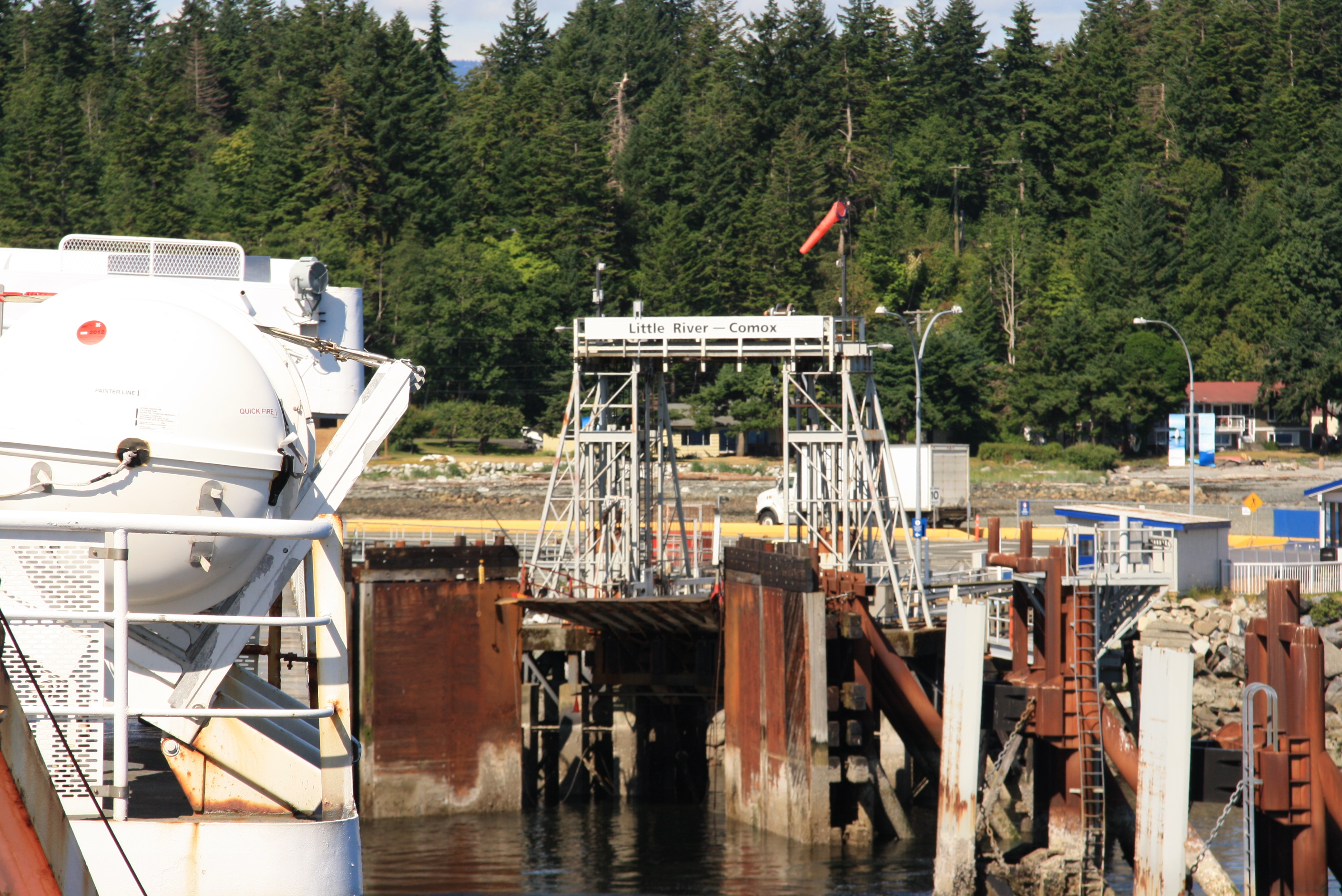
Little River Ferry Terminal

Little River is a community in the Comox Valley region of Vancouver Island, British Columbia, Canada.

Its namesake, Little River, is a short stream of the same name which enters Little River Bay. The community lies to the east of the river's confluence with the bay.

== Comox Ferry Terminal ==
There is a BC Ferries terminal at Little River which connects to Powell River (Westview) on the upper Sunshine Coast. The ferry runs daily and the crossing time is 90 minutes. The terminal also provides service to Blubber Bay on Texada Island. The terminal has a single berth and is accessed via Ellenor Road.

== See also ==
- Little River (Vancouver Island)
- Little River (Cariboo River), a river in the Cariboo region of British Columbia
- Little River (Little Shuswap Lake), a river in the Shuswap Country region of British Columbia
