= Porto Ottiolu =

Marina in Province of Sassari, Sardinia

Coordinates: 40.7374°N 9.7075°E

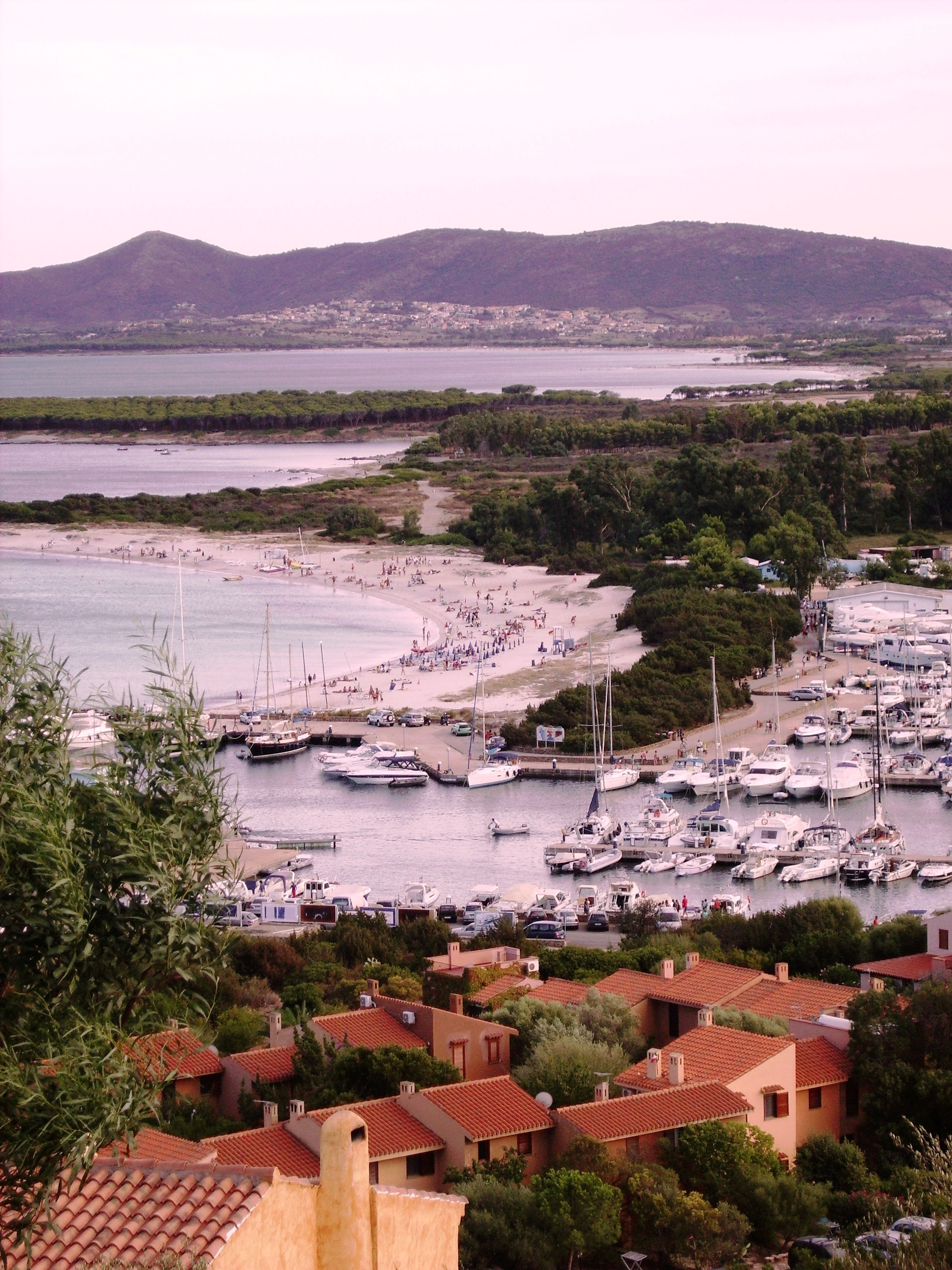
Porto Ottiolu

Porto Ottiolu is a private marina and a tourist destination located in the comune of Budoni, Province of Sassari, Sardinia, Italy, on Tyrrhenian Sea, about 35 km south of Olbia.

== Overview ==
It was built in 1988 in the place where once there was the ancient Roman port of Portiolum, and after its immediate success, a huge village was built around it with the same name.

The marina can host 405 boats in 8 classes and has complete services. It is the largest marina of the East coast of Sardinia.

In its waters, apneist diver Gianluca Genoni repeatedly scored new world records.

Other activities include fishing.
