= Little River (South Carolina) =

Little River may refer to the following rivers in the U.S. state of South Carolina:

- Little River (Broad River), a tributary of the Broad River
- Little River (Horry County, South Carolina), flowing directly into the Atlantic Ocean
  - Little River Inlet, the southern mouth of the above river
- Little River (McCormick County, South Carolina), a tributary of the Savannah River
- Little River (Oconee County, South Carolina), a tributary of the Keowee River
- Little River (Saluda River), a tributary of the Saluda River in Newberry and Laurens Counties
