= Little River (Little Shuswap Lake) =

Location
- Country: Canada
- Province: British Columbia
- Land District: Kamloops Division Yale

Physical characteristics
- Source: Shuswap Lake
  - coordinates: 50°52′50″N 119°33′37″W
  - elevation: 1,138 ft (347 m)
- Mouth: Little Shuswap Lake
  - coordinates: 50°51′53″N 119°36′20″W

The Little River, also known as the Little Shuswap River, is a 3.6-kilometre (2.2 mi) river in the Shuswap Country region of British Columbia, Canada. It drains Shuswap Lake just below the mouth of the Adams River and feeds Little Shuswap Lake, which is the head of the South Thompson River. The Little River is essentially the same stream as the South Thompson, as there are no other major streams feeding Little Shuswap Lake. The river is spanned by Squilax Bridge which connects the Trans-Canada Highway to the communities around Adams Lake and the north shore of Shuswap Lake.

The Little River has one named tributary, Chum Creek, which enters it about 0.4 km above its mouth.

== See also ==
- Little River, British Columbia, a community in the Comox Valley region of British Columbia
- Little River (Vancouver Island), a stream in the Comox Valley region of British Columbia
- Little River (Cariboo River), a river in the Cariboo region of British Columbia
- List of rivers of British Columbia
