= Melluži =

Neighbourhood of Jūrmala, Latvia

Coordinates: 56°58′N 23°43′E

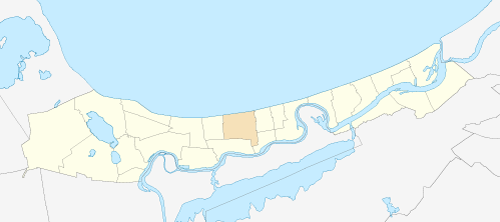
- Location in Jūrmala
- Country: Latvia
- City: Jūrmala

Area
  - Total: 4.1 km^{2} (1.6 sq mi)
- Elevation: 3 m (9.8 ft)

Population (2008)
  - Total: 3,372
  - Density: 822.4/km^{2} (2,130/sq mi)

Melluži is a residential area and neighbourhood in the city of Jūrmala, Latvia.

== History ==
An inn existed in Melluži in the 17th century. In 1827, Baron Karl Fircks build a Kurhaus (spa house) near the inn. Subsequently, the village became known to western visitors as Karlsbad. Plots for summer houses were leased from 1836. The Melluži railway station was established in 1914.

== Gallery ==
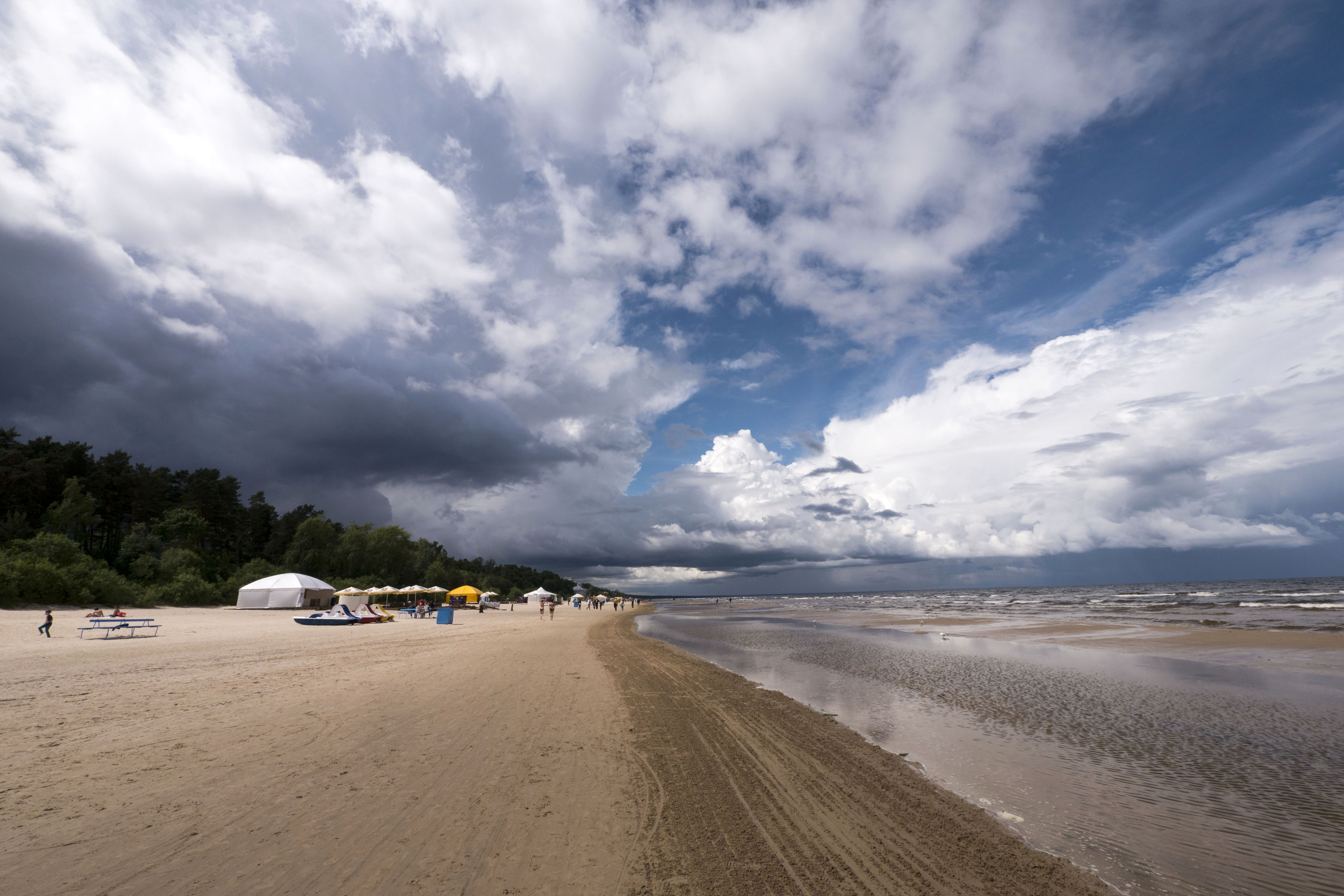
Melluži beach

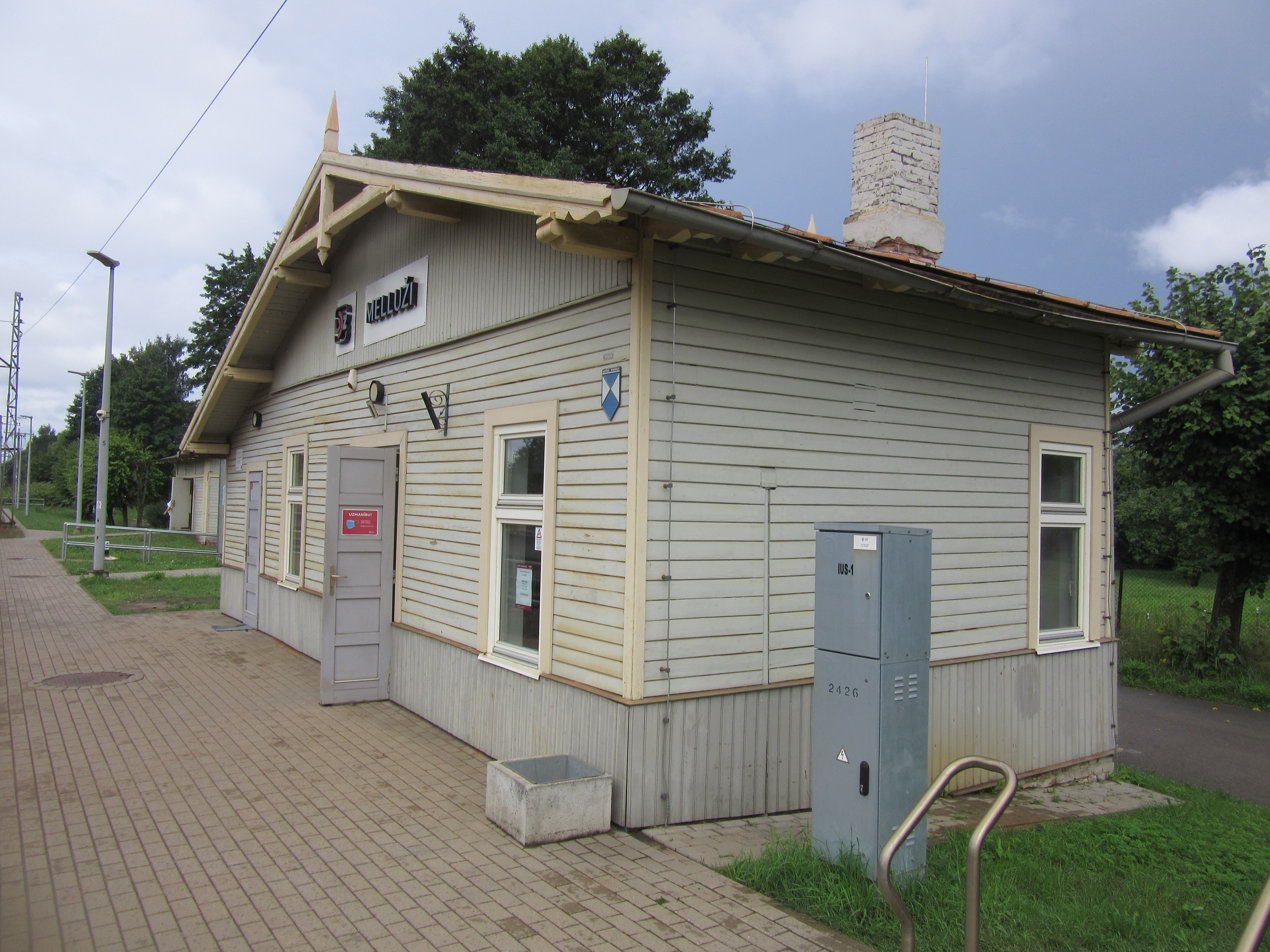
Melluži station

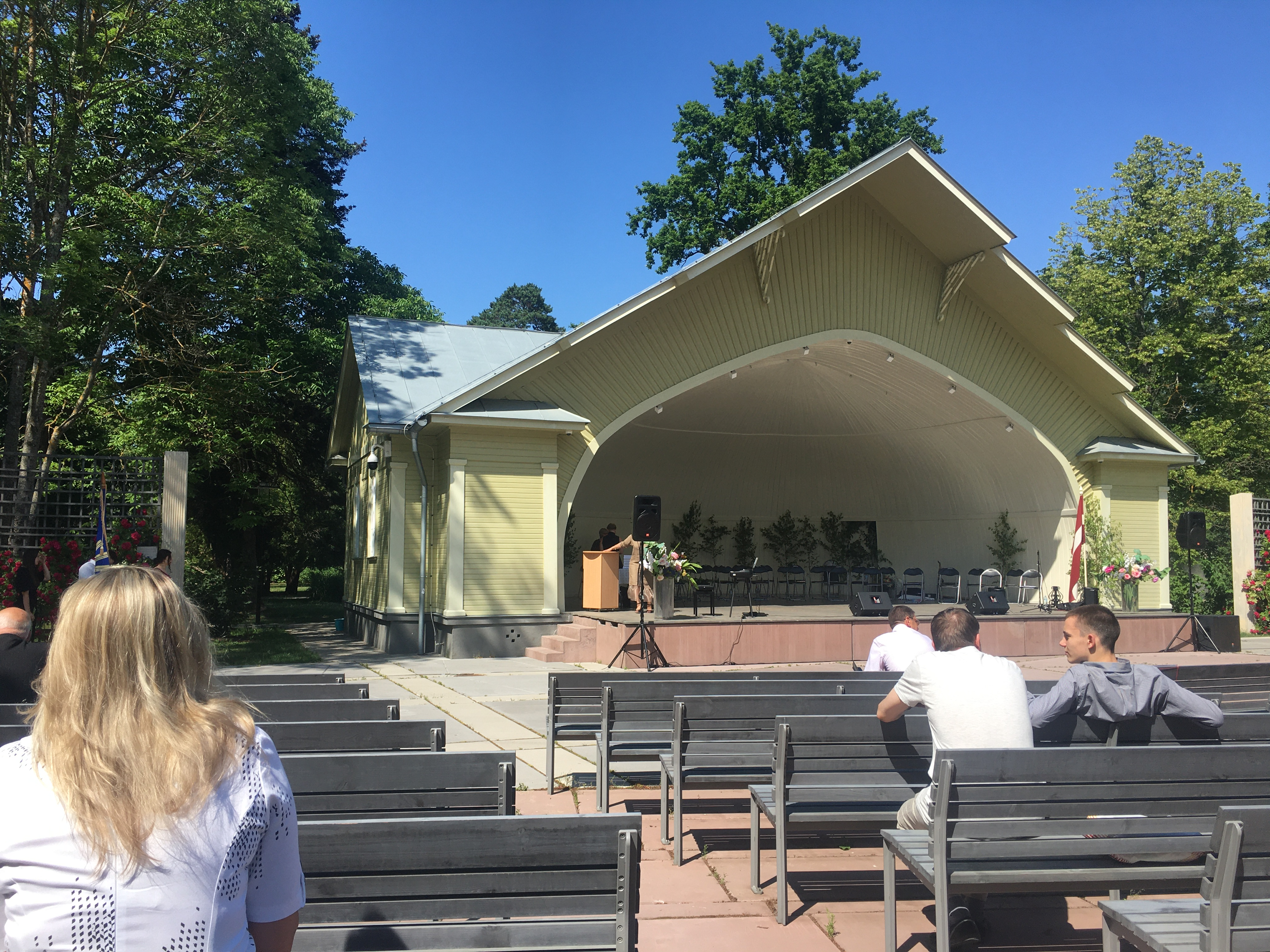
Melluži bandstand
