= Rio Pequeno =

Rio Pequeno may refer to:

- Rio Pequeno (district of São Paulo), a district in the city of São Paulo, Brazil
- Rio Pequeno (Santa Catarina), a tributary of the Braço do Norte River in southeastern Brazil
- Rio Pequeno (São Paulo), a tributary of Pinheiros River in southeastern Brazil
