= Little River, Victoria County, Nova Scotia =

Community in Nova Scotia, Canada

Coordinates: 46°26′37.58″N 60°28′0.08″W

Little River in Nova Scotia

Little River is a community in the Canadian province of Nova Scotia, located in Victoria County.
