= Little River (Vancouver Island) =

Coordinates: 49°44′00″N 124°55′00″W

The Little River is a tributary of Little River Bay in the Comox Valley region of Vancouver Island, British Columbia, Canada and the namesake of the community of Little River. Little River Bay is an arm of the Strait of Georgia.

Nearby, to the east of the river's mouth, is the BC Ferries terminal, which connects to Powell River on the upper Sunshine Coast. East of the ferry terminal are the community of Little River and the officially named Little River Beach.

A portion of the lower river is protected within the Little River Nature Park, which also contains beach plain habitat and estuarine salt marsh. These areas provide critical habitat for feeding birds and fish.

== See also ==
- Little River, British Columbia, a nearby community
- Little River (Cariboo River), a river in the Cariboo region of British Columbia
- Little River (Little Shuswap Lake), a river in the Shuswap Country region of British Columbia
