= Chase, British Columbia =

Chase
- Village
- Village of Chase
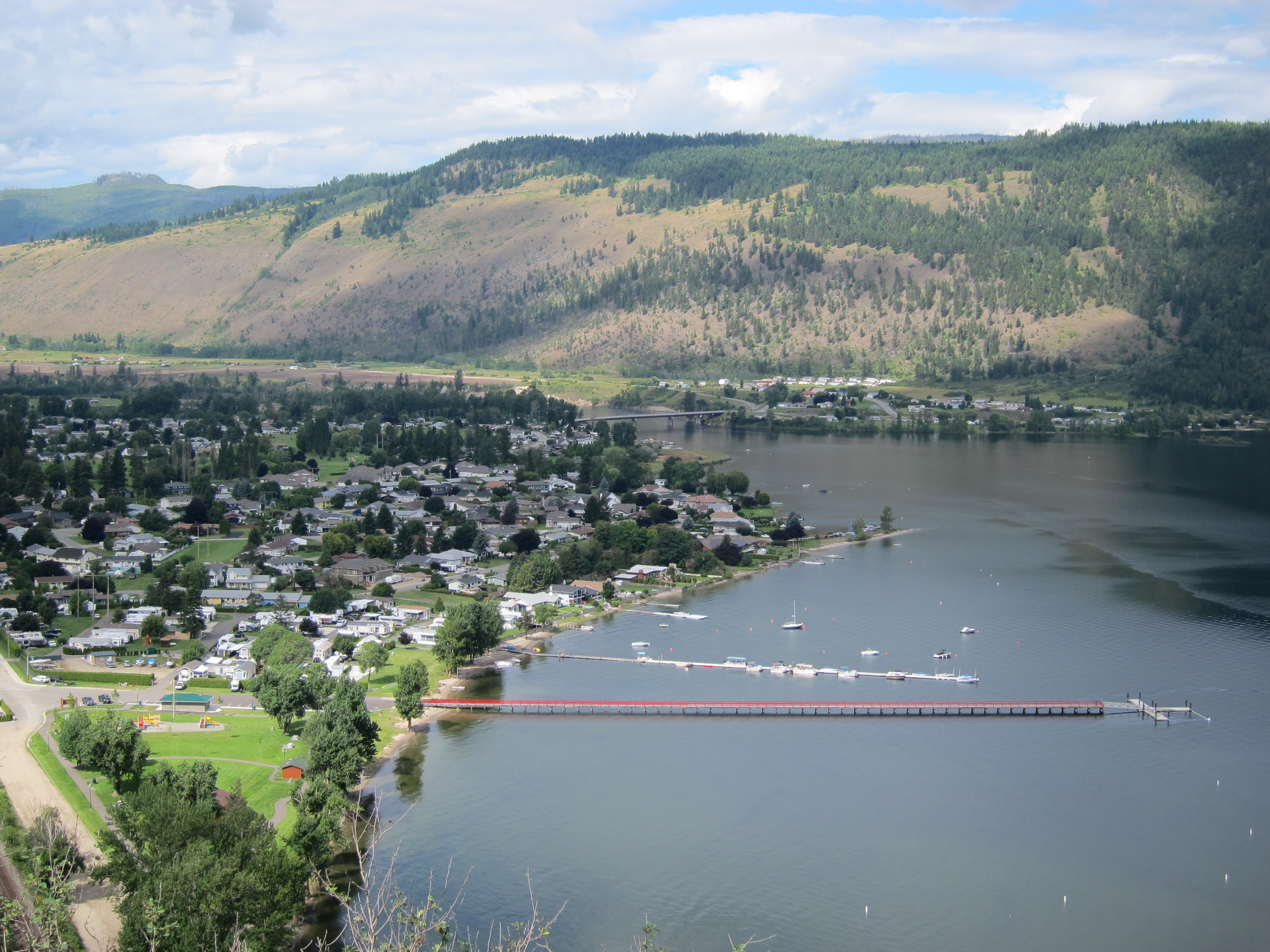
- Chase and Little Shuswap Lake
- Motto: Chase, a Shuswap Experience
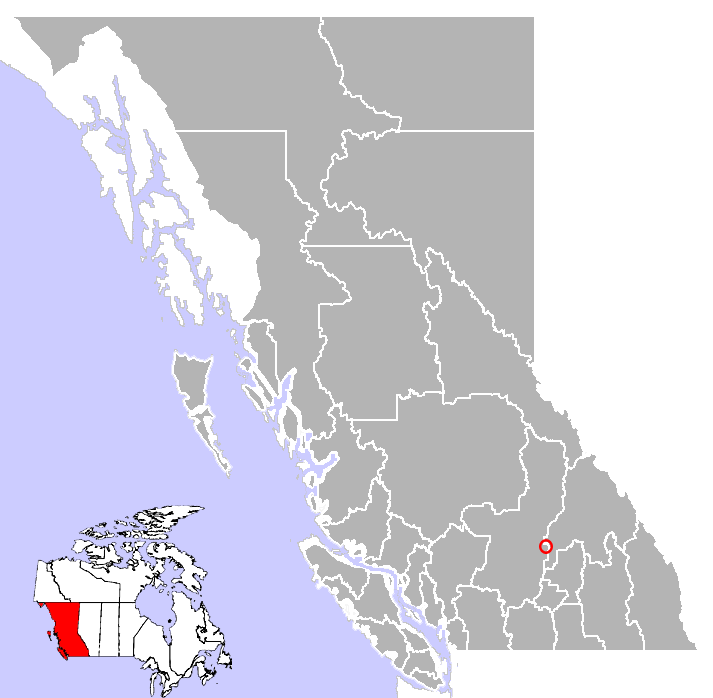
- Location of Chase in British Columbia
- Coordinates: 50°49′08″N 119°41′04″W
- Country: Canada
- Province: British Columbia
- Region: BC Interior
- Regional district: Thompson-Nicola
- Incorporated: April 21, 1969

Government
  - Governing body: Chase Village Council
  - Mayor: David Lepsoe

Area
  - Total: 3.05 km^{2} (1.18 sq mi)
  - Land: 3.77 km^{2} (1.46 sq mi)
- Elevation: 380 m (1,250 ft)

Population (2021)
  - Total: 2,399
  - Density: 639.3/km^{2} (1,656/sq mi)
- Time zone: UTC−07:00 (PT)
- Postal code span: V0E 1M0
- Area code: 250 / 778 / 236
- Highways: Highway 1 (TCH)
- Waterways: South Thompson River and Chase Creek
- Website: chasebc.ca

Chase is a village located in the Interior of British Columbia, Canada. It has a population of 2,399, and its main industries are forestry and tourism. It is located at the outlet of Little Shuswap Lake, which is the source of the South Thompson River. Chase Creek, which drops over three small waterfalls before flowing through the town, enters the South Thompson just below the lake's outlet.

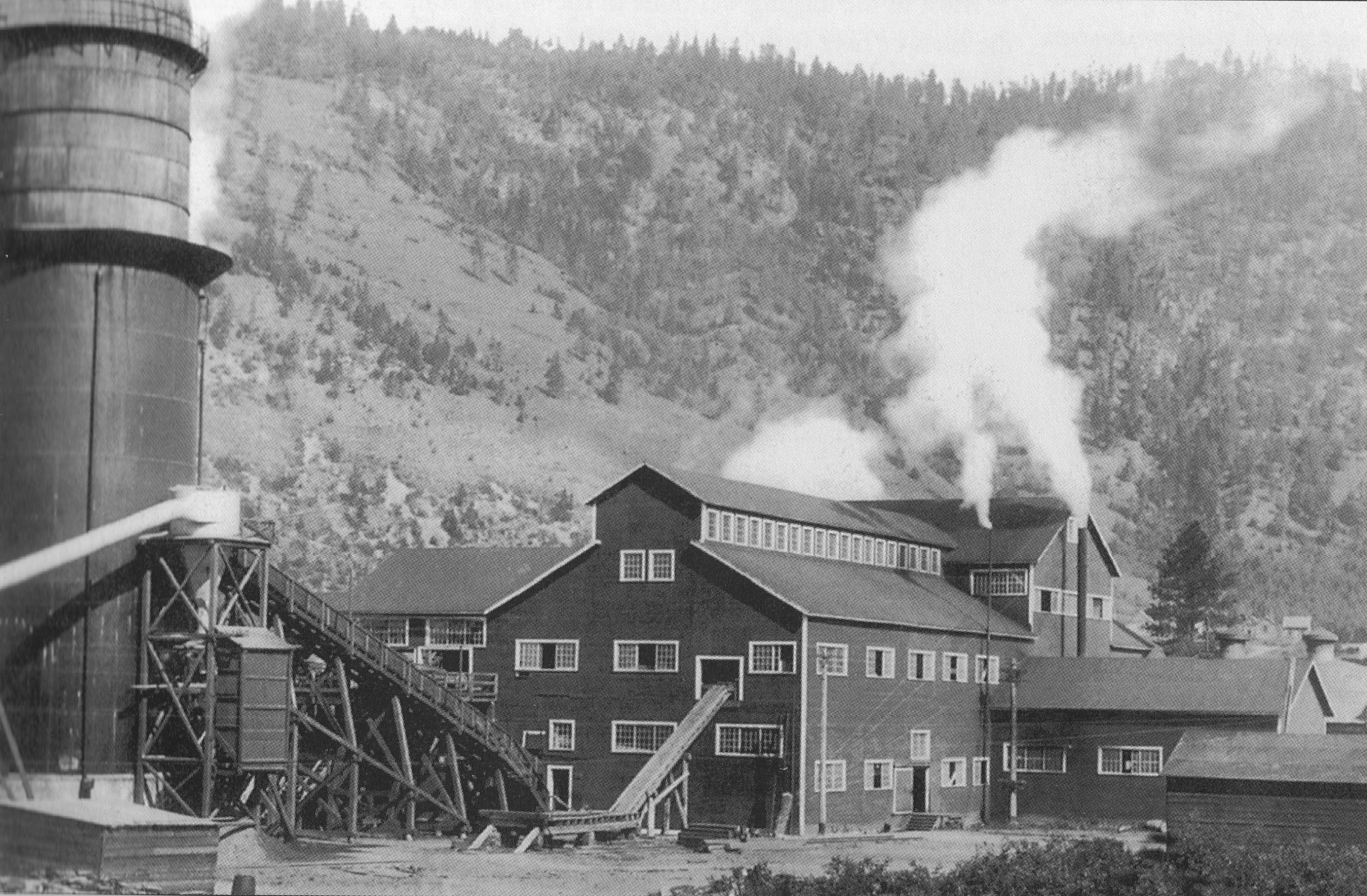
Adams River Lumber mill, 1919

Historical population
Year	Pop.	±%
1981	1,777	—
1986	1,933	+8.8%
1991	2,083	+7.8%
1996	2,460	+18.1%
2001	2,460	+0.0%
2006	2,409	−2.1%
2011	2,495	+3.6%
2016	2,286	−8.4%
2021	2,399	+4.9%

== Demographics ==
In the 2021 Census of Population conducted by Statistics Canada, Chase had a population of 2,399 living in 1,175 of its 1,249 total private dwellings, a change of 4.9% from its 2016 population of 2,286. With a land area of 3.75 km^{2} (1.45 sq mi), it had a population density of 639.7/km^{2} (1,656.9/sq mi) in 2021.

=== Religion ===
According to the 2021 census, religious groups in Chase included:

- Irreligion (1,465 persons or 61.6%)
- Christianity (880 persons or 37.0%)
- Buddhism (10 persons or 0.4%)
- Other (20 persons or 0.8%)

== Government and infrastructure ==
=== Fire department ===
The Village of Chase provides fire services to the community through the Village of Chase Fire Department.

=== Policing ===
A Royal Canadian Mounted Police detachment is located in Chase and serves the village, surrounding highways and First Nations communities.

=== Health care ===
The Village of Chase is served by the Chase and District Health Centre, part of the Interior Health Authority.

The BC Ambulance Service maintains a station in the community.

== Transportation ==
=== Roads ===
The Trans-Canada Highway runs adjacent to the south side of the community and provides access to the nearby regional centres of Kamloops (57 km [35 mi] west) and Salmon Arm (52 km [32 mi] east).

Other, minor routes connect Chase to Falkland and Barriere.

There has been a perennial proposal to construct a winterized road between Chase and nearby Sun Peaks to aid in the development of Chase's economy. The road would offer a shorter route for visitors arriving at the resort community from the east.

=== Railway ===
The Canadian Pacific Railway mainline travels through the community with through freight and passenger traffic.

=== Airports ===
The closest commercial airport is the Kamloops Airport. The Shuswap (Skwlax Field) Aerodrome was located on the northeast side of Little Shuswap Lake but is no longer active.

== Culture and recreation ==
The primary attraction for the Village of Chase is Little Shuswap Lake. Beaches, boat launches and a large pier provide access to the lake and South Thompson River.

The Sunshore Golf Club provides a nine-hole golf course.

Some Chase residents say "There are two seasons in Chase; Corn season, and waiting for corn season." The town is known for its fertile farm land, and celebrates the production and sharing of local food.

== Sport ==
Chase is home to the Chase Heat of the Kootenay International Junior Hockey League. It was the home of the Chase Chiefs of the same league, who existed from 2007 to 2010, before relocating to Kelowna.

== History ==
The town was named after one of the first settlers in the district, Whitfield Chase who established a ranch where the South Thompson River runs out of Little Shuswap Lake in 1865. When the Adams River Lumber Company laid out the town in 1902, James A. Magee, secretary of the company named the town for Chase.

== See also ==
- Little Shuswap Indian Band (Squilax)
