= Little River Township =

Little River Township may refer to:

== Arkansas ==
- Little River Township, Little River County, Arkansas, in Little River County, Arkansas
- Little River Township, Mississippi County, Arkansas, in Mississippi County, Arkansas
- Little River Township, Poinsett County, Arkansas, in Poinsett County, Arkansas

== Kansas ==
- Little River Township, Reno County, Kansas, in Reno County, Kansas

== Missouri ==
- Little River Township, Pemiscot County, Missouri

== North Carolina ==
- Little River Township, Alexander County, North Carolina, in Alexander County, North Carolina
- Little River Township, Caldwell County, North Carolina, in Caldwell County, North Carolina
- Little River Township, Montgomery County, North Carolina, in Montgomery County, North Carolina
- Little River Township, Orange County, North Carolina, in Orange County, North Carolina
- Little River Township, Transylvania County, North Carolina, in Transylvania County, North Carolina
- Little River Township, Wake County, North Carolina
