= Ruby (disambiguation) =

A ruby is a red gemstone.

Ruby may also refer to:

== Places ==
- Ruby, Alaska
- Ruby, Arizona
- Ruby, Michigan
- Ruby, Copiah County, Mississippi
- Ruby, Leflore County, Mississippi
- Ruby, Nebraska
- Ruby, New York
- Ruby, South Carolina
- Ruby, United States Virgin Islands
- Ruby, Virginia
- Ruby, Washington, a ghost town
- Ruby, Wisconsin, a town
- The Ruby (space), Mission District, San Francisco, California
- Ruby Beach, Washington
- Ruby Canyon, on the Colorado-Utah border
- Ruby Creek (disambiguation), several creeks in North America
- Ruby Falls, an underground waterfall within Lookout Mountain, Tennessee
- Ruby Mountain, a stratovolcano in British Columbia, Canada
- Ruby Mountains, a mountain range in Nevada
  - Ruby Dome, the highest peak of the Ruby Mountains
- Ruby Ridge, Idaho, site of a violent confrontation and siege
- Ruby Valley, Nevada
- Ruby City (disambiguation), several US ghost towns

== Arts and entertainment ==
=== Fictional entities ===
- Ruby (given name) § Fictional characters
- The Ruby, a coffee shop / diner in the Canadian television series Corner Gas (and its various adaptations to other media)
- Ruby the Galactic Gumshoe, a radio program produced by ZBS Foundation

=== Film and television ===
- Ruby (1977 film), a supernatural horror
- Ruby (1992 film), about Jack Ruby
- Ruby (actress) (born 1972), American pornographic actress
- Ruby (talk show), a British late night talk show
- Ruby (2008 TV series), a Style Network program
- Ruby (2012 TV series), an Arab dramatic series

=== Music ===
==== Albums ====
- Ruby (The Killjoys album), 1990
- Ruby (Macy Gray album), 2018
- Ruby (Ruby album), 1976
- Ruby (Sirsy album), 2004
- Ruby (Archie Roach, Ruby Hunter, Paul Grabowsky and Australian Art Orchestra album), 2005
- Ruby (Jennie album), 2025
- The Ruby, an EP by April, 2018

==== Songs ====
- "Ruby" (Ruby Gentry theme), from the 1952 film Ruby Gentry, also performed by Ray Charles in 1960
- "Ruby" (Kaiser Chiefs song), 2007 single by Kaiser Chiefs, from the album Yours Truly, Angry Mob
- "Ruby", a song by Boyzone, from Brother (2010)
- "Ruby", a song by Camille, from Le Sac des Filles (2002)
- "Ruby", a song by Janis Ian, from Revenge (1995)
- "Ruby", a song by Kristin Hersh, from Sunny Border Blue (2001)
- "Ruby", a song by Queenadreena, from Djin (2008)
- "Ruby", a song by Twenty One Pilots, from Regional at Best (2011)
- "Ruby" and Ruby, a 2022 song and mixtape by Woozi
- "Ruby, My Dear" (composition), a song by Thelonious Monk, composed c. 1945, recorded 1947
- "Ruby: Sad Tear" (Korean: 루비: 슬픈눈물), a song by Fin.K.L, from Blue Rain (1998)

==== Artists and record labels ====
- Ruby (British band), an alternative group formed in 1994
- Ruby & the Romantics, an American R&B group
- Ruby Records, a record label
- Ruby (American band), an American rock band featuring Tom Fogerty
- Ruby (Egyptian singer) (born 1981), singer and actress
- Ruby, a performer in the English hip pop quintet King
- Ruby Frost, New Zealand singer

=== Other uses in arts and media ===
- Pokémon Ruby, a video game released in 2002 for Japan and 2003 internationally
  - Pokémon Omega Ruby, a remake of Pokémon Ruby
- Ruby (novel), a 1994 fiction book by V. C. Andrews in The Landry Family Series
- Ruby, a vocaloid

== Computing ==
- Ruby (hardware description language)
- Ruby (programming language)
- Ruby, an early development name for Visual Basic (classic)
- Ruby MRI, the C reference implementation of the Ruby language

== Transportation and military ==
=== Ships ===
- HMS Ruby, several vessels of the Royal Navy
- PS Ruby, several paddle steamers
- USS Ruby (PY-21), a converted yacht in service with the US Navy
- Ruby (ship), several merchant ships

=== Other uses in transportation and military ===
- Ruby (car), an inter-war French manufacturer of light cars and proprietary engines
- Project Ruby, a 1946 joint Anglo-American program to test a range of bunker-buster bombs

== Food, plants, and animals ==
- Ruby Tuesday (restaurant), an American international foodservice chain
- Ruby chocolate, a kind of pink/purple cacao product
- Ruby (mango), a bright red mango cultivar from south Florida
- 'Ruby Red' and 'Star Ruby', varieties of grapefruit
- Ruby leaf, a common name of Alternanthera brasiliana, in family Amaranthaceae
  - Little ruby, a common name of Alternanthera brasiliana var. villosa
- Brazilian ruby, Clytolaema rubricauda, a species of hummingbird
- Ruby (elephant), 1973–1998
- Daiichi Ruby, a Japanese Thoroughbred racehorse

== Other uses ==
- Ruby (given name)
- Ruby (surname)
- Ruby (annotation), small-print pronunciation guide for logographic writing
- Ruby (typography), the British English name for agate-size type
- Ruby (color), a color based on that of the gemstone
- Rubies (Super Fours), a women's cricket team that competed in the Super Fours
- Ruby Corp., the parent company of the Ashley Madison online dating service
- J. W. Ruby Memorial Hospital, or Ruby, in Morgantown, West Virginia
- List of storms named Ruby

== See also ==
- Rubygate, a sex scandal involving Silvio Berlusconi
- Ruby pistol
- Rubi (disambiguation)
- Rubin (disambiguation)
- Rubis (rocket), a rocket system
- RWBY, an animated web series
- Ruby Rose (disambiguation)
