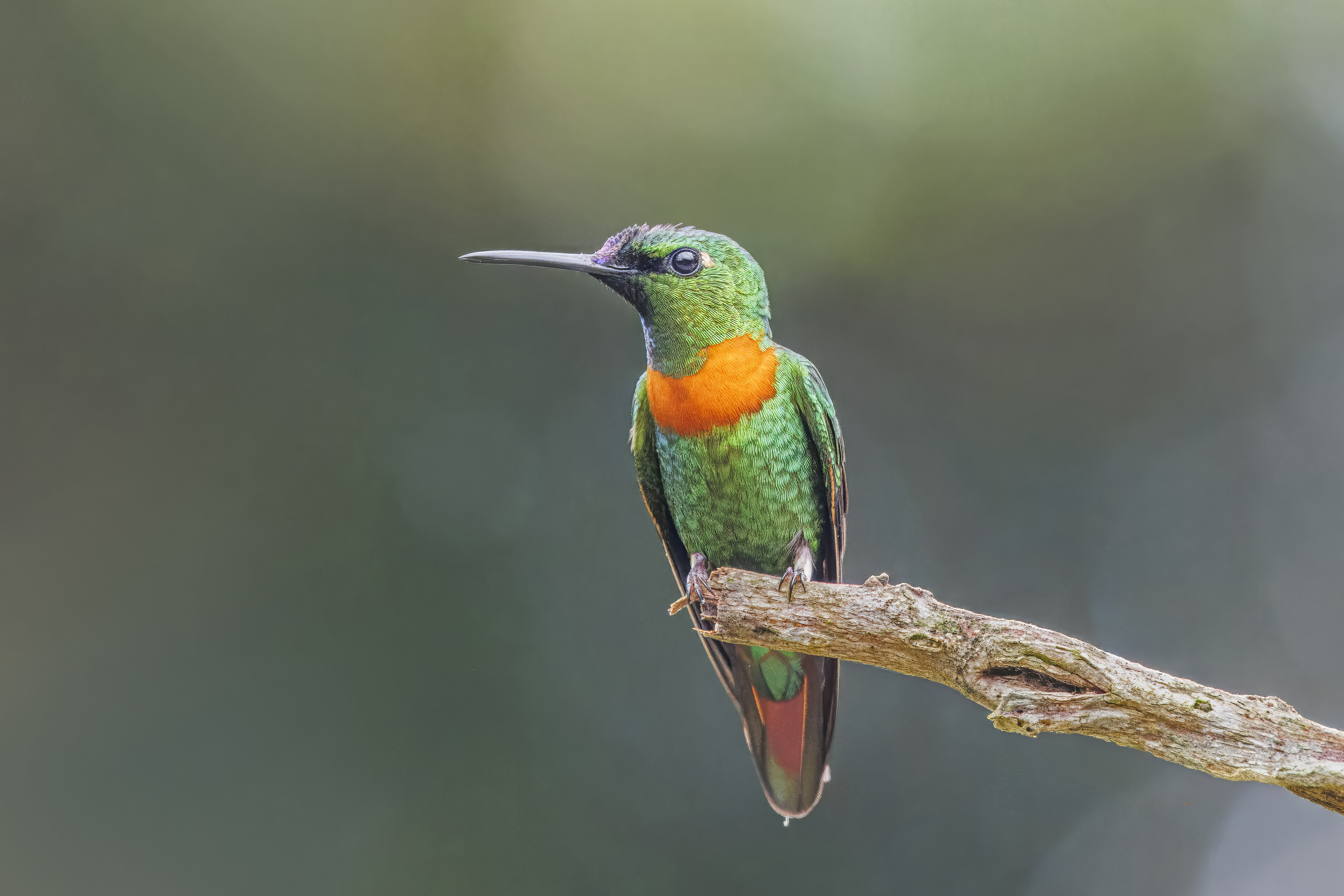

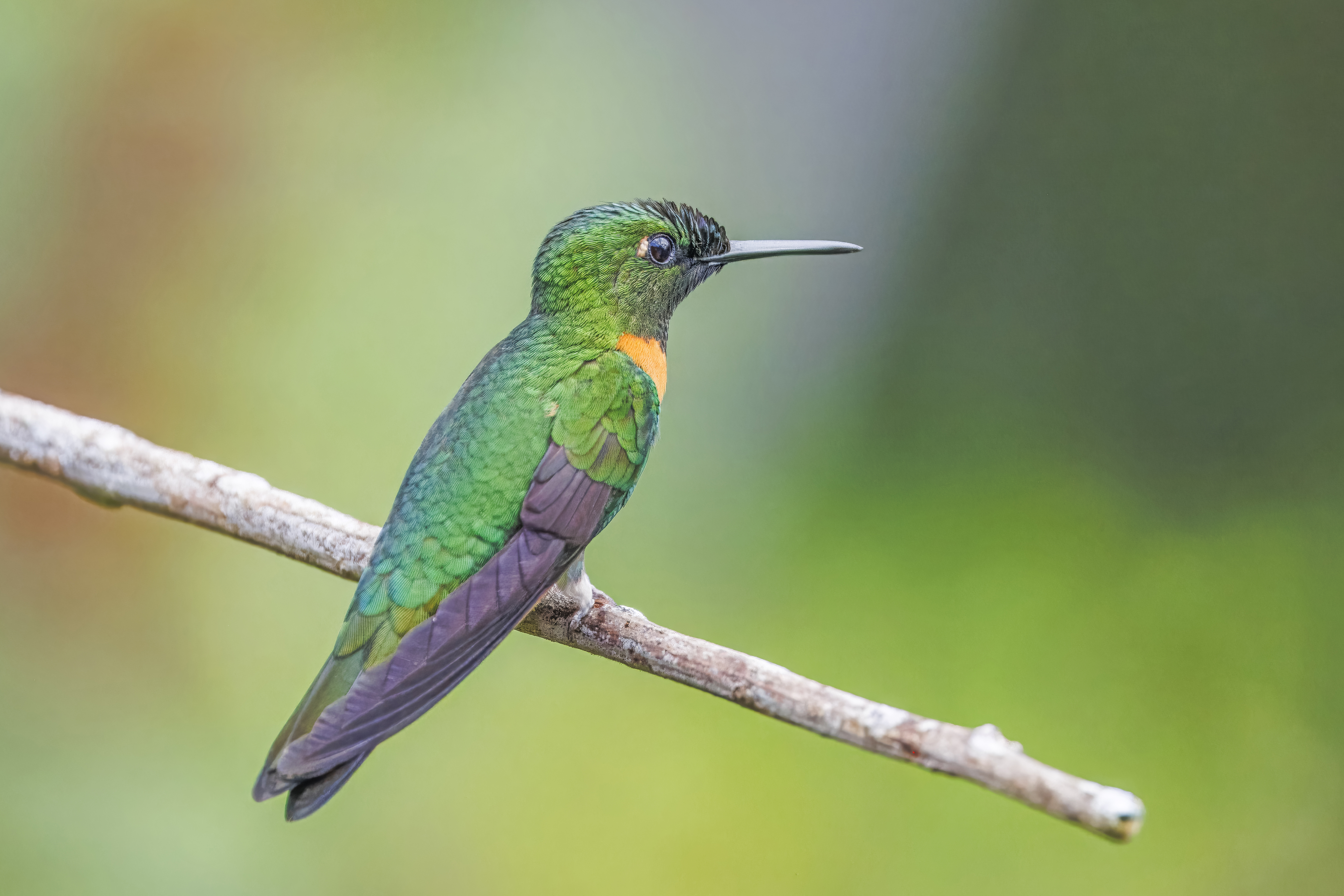
- Both males, in Ecuador

Conservation status
- Least Concern (IUCN 3.1)
- CITES Appendix II

Scientific classification
- Kingdom: Animalia
- Phylum: Chordata
- Class: Aves
- Order: Apodiformes
- Family: Trochilidae
- Genus: Heliodoxa
- Species: H. aurescens

Binomial name
- Heliodoxa aurescens (Gould, 1846)

= Gould's jewelfront =

Species of bird

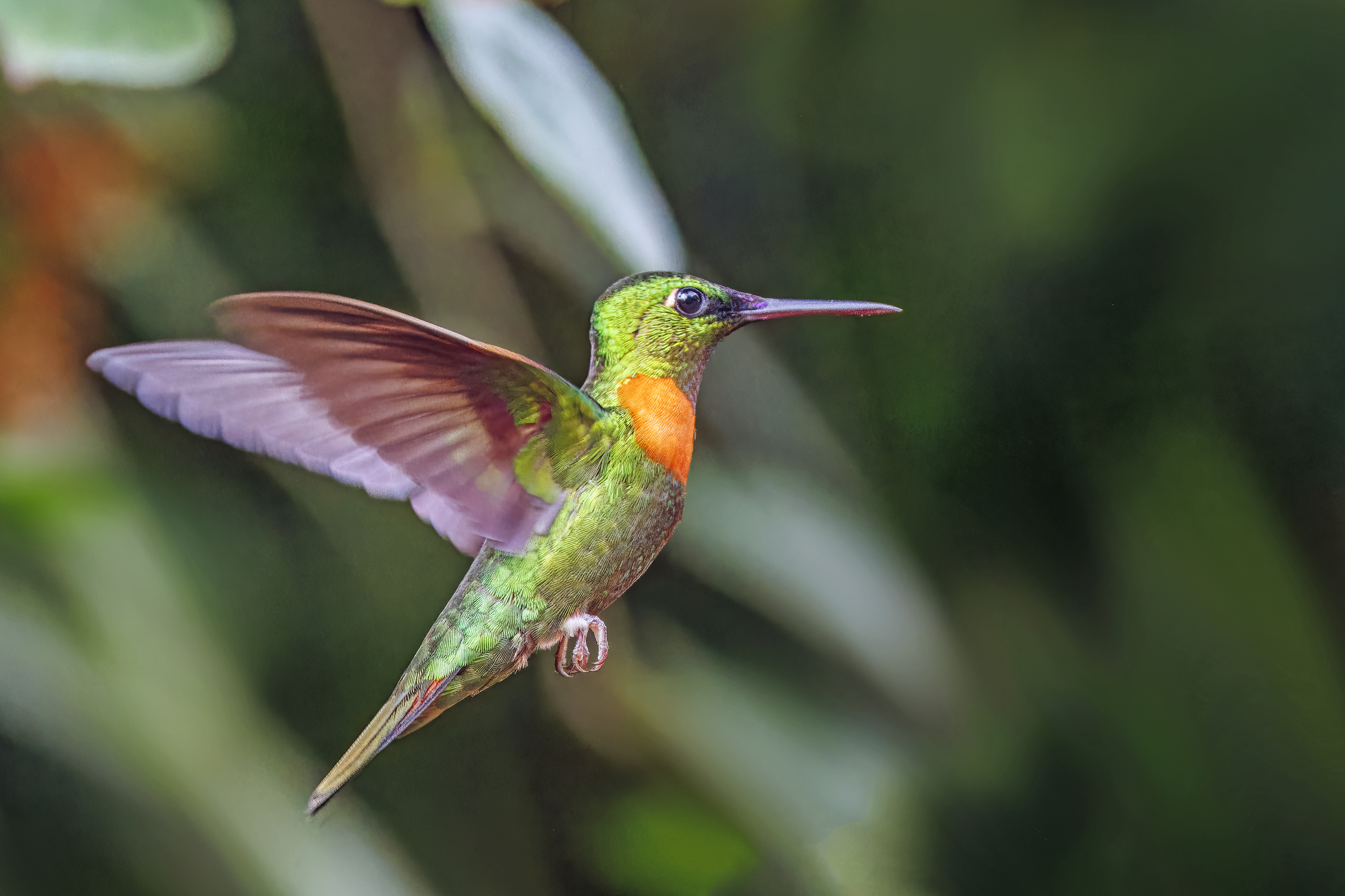

Gould's jewelfront or Gould's brilliant (Heliodoxa aurescens) is a medium-sized hummingbird in the family Trochilidae. It is found in tropical and equatorial South America. This is an uncommon species with an unusually large range compared to the other members of Heliodoxa.

The common name commemorates the English ornithologist and bird artist John Gould (1804–1881).

== Description ==
H.aurescens ranges in size from 11 to 12 cm, with an average weight of about 6.2 g. This is a sexually dimorphic species with minor differences in plumage and bill lengths between sexes. Both sexes have a narrow frontlet of glittering purplish-blue which is underdeveloped in immature individuals. The bill, black to dark coloured is "unspecialised" being relatively short and straight; while the irises are brown and tarsus black. The tail is forked with the central pair of feathers bronze-green while the other tail feathers have chestnut edges and bronze-green tips. Undertail coverts are a deep fawn colour and wings are purplish-brown. It is noted that there is some variation in plumage for this species, but these differences do not relate to location and is minimal when considering the wide range.

Specimens examined by Peter Cotton had an average wing length of 60.5 mm and exposed culmen length of 18.5 mm. Gould's original specimen had a bill of 2.5 cm and tail length of 31.75 mm. The average c-value of the genome is 1.1135 pg based on four specimens ranging from 1.045–1.162 pg.

Males have shining grass green upperparts with the sides of the neck and lower throat glittering golden green bordered by a distinctive orange/rufous breast band. The chin, lores and upper throat are velvety black while the rest of the underparts are shining green. Females appear generally similar to the male but are somewhat duller coloured and have a green crown. They have a slightly larger bill than the male (with a Lovich-Gibbons ratio of 0.030). The chin feathers have buff tips and the throat is greyish with green discs. Females also feature a malar stripe (from the base of the bill towards the neck) which is buff to chestnut coloured.

== Systematics and taxonomy ==
Heliodoxa aurescens is one of nine species in the genus Heliodoxa (the "Brilliants"). It was first described by John Gould in 1846 who named it Trochilus aurescens. It was later placed in the monotypic genus Polyplancta, however this was challenged as early as 1951 by Zimmer who suggested that it belonged in Heliodoxa. Some ornithologists thought it to be closely related to the Brazilian ruby (Heliodoxa rubricauda) and sometimes placed it in Clytolaema. Due to the absence of any synapomorphies in either grouping, it remained in Polyplancta until 1989 when morphological data indicated the species is embedded in Heliodoxa; a finding confirmed by subsequent research. These studies indicate it is closely related to the Black-throated brilliant (H.schreibersii), and may have evolved in parapatry to the Velvet-browed brilliant (H.xanthogonys).

== Distribution ==
The exact distribution of H.aurescens is not known, but considered unusual since the other members of the genus have very narrow or restricted ranges, often at higher elevations in the Andes. It is widely distributed at elevations from 250 m to 1150 m and has been reported at elevations as high as 1450 m. The northern boundary of the range is in southern Venezuela, which continues south through central Ecuador and Peru. The southern boundary is located in Bolivia. It occupies a large area of north-western Brazil where the eastern boundary of the range is found in the State of Para.

There have been several incidents of range expansion since the species was first described. Gould suggested the range was probably east of the Andes in Ecuador, Peru, and Brazil (in Zimmer). The Venezuelan population was first encountered in 1941. At this time, the southern boundary was considered to be La Pampa in Peru but H.aurescens was detected in Bolivia in 1984 and in the Brazilian state of Mato Grosso in 2004. Otherwise the species is considered sedentary.

== Habitat ==
H.aurescens is typically found in the understorey of lowland humid tropical forests, particularly near streams, and only rarely at forest edges. In Brazil it has been observed in tall forest impacted by logging, seen feeding at flowers in the canopy of "a small patch of semi-deciduous forest surrounded by terra firme". Cotton observed it in both varzea forest and terra firme but not in riverine vegetation. Another Brazilian study found them in terra firme in both the wet and dry seasons but in várzea only during the dry season.

In a one-year survey in Columbia H.aurescens was found only in old secondary growth and never in young secondary growth or undisturbed understory; but was observed in primary forest in a later survey. It has been found both in mature floodplain forest and terra firme in Peru.

== Diet ==
Like most hummingbirds, H.aurescens is primarily nectarivous supplementing the diet with small arthropods hawked from the air. Little is known about the specific diet but they have been observed feeding on Bromeliads such as Bromelia balansae and Costus sp. in Brazil. 53% of specimens examined in 1986 had traces of arthropods in the gut. While typically a generalist understorey species, they have been observed feeding from flowers in tall trees; and visiting feeding stations in Ecuador, where they showed some aggression towards other birds in the area. An extensive study on feeding guilds in Brazilian hummingbirds indicated that H.aurescens was not generally territorial but they were omitted from the analysis of food plant use due to there being too few observations, with only three specimens netted in a two-year survey.

== Reproduction ==
Very little is known of the reproductive biology. Breeding is thought to occur between June and September with a clutch of two eggs incubated by the female. Two descriptions of female specimens indicate their gonads are well developed in February and April; but a single male specimen obtained in February had "small" gonads.

== Conservation status ==
H.aurescens is classified as Least Concern by the IUCN. There are suggestions the species is in decline but not at a rate which warrants classification as endangered. Numerous studies indicate the species is present but uncommon, with many long term studies only producing small numbers of observations (E.G. Cotton 1998, Lees et al., 2013) A density of 1 individual per 100 hectares was determined in Peru when only one individual was observed in a 100 Ha study site in a three-month survey.
