= Ruby Creek =

Ruby Creek may refer to:

Canada

- Ruby Creek (Fraser River tributary), in British Columbia
- Ruby Creek (Lake Surprise), a tributary in the Atlin Country region of British Columbia
- Ruby Creek, British Columbia, a locality on the Fraser River
- Ruby Creek Indian Reserve No. 2, in British Columbia

United States

- Ruby Creek (Michigan), a tributary of the Pere Marquette river
- Ruby Creek (Montana), a stream in Flathead County, Montana
- Ruby Creek (South Dakota)
- Ruby Creek (Washington), a tributary of the Skagit River
