= Rubis =

Rubis is the French word for ruby.

Rubis may refer to:

- French ship Rubis, various ships of the French Navy
- Rubis-class submarine, a French Navy nuclear attack submarine class
- Rubis (rocket), a French two-stage rocket
- Scintex Rubis, a French 1960s aircraft
- Rubis (company), a French-based storage and distribution company

== See also ==
- Rubes, a syndicated newspaper cartoon
- Rubes (surname), a list of people
- Riverside Rubes, a minor league baseball team (1941, 1947–1950)
- Providence Rubes, a baseball team in 1926
