= Ruby (ship) =

Several vessels have been named Ruby:

- Ruby was a ship of 700 tons burthen that made one voyage for the British East India Company (EIC)
- Ruby (or Ruby Frigate) was a brig of 80 tons burthen that the EIC took up in 1686 and sent out to India with dispatches to remain there for the local trade.
- Ruby was a French privateer that HMS Ruby captured in 1695 and that the British Royal Navy named HMS Ruby Prize and sold in 1698. Her new owners renamed her Ruby and she left the Downs in 1699 on a voyage to Persia for the EIC; she was lost with all hands later that year at Mayota.
- Ruby (1758 ship) was a ship that in 1758 transported Acadians to Europe and that wrecked towards the end of her voyage with great loss of life.
- Ruby (1800 ship) was a ship launched at Calcutta in 1800 that made one voyage for the EIC and that was lost in 1812.
- Ruby was launched as Maria at Howrah in 1804. She was captured in 1807 and became Derreah Reggie, with Arab owners. She returned to British ownership and was renamed Ruby. She foundered near the Seychelles on 22 April 1838.
- Ruby (HBC vessel), was a ship chartered by the Hudson's Bay Company from 1914–1923, see Hudson's Bay Company vessels

== See also ==
- HMS Ruby, several vessels of the British Royal Navy with the name Ruby
- PS Ruby, several paddle steamers
- USS Ruby (PY-21)
