= Rubess =

Rubess is a Latvian surname. Notable people with the surname include:

- Baņuta Rubess (born 1956), Canadian playwright, director, and theatre professor
- Bruno Rubess (1926–2009), Latvian businessman

== See also ==
- Rubes (surname)
