= Ruby (comics) =

Ruby, in comics, may refer to:

- Ruby, a character in Dark Horse Comics' Catalyst: Agents of Change
- Ruby Thursday, a Marvel Comics supervillain

== See also ==
- Ruby (disambiguation)
