= Ruby and sapphire =

Ruby and sapphire may refer to:

- Corundum, a class of gems including both rubies and sapphires
- Pokémon Ruby and Sapphire, a pair of 2002 video games
- Garnet, a fictional character from Steven Universe, formed by the fusion of Ruby and Sapphire
- Ruby & Sapphire, a 1997 book (and updated editions) by gemologist Richard W. Hughes

== See also ==
- Pokémon Omega Ruby and Alpha Sapphire
- Ruby (disambiguation)
- Sapphire (disambiguation)
