= Rubi =

Rubí or Rubi may refer to:

== Television ==
- Rubí (cartoon), on Maha Cartoon TV
- Rubí (1968 TV series), a 1968 Mexican telenovela
  - Rubí (2004 TV series), a 2004 Mexican remake of the original 1968 telenovela
  - Ruby (2012 TV series), a 2012 Arabic television remake
  - Rubi (Philippine TV series), a 2010 Philippine television remake
  - Rubí (American TV series), a 2020 American television remake
- Rubí rebelde, a Venezuelan telenovela, based on a novel by Inés Rodena

== Places ==
- Font-rubí, Spanish municipality in the comarca of the province of Barcelona
- Rubí, Barcelona, Spanish municipality of the province of Barcelona
- Rubí de Bracamonte, Spanish municipality of the province of Valladolid
- Rubi River, left tributary of the Itimbiri River, Democratic Republic of the Congo
- Rubi Valley Rural Municipality, Nepalese rural municipality

== People ==
- Adorable Rubí (1931–2012), Mexican Luchador
- Fred Rubi (1926–1997), Swiss alpine skier
- Mel Rubi, American artist
- Rubí Cerioni (1927–2012), Argentine footballer
- Rubi Dalma (1906–1994), Italian actress
- Rubi (footballer) (born 1970), Spanish footballer and manager
- Marqués de Rubí (c.1725-?) Spanish inspector of presidios in northern New Spain
- Rubi Noor (1945–2008), Indian politician
- Rubi Ocean, Brazilian drag queen
- Rubi Rose (born 1998), American rapper and model
- Rubí Rodríguez, Chilean mathematician
- Rubí Sanz Gamo, Spanish historian
- Rubí Soto (born 1995), Mexican professional footballer
- Vicente Rubi (1903–1980), Filipino Visayan musician

== Other uses ==
- Rubi character, in the writing systems of East Asia
- Rubi (plural), members of the plant genus Rubus (brambles); not to be confused with Rubia (madders)
- Callophrys rubi, the green hairstreak butterfly

== See also ==
- Ruby (disambiguation)
