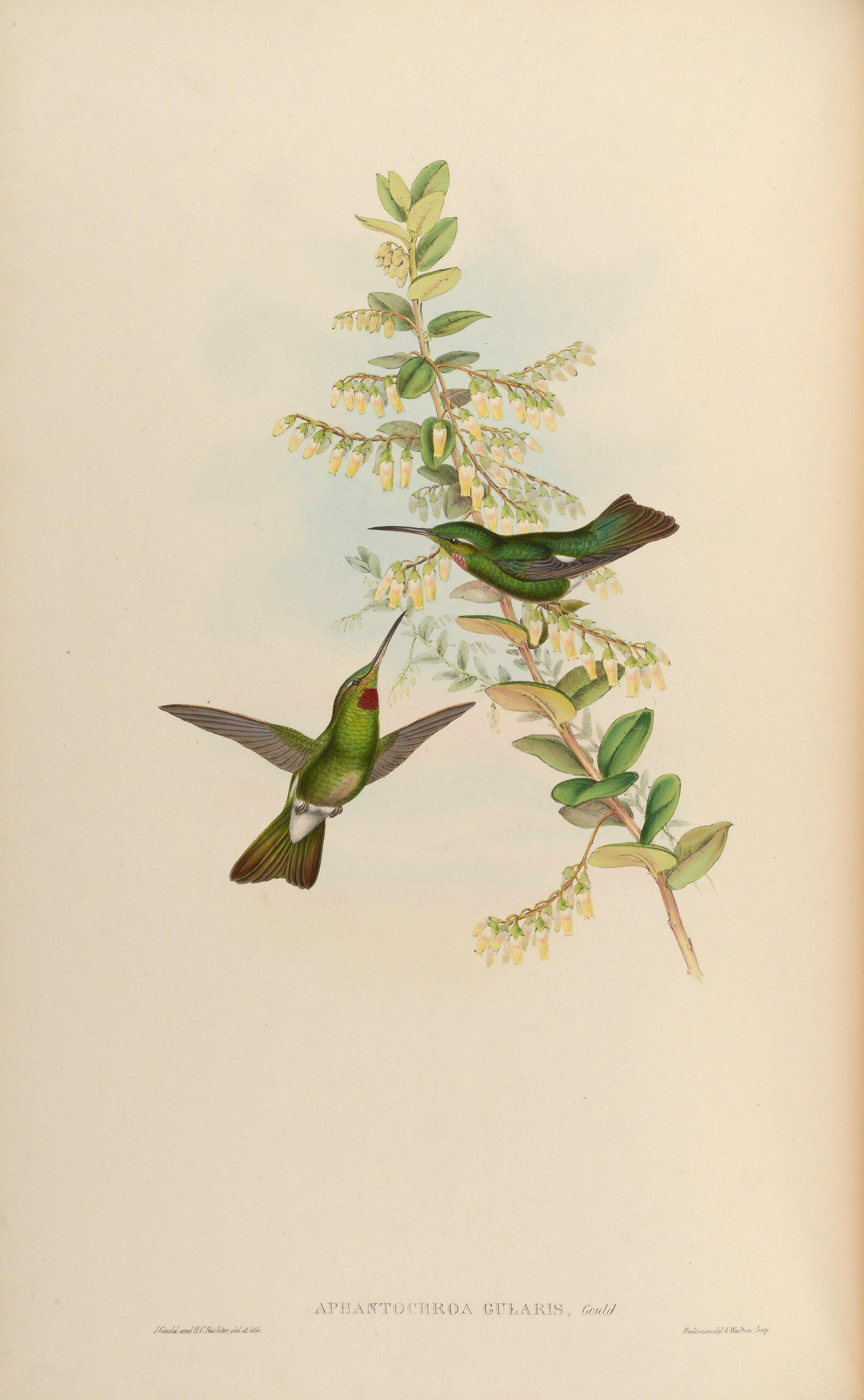

Conservation status
- Least Concern (IUCN 3.1)
- CITES Appendix II

Scientific classification
- Kingdom: Animalia
- Phylum: Chordata
- Class: Aves
- Order: Apodiformes
- Family: Trochilidae
- Genus: Heliodoxa
- Species: H. gularis

Binomial name
- Heliodoxa gularis (Gould, 1860)

= Pink-throated brilliant =

Species of hummingbird

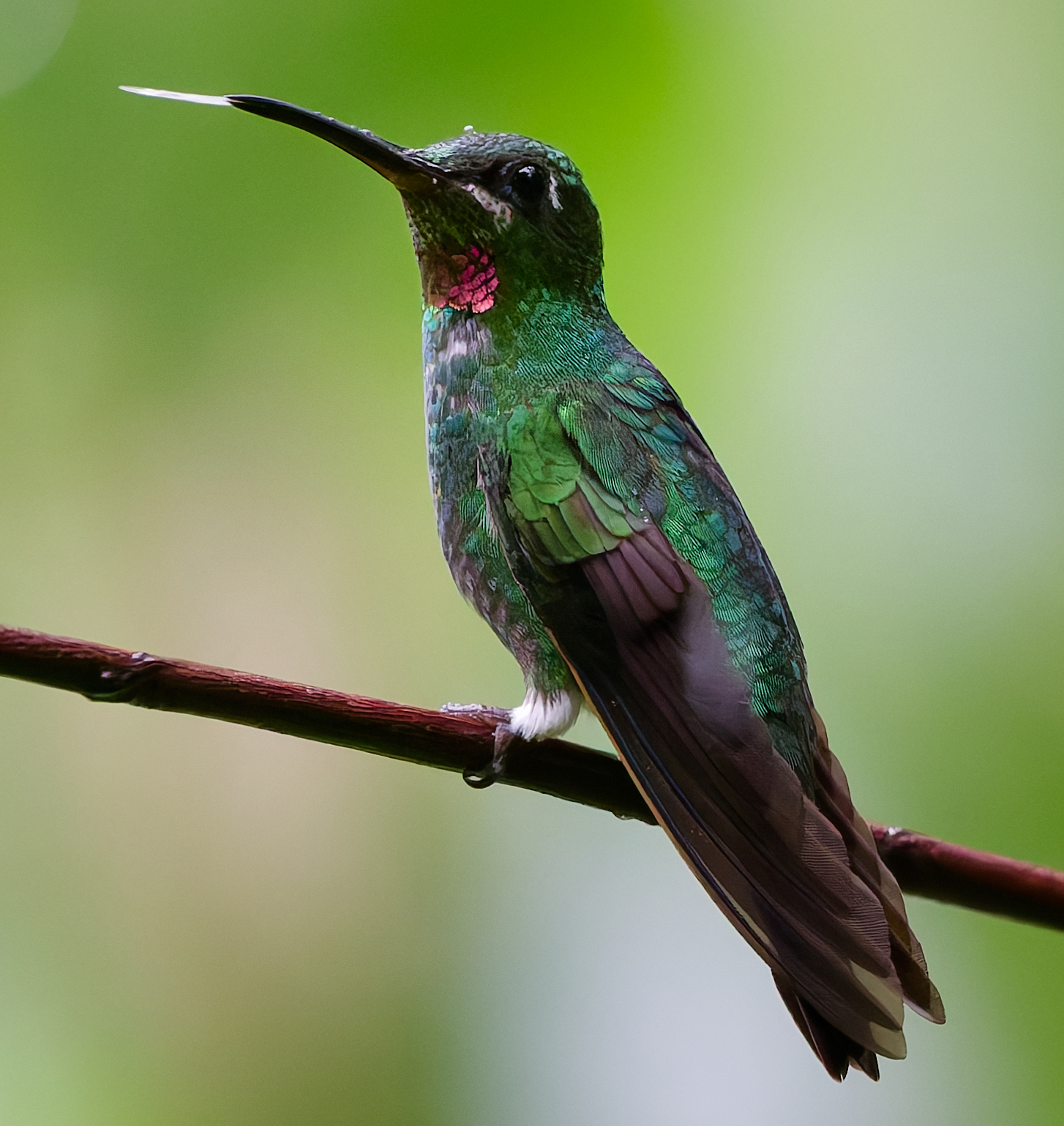
Pink-throated Brilliant

The pink-throated brilliant (Heliodoxa gularis) is a species of hummingbird in the "brilliants", tribe Heliantheini in subfamily Lesbiinae. It is found in Colombia, Ecuador, and Peru.

== Taxonomy and systematics ==
The pink-throated brilliant was at times treated as the sole member of genus Agapetornis and then Agapeta. In the mid 20th century Agapeta was merged into the present genus Heliodoxa. The species is monotypic.

== Description ==
The pink-throated brilliant is about 11 to 12 cm (4.3 to 4.7 in) long. The sexes are essentially identical. Both have the eponymous glittering pinkish red throat patch, though the female's is smaller. They have an almost straight black bill, a white spot behind the eye, and shining green upperparts with an iridescent green stripe in the middle of the forehead. The breast is shining green, the belly gray, and the undertail coverts whitish. The tail is long, forked, and bronzy green.

== Distribution and habitat ==
The pink-throated brilliant is mostly found from the southern end of Colombia's Eastern Andes into Ecuador as far as Sucumbíos and Napo provinces. There are also a few records in northeastern Peru. It inhabits humid montane forest at elevations between 250 and 1,050 m (820 and 3,400 ft).

== Behavior ==
=== Movement ===
The pink-throated brilliant is believed to be sedentary.

=== Feeding ===
The pink-throated brilliant has been documented feeding at the flowers of Psittacanthus and other members of family Loranthaceae. It also feeds on insects.

=== Breeding ===
Almost nothing is known about the pink-throated brilliant's breeding phenology.

=== Vocalization ===
What is thought to be the pink-throated brilliant's song is "a repeated nasal 'keuw'...also given as a single note in flight and while feeding."

== Status ==
The IUCN assesses the pink-throated brilliant as least concern. Its forest habitat continues to be cleared for agriculture, ranching, mining, and logging. It does occur in a few protected areas in Colombia but none in Ecuador.
