= Ruby Rose (disambiguation) =

Ruby Rose (born Ruby Rose Langenheim in 1986) is an Australian model and actress.

Ruby Rose may refer to:

== People ==
- Ruby Rose Aldridge (born 1991), U.S. fashion model and actress
- Ruby Rose Barrameda-Jimenez (died 2007), Filipino murder victim
- Ruby Rose Fox, U.S. musician, honored at the New England Music Awards
- Ruby Rose Neri (born 1970), U.S. artist
- Ruby Rose Roba, former owner of the Roba Ranch
- Ruby Rose Turner, (born 2005), U.S. actress

== Fictional characters ==
- Ruby Rose (RWBY), protagonist of the animated web series RWBY
- Ruby Rose, the main character of Australian film The Tale of Ruby Rose (1988)

== Other uses ==
- Ruby Rose, a sub-order of the occult organization Hermetic Order of the Golden Dawn

== See also ==
- Pink ruby (rose ruby), a rose-colored precious stone, a ruby
- Rubi Rose (born 1997), American rapper, songwriter and model
- Ruby (disambiguation)
- Rose (disambiguation)
