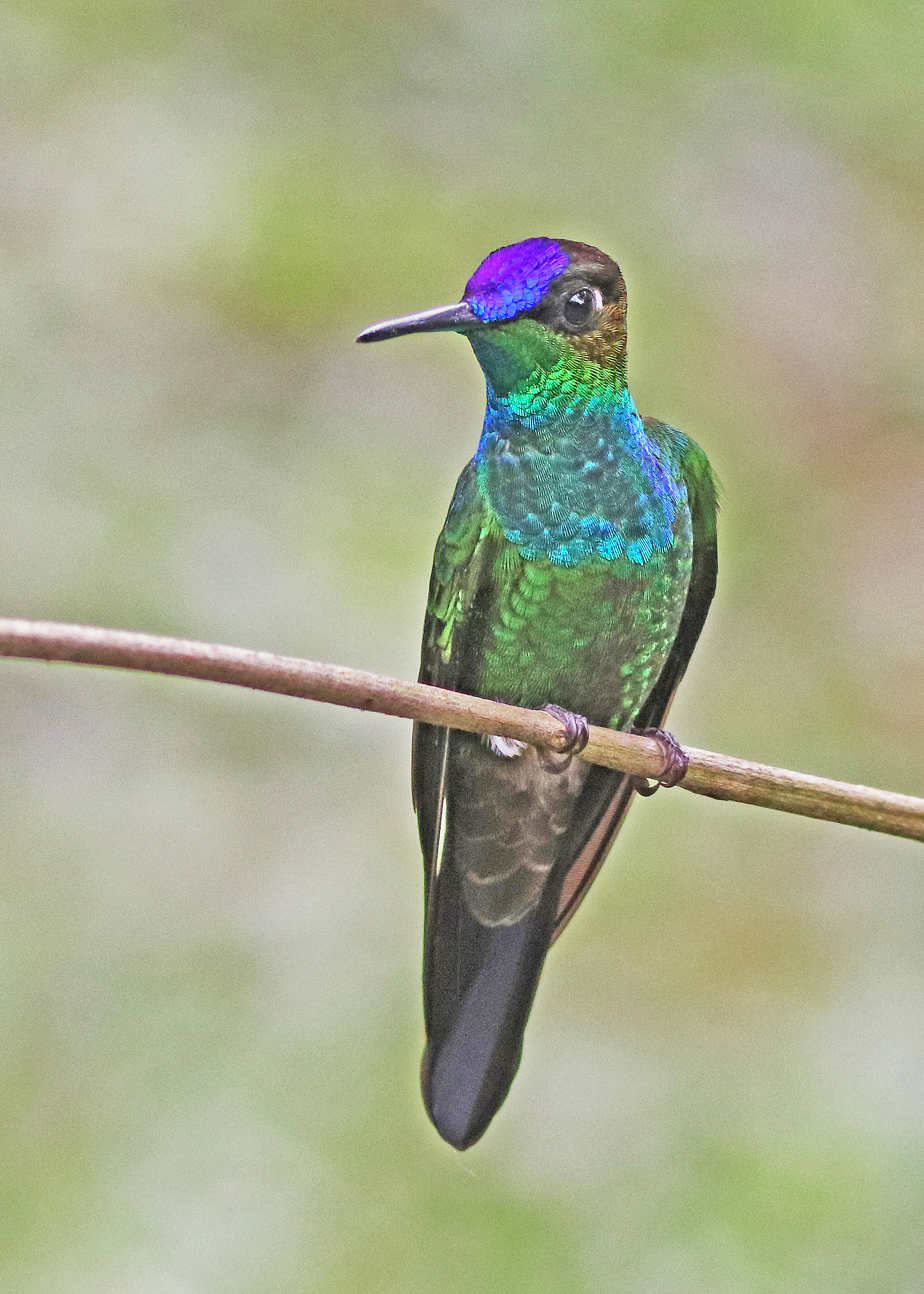
- male in eastern Ecuador
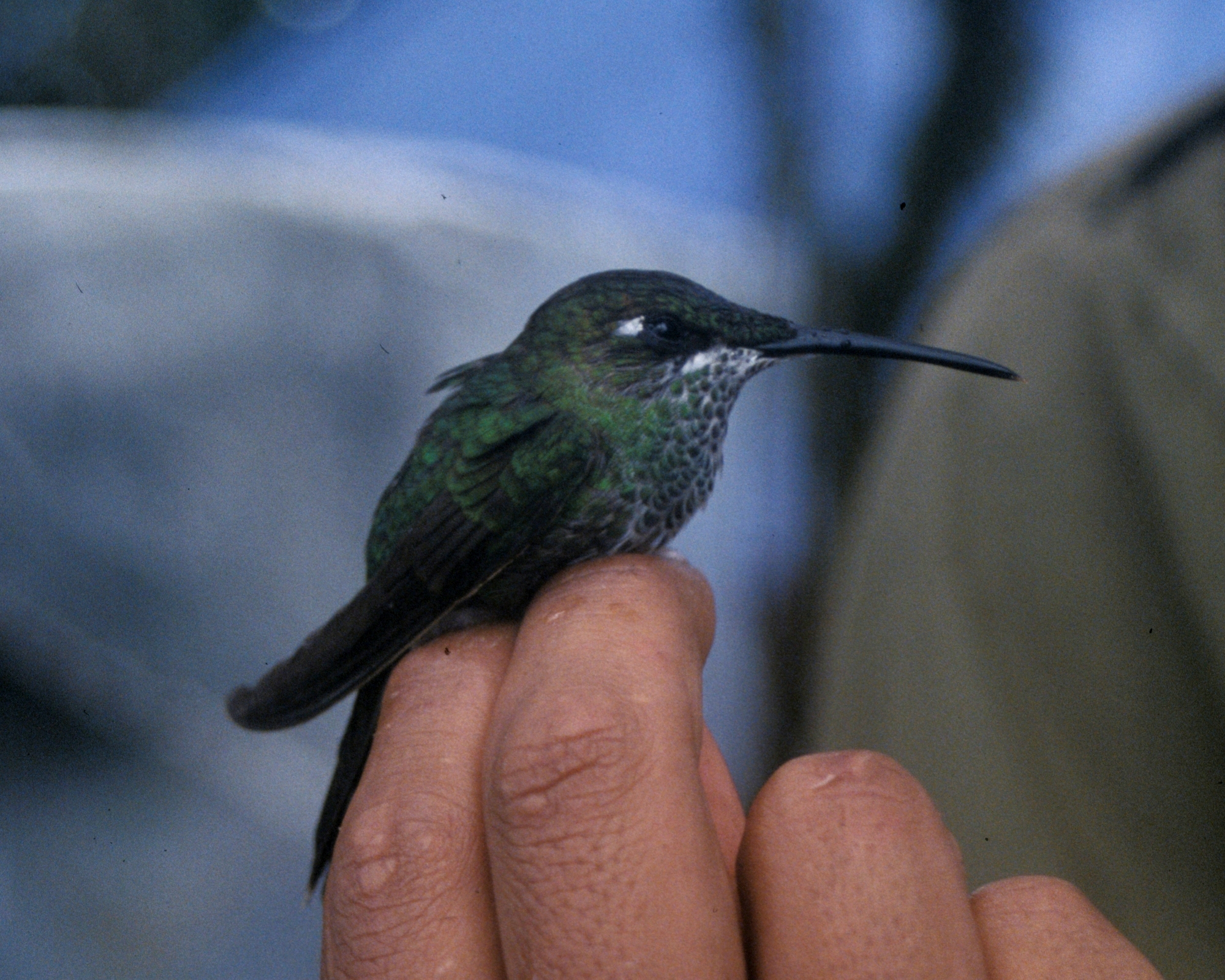
- female from Cordillera del Cóndor, Ecuador.

Conservation status
- Least Concern (IUCN 3.1)
- CITES Appendix II

Scientific classification
- Kingdom: Animalia
- Phylum: Chordata
- Class: Aves
- Order: Apodiformes
- Family: Trochilidae
- Genus: Heliodoxa
- Species: H. leadbeateri

Binomial name
- Heliodoxa leadbeateri (Bourcier, 1843)

= Violet-fronted brilliant =

Species of hummingbird

The violet-fronted brilliant (Heliodoxa leadbeateri) is a species of hummingbird in the "brilliants", tribe Heliantheini in subfamily Lesbiinae. It is found in Bolivia, Colombia, Ecuador, Peru, and Venezuela.

== Taxonomy and systematics ==
The violet-fronted brilliant has four subspecies:

- H. l. leadbeateri Bourcier (1843)
- H. l. parvula Berlepsch (1888)
- H. l. sagitta Reichenbach (1854)
- H. l. otero Tschudi (1844)

== Description ==
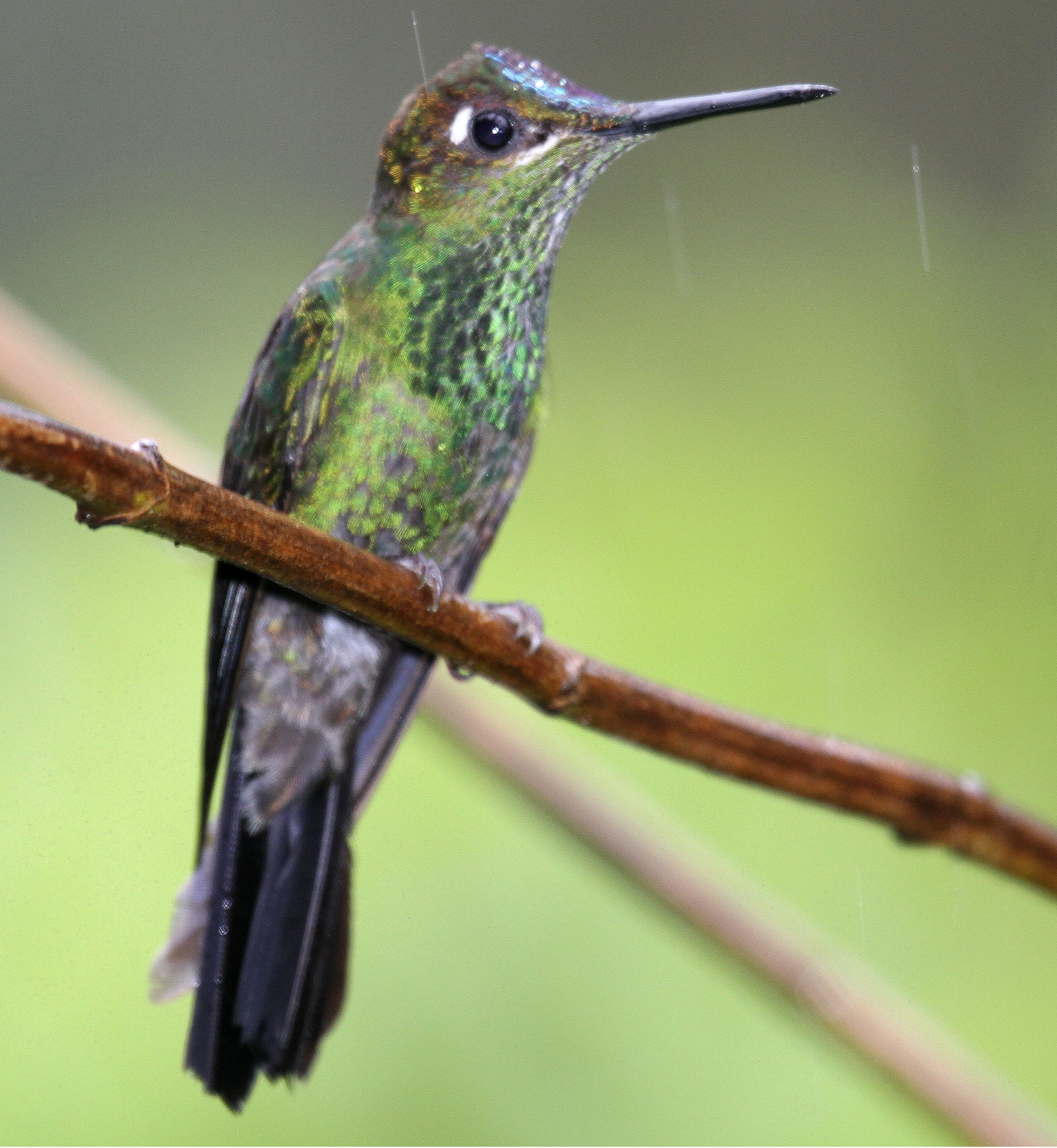
Male H. l. otero - Cock-of-the Rock Lodge, Peru (flash photo)

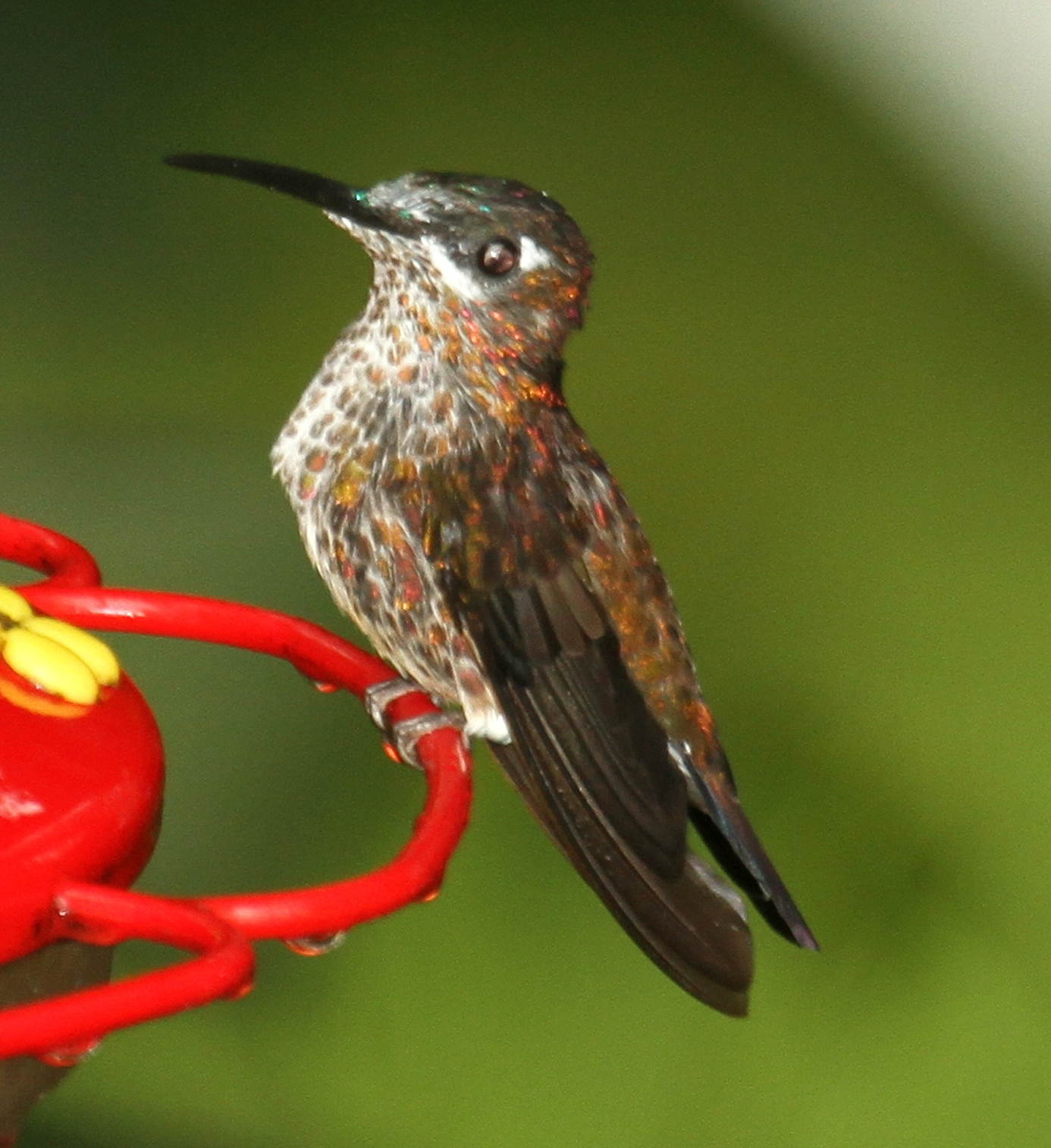
Female H. l. sagitta - Copa Linga Lodge, Ecuador (flash photo)

The violet-fronted brilliant is 11 to 13 cm (4.3 to 5.1 in) long. Males weigh 7.1 to 8.5 g (0.25 to 0.30 oz) and females 6.6 to 7.5 g (0.23 to 0.26 oz). Both sexes have a medium length, almost straight, black bill, a white malar streak, and a small white spot behind the eye. They both have a forked tail but the female's is less deeply indented than the male's.

Males of the nominate subspecies have bronzy green upperparts with a glittering blue forehead and a coppery neck. They have a glittering emerald green gorget and a dull bronzy green breast and belly. The central pair of tail feathers are bronzy green, the next pair steel blue with bronze tips, and the rest dark steel blue. Females have coppery green upperparts with a glittering green forehead. Their underparts are white transitioning to buffy on the belly, and the throat and breast are thickly spotted with glittering green. The tail feathers have white tips.

Males of subspecies H. l. parvula have a violet forehead and a paler and duller belly than the nominate. Their central tail feathers are lighter and greener than the nominate's and the rest more blackish. The female's belly has a cinnamon buff background. H. l. sagitta males have a blue forehead, a bluish breast, and the rest of the underparts and the tail like those of parvula. Females have a blue patch on the crown and an almost white belly. Males of H. l. otero have less coppery upperparts than the nominate; females have a brownish belly and little or no glittering on the forehead.

== Distribution and habitat ==
The subspecies of violet-fronted brilliant are found thus:

- H. l. leadbeateri, the Venezuelan Coastal Range between Falcón and Miranda states
- H. l. parvula, the Andes of western Venezuela, Serranía del Perijá on the Venezuela-Colombia border, most of the Eastern Andes of Colombia, and the northern end of the Central Andes.
- H. l. sagitta, the eastern slope of the Ecuadorean Andes south into Peru as far as the Department of Pasco
- H. l. otero, the eastern slope of the Andes from central Peru into northwestern Bolivia to Cochabamba Department

The species inhabits a variety of landscapes, mainly in the tropical and subtropical zones. It mainly occurs in the interior and edges of pre-montane rainforest and cloudforest, but is also found in scrub, clearings, secondary forest, and coffee plantations. In elevation it ranges between 400 and 2,400 m (1,300 and 7,900 ft).

== Behavior ==
=== Movement ===
The violet-fronted brilliant is sedentary.

=== Feeding ===
The violet-fronted brilliant forages mostly in the lower to middle strata of the forest, typically below 10 m (30 ft). Unlike some other brilliants, it forages alone and does not share flowering trees with others. In addition to nectar, it also feeds on insects captured by hawking. Insects are a substantial part of its diet though details of the plants that it frequents are lacking.

=== Breeding ===
The violet-fronted brilliant's nesting season spans from January to May. No other information about its breeding phenology has been published.

=== Vocalization ===
What is thought to be the violet-brilliant's song is "a continuous series of single strident 'chup' or 'tchep' notes". It also makes "a repeated, bright, descending phrase 'whee-tsee-tsee-tsew' that sounds like a jerky twittering."

== Status ==
The IUCN has assessed the violet-fronted brilliant as being of Least Concern. It has a large range, but its population size is unknown and believed to be decreasing. The species "appears to be quite common, at least locally."
