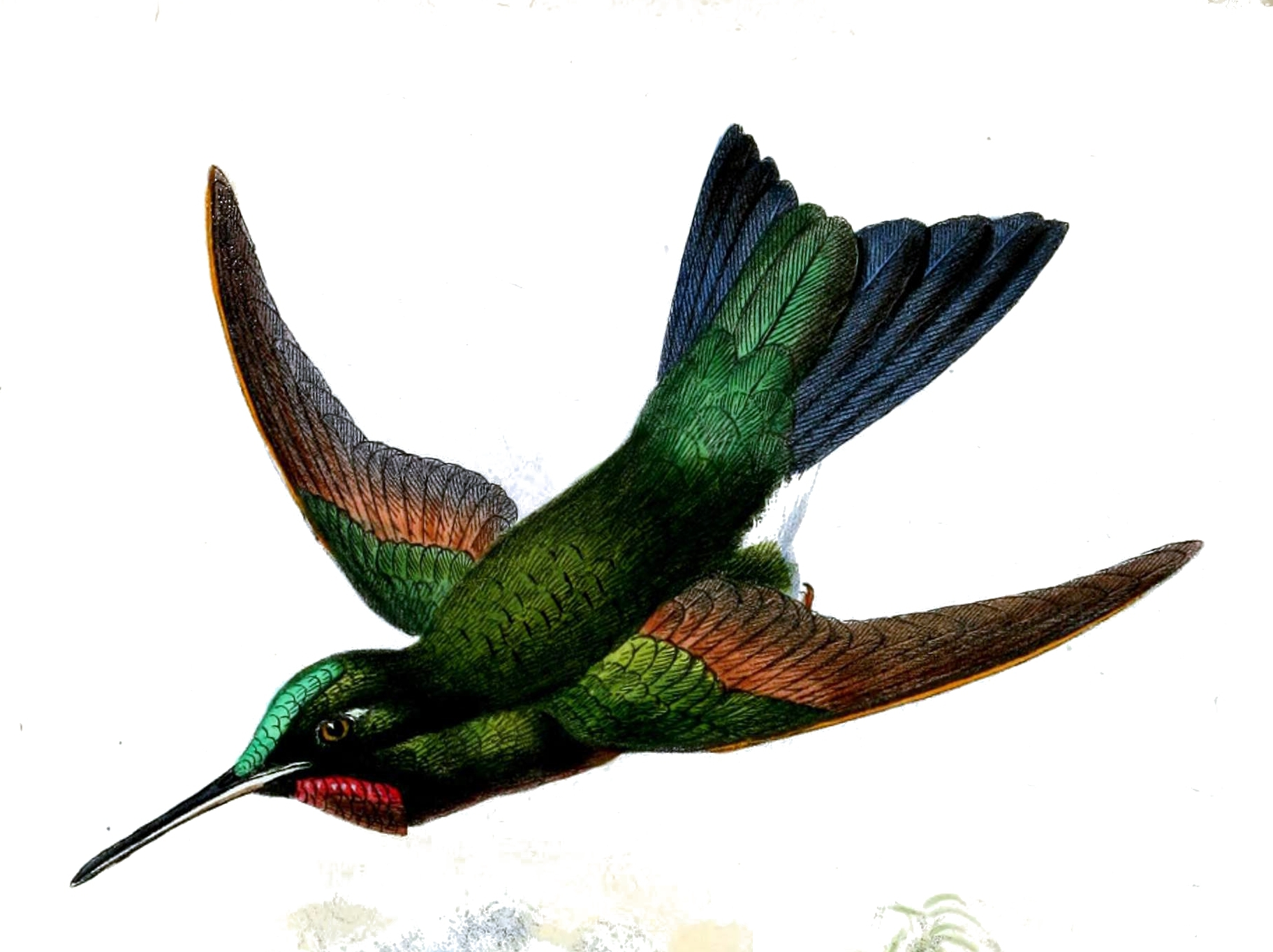

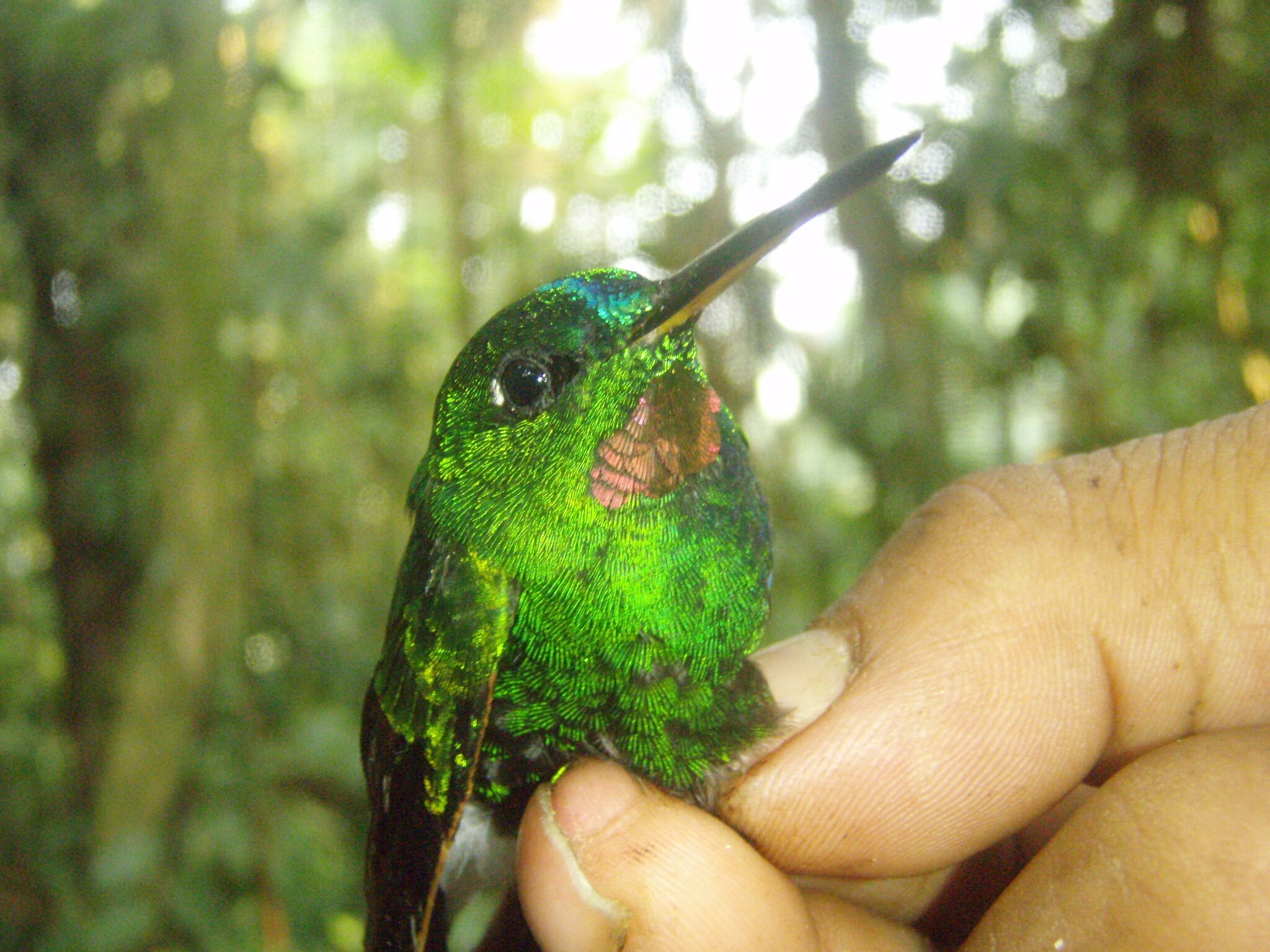

Conservation status
- Least Concern (IUCN 3.1)
- CITES Appendix II

Scientific classification
- Kingdom: Animalia
- Phylum: Chordata
- Class: Aves
- Order: Apodiformes
- Family: Trochilidae
- Genus: Heliodoxa
- Species: H. branickii

Binomial name
- Heliodoxa branickii (Taczanowski, 1874)

= Rufous-webbed brilliant =

Species of hummingbird

The rufous-webbed brilliant (Heliodoxa branickii) is a species of hummingbird in the "brilliants", tribe Heliantheini in subfamily Lesbiinae. It is endemic to Peru.

== Taxonomy and systematics ==
The rufous-webbed brilliant was at one time treated as the sole member of genus Lampraster, which in the mid 20th century was merged into the present genus Heliodoxa. It is monotypic.

== Description ==
The rufous-webbed brilliant is 11 to 11.5 cm (4.3 to 4.5 in) long. Males weigh about 5.8 g (0.20 oz) on average and females 5.4 g (0.19 oz). The species' English name comes from its cinnamon-rufous inner wing feathers; the rest of the wing is dusky. Both sexes have a black bill whose mandible base is paler. Males are mostly shining dark green. Their forehead is brighter glittering green and they have an iridescent rosy gorget. The undertail coverts are bright white. The central pair of tail feathers are green and the rest dark blue. Females also have shining dark green upperparts, flanks, and breast. They have a short white streak from the bill to below the eye. The throat and breast are white, with shining green tips to the feathers, and the belly is white to buffy. A gorget is often lacking, and when present is paler and yellower than the male's. The undertail coverts are bright white like the male's, but the blue outer tail feathers have white tips.

== Distribution and habitat ==
The rufous-webbed brilliant has been conclusively recorded only on the east slope of the Andes from central to southern Peru. There are also unconfirmed records in Bolivia. It inhabits the interior and edges of humid montane forest at elevations between 650 and 1,700 m (2,100 and 5,600 ft).

== Behavior ==
=== Movement ===
The rufous-webbed brilliant's movements, if any, have not been documented.

=== Feeding ===
The rufous-webbed brilliant primarily forages for nectar in the forest's understory and its edges, though the species of flowering plants it feeds at are only slightly known. It also eats small insects.

=== Breeding ===
The rufous-webbed brilliant's breeding phenology has not been documented.

=== Vocalization ===
The rufous-webbed brilliant's song is "a series of chew notes interspersed with a short, rapid, descending trill." Its call is "a sweet, descending tew".

== Status ==
The IUCN has assessed the rufous-webbed brilliant as being of Least Concern. It has a large range, but its population size is unknown and believed to be decreasing. No specific threats have been identified. It is considered uncommon to fairly common in Peru. It "shows some tolerance of habitat fragmentation, degradation and disturbance; however, outright forest clearance is expected to cause local population declines."
