= Ruby City =

Ruby City may refer to the following United States locations:

== Ghost towns ==
- Ruby City, Idaho
- Ruby City, Nevada
- Ruby City, North Carolina - see List of ghost towns in North Carolina
- Ruby City, Washington - see List of ghost towns in Washington

== Other ==
- Ruby City (San Antonio) museum in Texas
