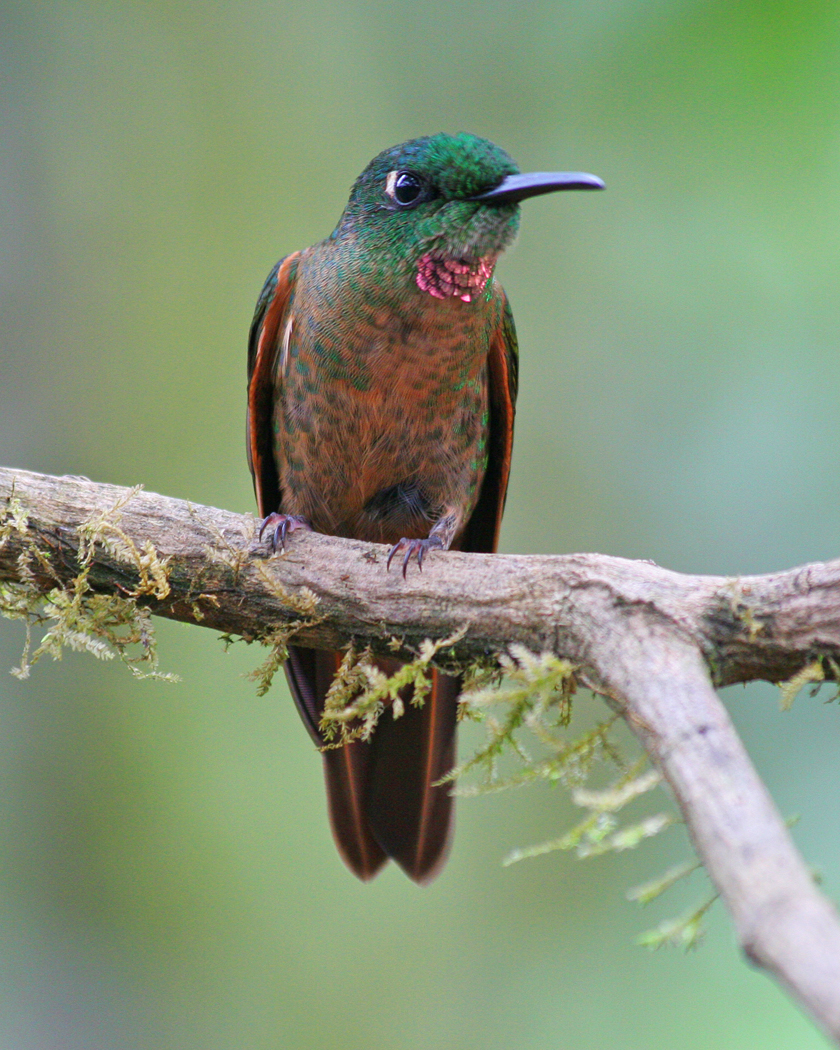
- Male
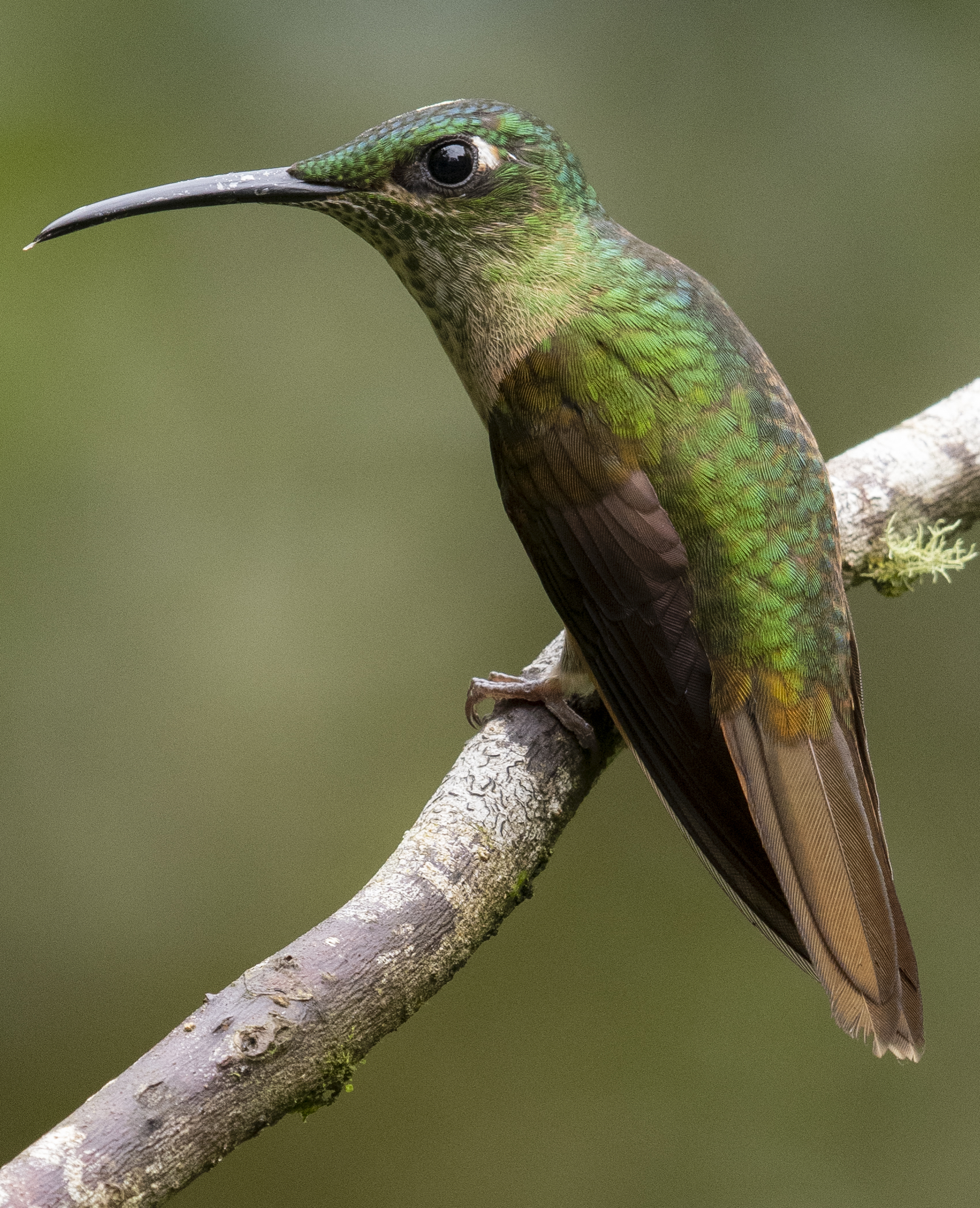
- Female

Conservation status
- Least Concern (IUCN 3.1)
- CITES Appendix II

Scientific classification
- Kingdom: Animalia
- Phylum: Chordata
- Class: Aves
- Order: Apodiformes
- Family: Trochilidae
- Genus: Heliodoxa
- Species: H. rubinoides

Binomial name
- Heliodoxa rubinoides (Bourcier & Mulsant, 1846)
- Distribution (in green)

= Fawn-breasted brilliant =

Species of bird

The fawn-breasted brilliant (Heliodoxa rubinoides) is a medium-sized species of hummingbird in the family Trochilidae. It is native to South America, where it occurs in Bolivia, Colombia, Ecuador, and Peru. Other common names include lilac-throated brilliant in English and brillante pechigamuza, colibrí de vientre ocre, and diamante pechigamuza in Spanish.

== Taxonomy ==
The fawn-breasted brilliant was originally described as Trochilus rubinoides by French naturalists Jules Bourcier and Étienne Mulsant in 1846, with the type locality given as Colombia. It was later moved to the genus Heliodoxa, which was introduced by John Gould in 1850. The genus name Heliodoxa derives from the Greek words hēlios ("sun") and doxa ("glory"), while the specific epithet rubinoides combines the Latin rubinus ("ruby-red") with the Greek suffix -oidēs ("resembling"), referring to the male's pink throat patch.

There are three recognized subspecies:

- Heliodoxa rubinoides rubinoides (Bourcier & Mulsant, 1846) – Central and Eastern Andes of Colombia.
- Heliodoxa rubinoides aequatorialis (Gould, 1860) – Western slope of the Andes from western Colombia (Antioquia) south to western Ecuador (Pichincha to El Oro and western Loja).
- Heliodoxa rubinoides cervinigularis (Salvin, 1892) – Eastern slope of the Andes in eastern Ecuador and Peru; also recorded in northern Cochabamba, central Bolivia.

== Description ==
The fawn-breasted brilliant is a medium-sized hummingbird, measuring 11 to 13 cm (4.3 to 5.1 in) in length and weighing approximately 7.2 to 10.2 g (0.25 to 0.36 oz). The bill is stout, fairly long (22–27 mm (0.87–1.06 in)), slightly decurved, and black.

Adult males have shining bronzy-green upperparts, with coppery tones on the wing coverts and a slightly forked, coppery-green tail. The underparts are warm buffy-cinnamon, with irregular green spotting on the flanks and throat sides. A distinctive feature is the small, isolated pinkish to lilac gorget patch on the lower throat. Females are similar but have duller plumage, more extensive green spotting on the underparts, and a smaller or absent throat patch. Juveniles resemble females but have buffy fringes on the head feathers.

== Distribution and habitat ==
The fawn-breasted brilliant is found in the Andes from western Colombia south to central Bolivia. It inhabits humid montane forests and cloud forests, primarily in the lower to mid-levels of the forest interior. It occasionally occurs at shaded forest borders, clearings, and near feeders. The species is found at elevations between 1,000 and 2,600 m (3,300 and 8,500 ft), though most records are from 1,100 to 2,200 m (3,600 to 7,200 ft). It is generally uncommon and patchily distributed in natural habitats, but can be more frequently observed at nectar feeders.

== Behavior ==
=== Diet ===
The diet of the fawn-breasted brilliant consists primarily of nectar from a variety of brightly colored, tubular flowers. It supplements this with small insects and spiders, which provide essential protein, especially during the breeding season. The bird catches insect prey by hawking in flight, gleaning from foliage, and plucking from spider webs. When feeding on nectar, it hovers before the flower or perches and hangs from it, inserting its long tongue up to 13 times per second. The species is strongly territorial around high-quality nectar sources, aggressively chasing away intruders such as other hummingbirds, bumblebees, and hawk moths.

=== Breeding ===
The fawn-breasted brilliant is only social during the breeding season, which spans from August to December in much of its range. The male performs a courtship display by flying in U-shaped patterns before the female. There is no pair bond, and the male is not involved with nesting or the rearing of the young. Both males and females mate with several partners.

The female constructs a compact, cup-shaped nest in a shrub or tree, typically in the forest understory. The nest is made of plant fibers, spider webs, animal hairs, and down, and it is lined externally with moss for camouflage. She lays a clutch of two white eggs, which she incubates alone for approximately 18–20 days. The female broods the chicks for about 12 days, after which there is not enough room for her in the nest. She feeds the nestlings by regurgitating insects, as they cannot persist on nectar alone. The young fledge at about 20 days of age.

=== Vocalizations ===
The fawn-breasted brilliant produces two main vocalizations: a series of sharp, metallic "tchik" notes, often given in rapid succession as an alarm or territorial warning, and a common "swi-swi-swi-swu" call. Non-vocal communication includes the audible buzzing of wings during flight and displays, as well as tail fanning during aggressive or courtship interactions.

== Conservation ==
The fawn-breasted brilliant is classified as Least Concern on the IUCN Red List due to its extremely large geographic range, which exceeds 1,100,000 km^{2} (420,000 sq mi). However, the global population trend is suspected to be decreasing as a result of ongoing habitat loss and fragmentation, primarily from deforestation, agricultural expansion, and mining. The species is listed on Appendix II of CITES, which regulates international trade. It occurs in several protected areas across its range, including Podocarpus National Park in Ecuador.

== Gallery ==
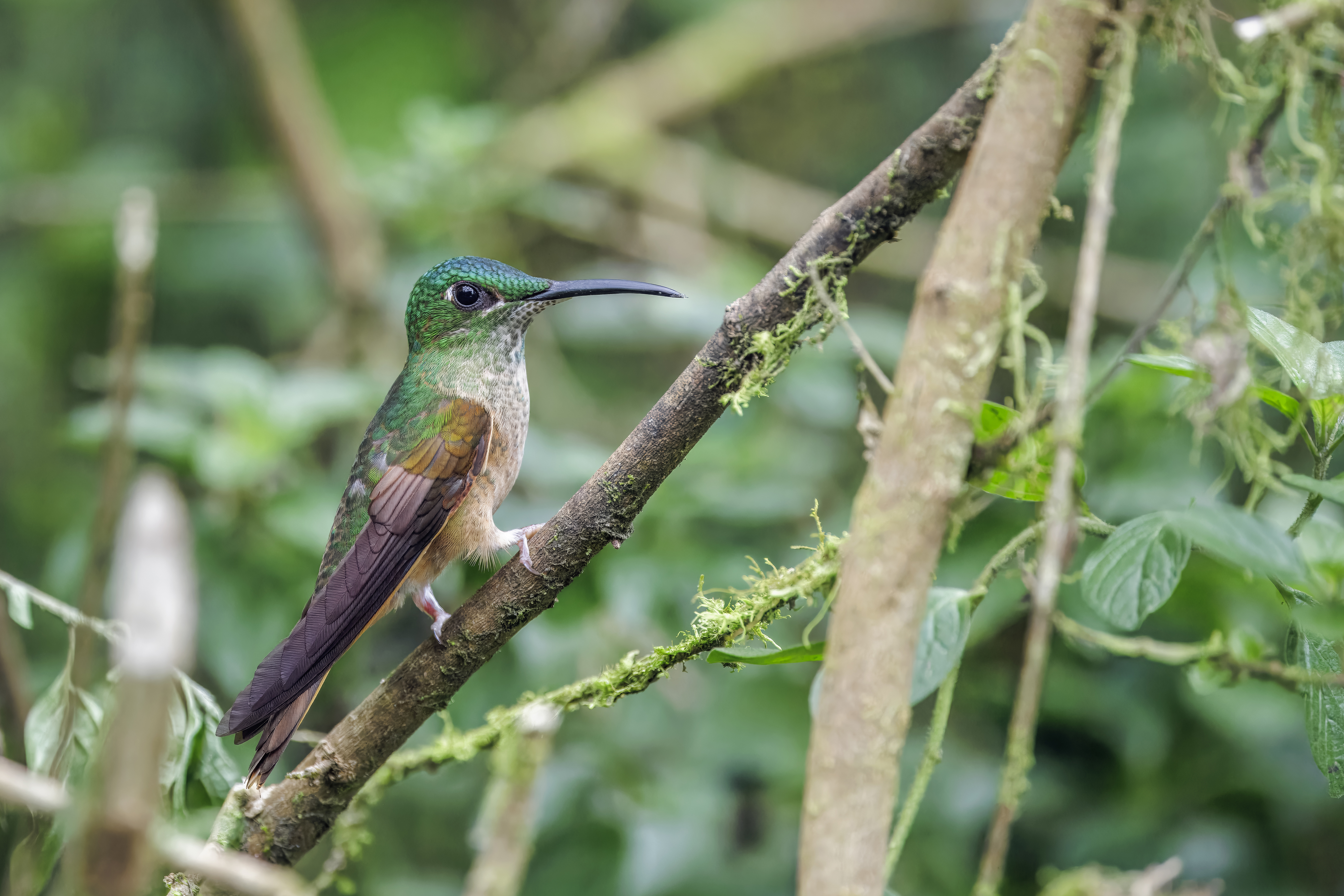
H. r. aequatorialis, Nanegalito, Ecuador

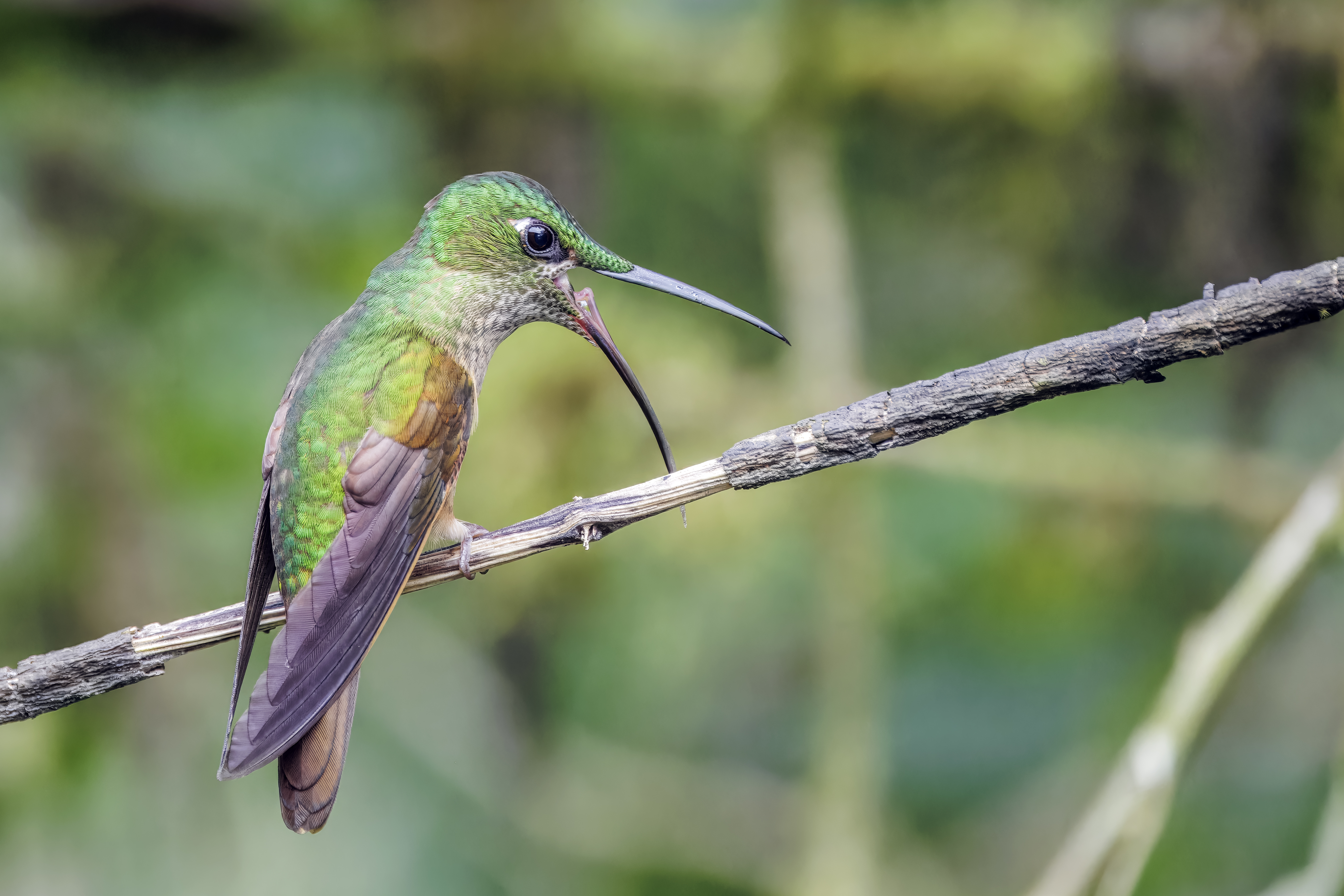
H. r. aequatorialis, Nanegalito, Ecuador

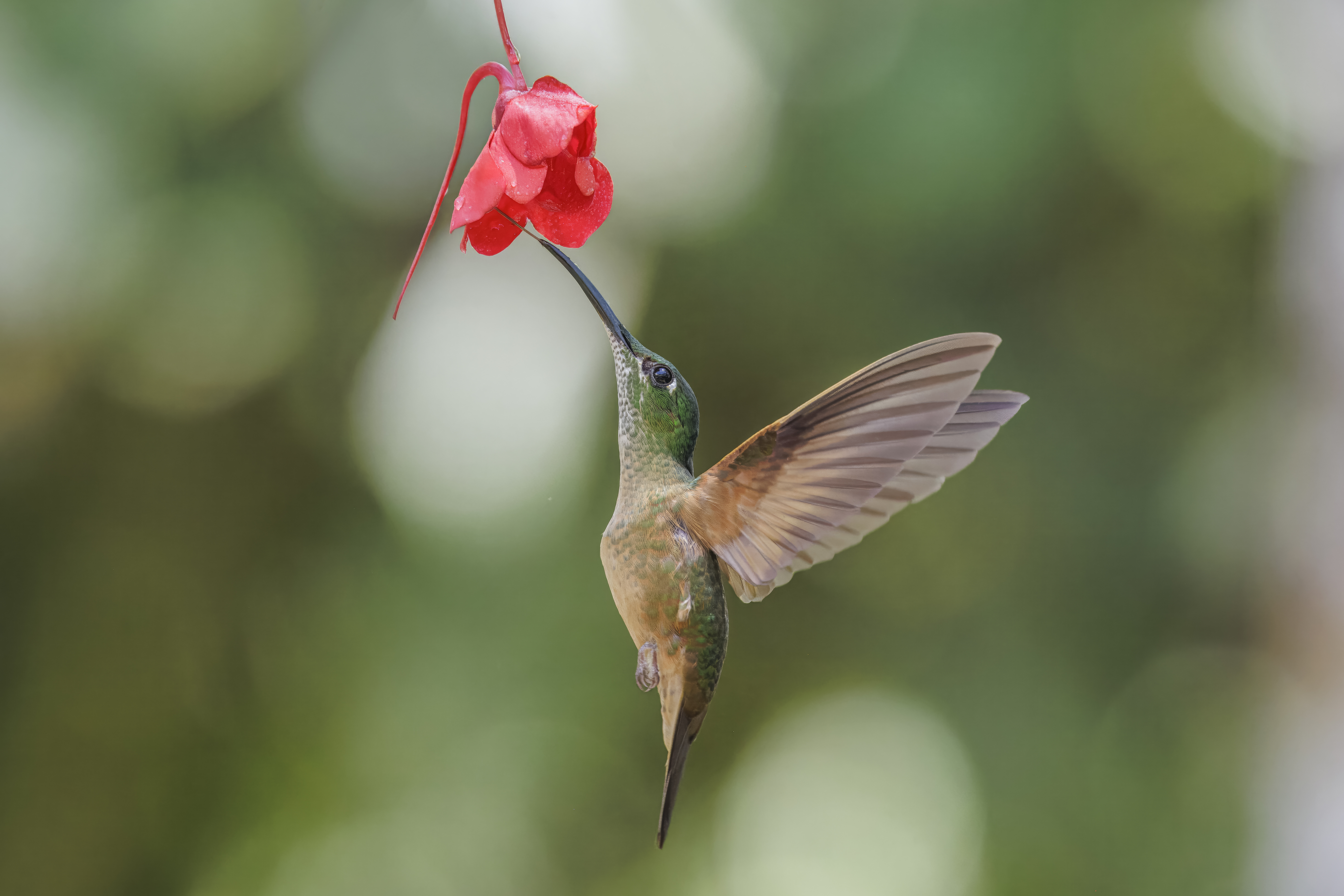
H. r. aequatorialis in flight, Nanegalito, Ecuador
