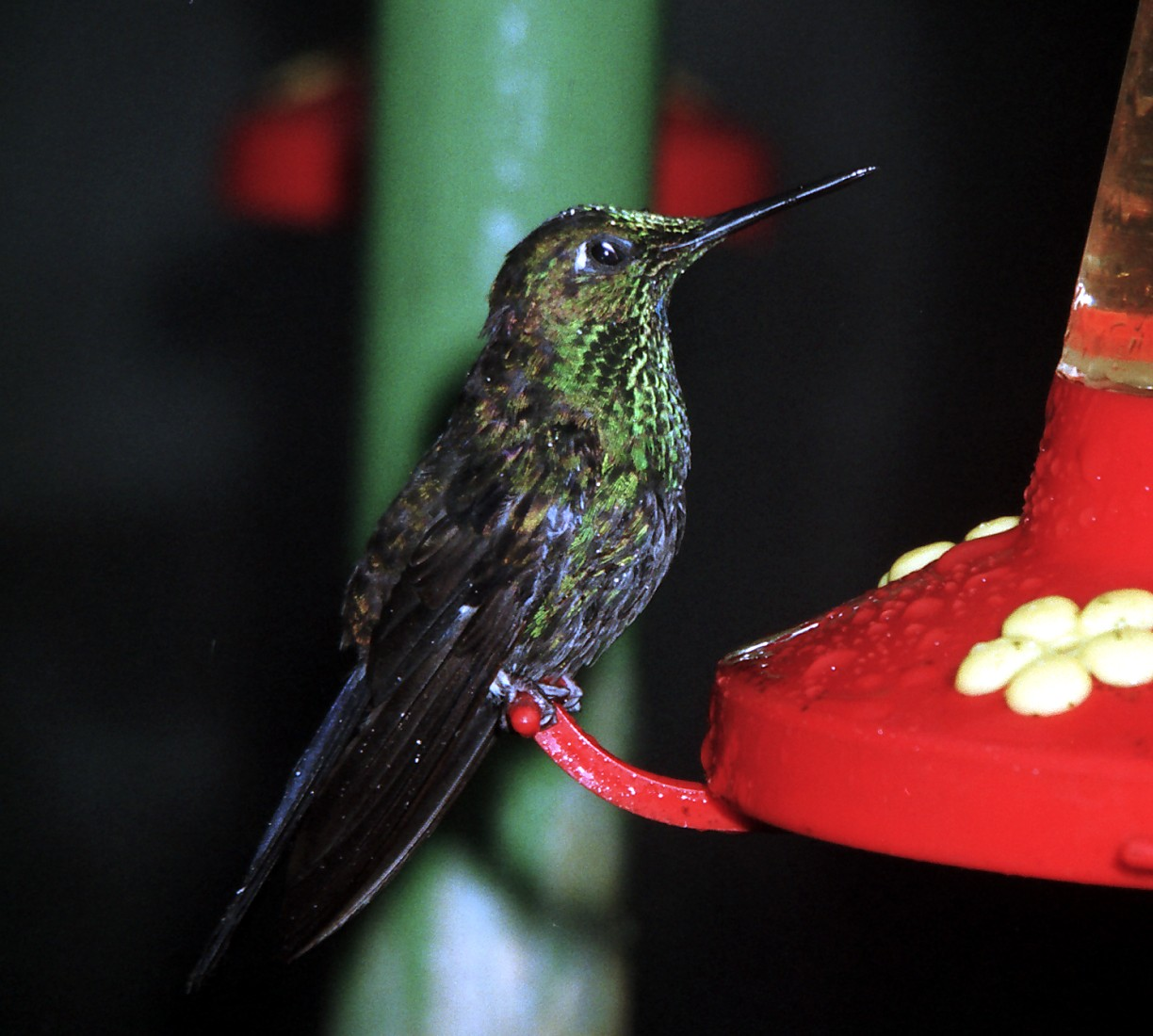
- male green-crowned brilliant, Heliodoxa jacula

Scientific classification
- Kingdom: Animalia
- Phylum: Chordata
- Class: Aves
- Order: Apodiformes
- Family: Trochilidae
- Tribe: Heliantheini
- Genus: Heliodoxa; Gould, 1850

Type species
- Trochilus leadbeateri (violet-fronted brilliant) Bourcier, 1843

= Heliodoxa =

Genus of birds

Heliodoxa is a genus of hummingbirds in the family Trochilidae.

== Taxonomy ==
The genus Heliodoxa was introduced in 1850 by the English ornithologist John Gould. The genus name combines the Ancient Greek hēlios meaning "sun" and doxa meaning "glory" or "magnificence". The type species was subsequently designated by Charles Lucien Bonaparte as the violet-fronted brilliant.

The genus contains ten species:

Genus Heliodoxa – Gould, 1850 – ten species
Common name	Scientific name and subspecies	Range	Size and ecology	IUCN status and estimated population
Gould's jewelfront Male	Heliodoxa aurescens (Gould, 1846)	Brazil, central Ecuador and Peru	Size: Habitat: Diet:	LC
Brazilian ruby Male Female	Heliodoxa rubricauda (Boddaert, 1783)	Brazil (Bahia south to Rio Grande do Sul)	Size: Habitat: Diet:	LC
Fawn-breasted brilliant Male Female	Heliodoxa rubinoides (Bourcier & Mulsant, 1846) Three subspecies: H. r. aequatorialis; H. r. cervinigularis; H. r. rubinoides	Bolivia, Colombia, Ecuador, and Peru	Size: Habitat: Diet:	LC
Violet-fronted brilliant Male Female	Heliodoxa leadbeateri (Bourcier, 1843) Four subspecies: H. l. leadbeateri (Bourcier, 1843); H. l. parvula Berlepsch, 1888; H. l. sagitta (Reichenbach, 1854); H. l. otero (Tschudi, 1844)	Bolivia, Colombia, Ecuador, Peru, and Venezuela	Size: Habitat: Diet:	LC
Velvet-browed brilliant	Heliodoxa xanthogonys Salvin & Godman, 1882 Two subspecies: H. x. xanthogonys; H. x. williardi	Brazil, Guyana, Suriname, and Venezuela	Size: Habitat: Diet:	LC
Black-throated brilliant	Heliodoxa schreibersii (Bourcier, 1847) Two subspecies: H. s. schreibersii; H. s. whitelyana	Brazil, Colombia, Ecuador and Peru	Size: Habitat: Diet:	LC
Pink-throated brilliant	Heliodoxa gularis (Gould, 1860)	Colombia, Ecuador, and Peru	Size: Habitat: Diet:	LC
Rufous-webbed brilliant	Heliodoxa branickii (Taczanowski, 1874)	Peru	Size: Habitat: Diet:	LC
Empress brilliant Male Female	Heliodoxa imperatrix (Gould, 1856)	Colombia and Ecuador	Size: Habitat: Diet:	LC
Green-crowned brilliant Male Female	Heliodoxa jacula (Gould, 1850) Three subspecies: H. j. jacula; H. j. henryi; H. j. jamersoni	Colombia, Costa Rica, Ecuador, and Panama	Size: Habitat: Diet:	LC
