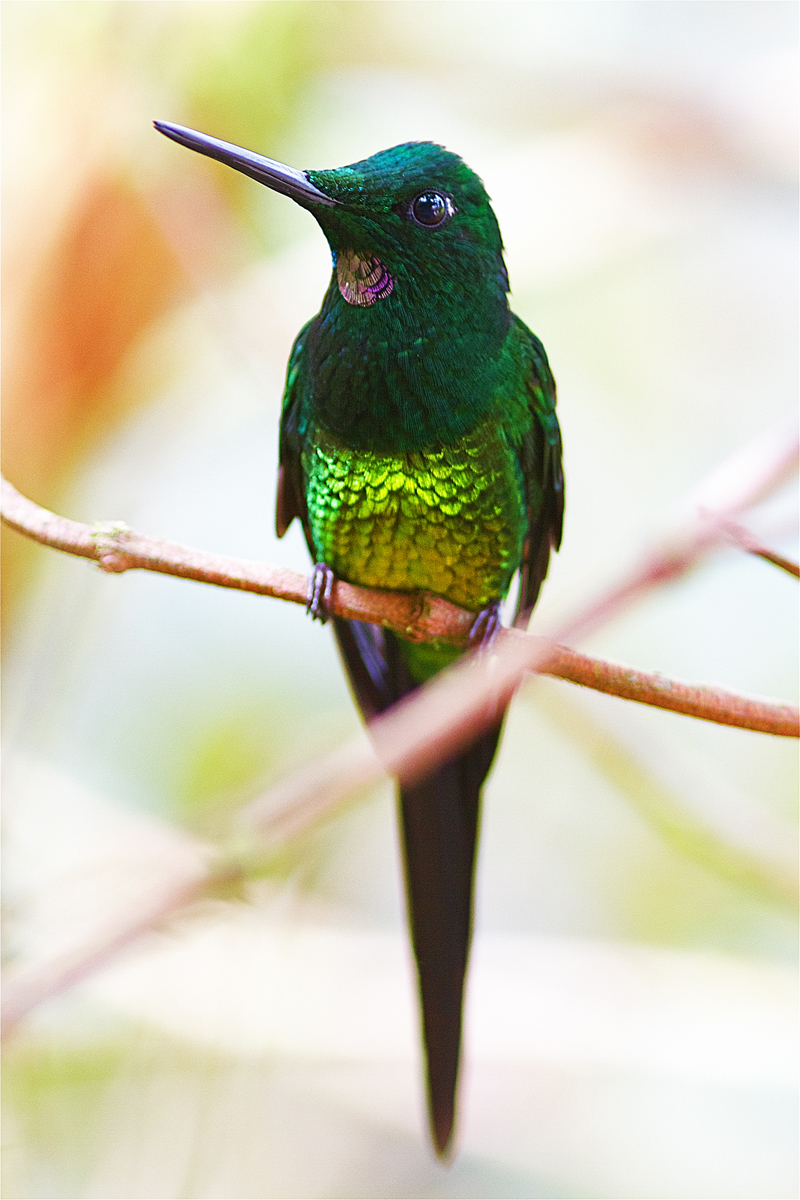

Conservation status
- Least Concern (IUCN 3.1)
- CITES Appendix II

Scientific classification
- Kingdom: Animalia
- Phylum: Chordata
- Class: Aves
- Order: Apodiformes
- Family: Trochilidae
- Genus: Heliodoxa
- Species: H. imperatrix

Binomial name
- Heliodoxa imperatrix (Gould, 1856)

= Empress brilliant =

Species of hummingbird

The empress brilliant (Heliodoxa imperatrix) is a species of hummingbird in the "brilliants", tribe Heliantheini in subfamily Lesbiinae. It is found in Colombia and Ecuador.

== Taxonomy and systematics ==
In the early part of the 20th century the empress brilliant was treated as the only member of genus Eugenia, which was later merged into the present Heliodoxa. The species is monotypic.

== Description ==
Male empress brilliants are 15 to 17 cm (5.9 to 6.7 in) long and weigh about 9.3 g (0.33 oz). Females are 12 to 13.5 cm (4.7 to 5.3 in) long and weigh about 8.3 g (0.29 oz). The adult male's forehead, face, and breast are mostly glittering dark green, with a square glittering pale violet patch in the center of the throat. Its crown and nape are dark green and the rest of the upperparts dark bronzy green. Its belly is glittering golden green. The central tail feathers are dark bronze and the rest longer and black with a bronze gloss. The adult female's upperparts are bronzy green. The center of its throat and breast are grayish with much bronzy green flecking, the flanks solid bronzy green, and the belly golden green. The central tail feathers are bronzy green and the others dull black with a bronze gloss.

Immature males have a dull dark bronzy green head, throat, and breast; bright buff chin and sides of the throat; and a duller and bronzier green belly than the adult. Immature females also have a buffy chin, and the green feathers of the breast are duller than the adult's and have buffy fringes.

== Distribution and habitat ==
The empress brilliant is found on the Pacific slope of the Andes from Colombia's Chocó Department south into Ecuador as far as Pichincha Province. It inhabits a variety of very wet landscapes including foothill forest, the interior and edges of cloudforest, and mature secondary forest. In elevation it ranges from 400 to 2,000 m (1,300 to 6,600 ft).

== Behavior ==
=== Movement ===
The movements of the empress brilliant, if any, have not been described.

=== Feeding ===
Both sexes of empress brilliant forage from the mid-level to the forest canopy, and females also forage in the understorey. A primary source of nectar are the flowers of Marcgravia and Marcgraviastrum vines, where it perches to feed. It also feeds by hovering under drooping flowers of Ericaceae. In addition to feeding on nectar, it also captures small insects by gleaning from foliage and hawking from a perch.

=== Breeding ===
The empress brilliant's breeding season spans from January to April. The few known nests were cups of tree fern scales and other plant material held together with spider silk and lined with soft seed fluff. Very little else is known about the species' breeding phenology.

=== Vocalization ===
One empress brilliant vocalization is a "repeated single 'tsit' note". It is also given singly while hovering and feeding.

== Status ==
The IUCN has assessed the empress brilliant as being of Least Concern. However, it has a restricted range and its population size and trend are unknown. No immediate threats have been identified. It appears to be reasonably common and occurs in some protected areas. "[Its] very wet forest habitat still mostly intact".
