= HMS Ruby =

Nine ships of the Royal Navy have borne the name HMS Ruby:

- English ship Ruby (1652) was initially a 40-gun warship launched in 1652. She fought in the War of the Spanish Succession as part of a fleet under Admiral John Benbow. She was rebuilt in 1706 carrying between 46 and 54 guns. and captured in 1707 by the French ship Mars.
- HMS Ruby (1666) was a 66-gun third-rate ship of the line, originally the French ship Rubis. She was captured in 1666, hulked after sustaining storm damage in 1682 and broken up in 1685.
- HMS Ruby (1708) was a 54-gun fourth-rate ship of the line launched in 1708. She was renamed HMS Mermaid in 1744 and was sold in 1748.
- HMS Ruby (1745) was a 50-gun third-rate ship of the line launched in 1745 and broken up in 1765.
- HMS Rubis (1747), Rubis (1729), a 52-gun ship of the line, captured in 1747 and taken into service as HMS Rubis and condemned in 1748.
- HMS Ruby (1776) was a 64-gun third-rate ship of the line launched in 1776 that served at Bermuda between 1811 and her breaking up in 1821.
- HMS Ruby (1842) was an iron paddle tender launched in 1842 and sold in 1846.
- HMS Ruby (1854) was a wood screw gunboat launched in 1854 and broken up in 1868.
- HMS Ruby (1876) was an Emerald-class composite screw corvette launched in 1876. She was converted to a coal hulk in 1904 and renamed C 10. She was sold in 1921.
- HMS Ruby (1910) was an Acorn-class destroyer launched in 1910 and sold in 1921.

There was also HMS Ruby Prize, a 44-gun French privateer that HMS Ruby captured in 1694 and that the Navy sold in 1698. She became a merchantman and was lost at Mayotte in 1799.

== See also ==
- French ship Rubis
- Ruby (ship)
