= Ruby (surname) =

Ruby is a surname. Notable people with the surname include:

- Clayton Ruby (1942–2022), Canadian lawyer and activist
- Dan Ruby (born 1964), American politician
- Dave Ruby, American actor
- Ethan Ruby, American businessman
- Georg Ruby (born 1953), German musician and composer
- Harry Ruby (1895–1974), American songwriter and screenwriter
- Israel Ruby (c. 1888–1983), American attorney and politician
- Jack Ruby (1911–1967), American businessman and murderer of presidential assassin Lee Harvey Oswald
- Jacob Ruby (born 1992), Canadian football player
- Jake Ruby (born 2000), Canadian soccer player
- Jay Ruby (1935–2022), American anthropologist and academic
- Joe Ruby (1933–2020), American animator, writer, television producer, and music editor
- Karine Ruby (1978–2009), French snowboarder
- Laura Ruby, American author
- Lloyd Ruby (1928–2009), American race car driver
- Pierre Ruby (born 1932), French cyclist
- Sam Ruby, American software developer
- Sterling Ruby (born 1972), American artist
