= Ruby Creek Indian Reserve No. 2 =

Indian reserve in British Columbia, Canada

Coordinates: 49°22′00″N 121°37′00″W

Ruby Creek 2, normally referred to as Ruby Creek Indian Reserve No. 2, is an Indian reserve in the Upper Fraser Valley region of British Columbia, Canada, located at the mouth of Ruby Creek at the northeast end of the District of Kent, near the locality of the same name, which is a part of Kent. The reserve is 16.6 hectares (41 acres) in size, and is under the jurisdiction of the Skawahlook First Nation, a member government of the Sto:lo Nation tribal council.
