= Ruby Creek (South Dakota) =

Stream in South Dakota, U.S.

Coordinates: 43°45′55″N 103°39′19″W

Ruby Creek is a stream in the U.S. state of South Dakota.

Ruby Creek received its name from the deposits of colorful stones pioneers likened to rubies.

== See also ==
- List of rivers of South Dakota
