= French ship Rubis =

Seventeen ships of the French Navy have been named Rubis ("Ruby"), or Ruby as it was spelled until the 18th century:

- Rubis (1648), a 48-gun ship of the line.
- HMS Ruby (1666), originally Rubis, a 64-gun ship of the line, captured in 1666, taken into service as HMS Ruby. She was hulked after sustaining storm damage in 1682 and broken up in 1685.
- Rubis (1671), a 70-gun ship of the line, broken up in 1700.
- Rubis (1672), a 50-gun ship of the line.
- Rubis (1673), a fireship.
- Rubis (1680), a 54-gun ship of the line, hulked in 1722.
- Rubis (1704), a 56-gun ship of the line, broken up in 1729
- Rubis (1707), a 56-gun ship of the line, formerly HMS Ruby captured by Mars in 1707. Broken up in 1708.
- Rubis (1709), a gunboat.
- Rubis (1729), a 52-gun ship of the line, captured in 1747 and taken into service as HMS Rubis and condemned in 1748.
- Rubis (1744), a 20-gun corvette, broken up in 1748.
- Rubis (1747), a 26-gun ship, condemned in 1747.
- Rubis (1812), a 40-gun frigate. She ran aground in 1813 and was burnt to prevent capture.
- Rubis (1844), a paddle corvette.
- Rubis (1884), a gunboat.
- Rubis (1907), an Émeraude-class submarine.
- Rubis (1931), a Saphir-class minelaying submarine. She was sunk in 1958 to be used as a sonar target.
- Rubis (S601), a nuclear attack submarine and lead ship of her class.
- Rubis (Q---), the fifth planned Suffren-class nuclear attack submarine

== See also ==
- HMS Ruby

== Sources and references ==
- Les bâtiments ayant porté le nom de Rubis
- Roche, Jean-Michel (2005). Dictionnaire des bâtiments de la flotte de guerre française de Colbert à nos jours. Vol. 1, 1671–1870. pp. 389–390. ISBN 978-2-9525917-0-6. OCLC 165892922.
