= Ruby, Virginia =

Unincorporated community in Virginia, US

Coordinates: 38°30′15″N 77°30′56″W

Ruby is an unincorporated community in Stafford County, in the U.S. state of Virginia.

Ruby was formerly the site of the Ruby Post Office, which moved to Lake Arrowhead in the late 1970s. As a United States Post Office site, the community had appeared in world atlases. The post office had been combined with a general store, which later closed, hence its move to Lake Arrowhead. The community around the old post office is still called Ruby but remains unincorporated.
