= Ruby Creek, British Columbia =

Locality in British Columbia, Canada

Coordinates: 49°21′00″N 121°36′00″W

Ruby Creek is a locality on the Fraser River in the District of Kent, British Columbia, Canada, in the Upper Fraser Valley region, located on BC Highway 7 and the mainline of the Canadian Pacific Railway, near the confluence of Ruby Creek with the Fraser, northeast of Sea Bird Island. Ruby Creek Indian Reserve No. 2 of the Skawahlook First Nation is nearby, as is also Skawahlook Indian Reserve No. 1, one mile northeast of the mouth of Ruby Creek. Also in the locality is Lukseetsissum Indian Reserve No. 9 of the Yale First Nation.
