= Ruby Creek (Fraser River tributary) =

Creek in British Columbia, Canada

Coordinates: 49°21′00″N 121°36′00″W

Ruby Creek is a tributary of the Fraser River in the Lower Mainland of British Columbia, Canada, rising in the southern Lillooet Ranges and joining the Fraser east of Sea Bird Island at the locality of Ruby Creek and the associated Ruby Creek Indian Reserve No. 2. It is the largest tributary along the north side of the Fraser between Hope and Agassiz.

== See also ==
- List of rivers of British Columbia
