= Ruby City, Nevada =

- Ghost Town
- Location within the state of Nevada Ruby City (the United States)
- Coordinates: 40°42′59″N 115°12′23″W
- Country: United States
- State: Nevada
- County: Elko
- Elevation: 6,106 ft (1,861 m)
- Time zone: UTC-8 (Pacific (PST))
  - Summer (DST): UTC-7 (PDT)

Ruby City is a ghost town in Elko County, Nevada, United States. It was a planned city of 75 families, established seven miles south of Arthur, Nevada in 1912.

== History ==
Ruby City was created by land promoters from Utah who had purchased 5,000 acres (2,000 ha) and built 75 homes. In 1915, there was a hotel, two schools, a water canal and a chapel of the Church of Jesus Christ of Latter-day Saints (LDS Church). However, because of water issues and bad soil, the community was abandoned by 1918 and became a ghost town.
