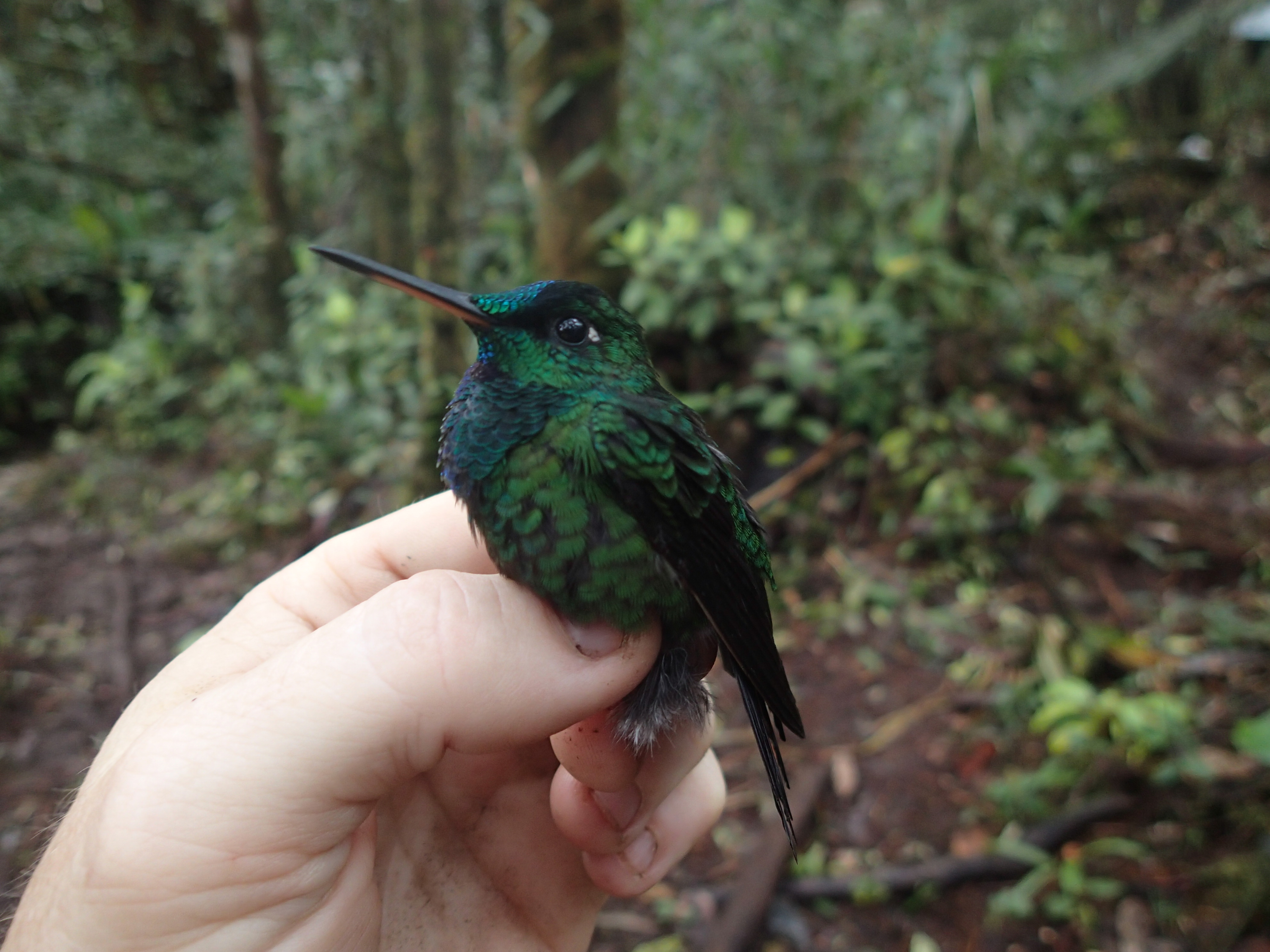

Conservation status
- Least Concern (IUCN 3.1)
- CITES Appendix II

Scientific classification
- Kingdom: Animalia
- Phylum: Chordata
- Class: Aves
- Order: Apodiformes
- Family: Trochilidae
- Genus: Heliodoxa
- Species: H. xanthogonys

Binomial name
- Heliodoxa xanthogonys Salvin & Godman, 1882

= Velvet-browed brilliant =

Species of hummingbird

The velvet-browed brilliant (Heliodoxa xanthogonys) is a species of hummingbird in the "brilliants", tribe Heliantheini in subfamily Lesbiinae. It is found in Brazil, Guyana, Suriname, and Venezuela.

== Taxonomy and systematics ==
The velvet-browed brilliant has two subspecies, the nominate H. x. xanthogonys and H. x. williardi.

== Description ==
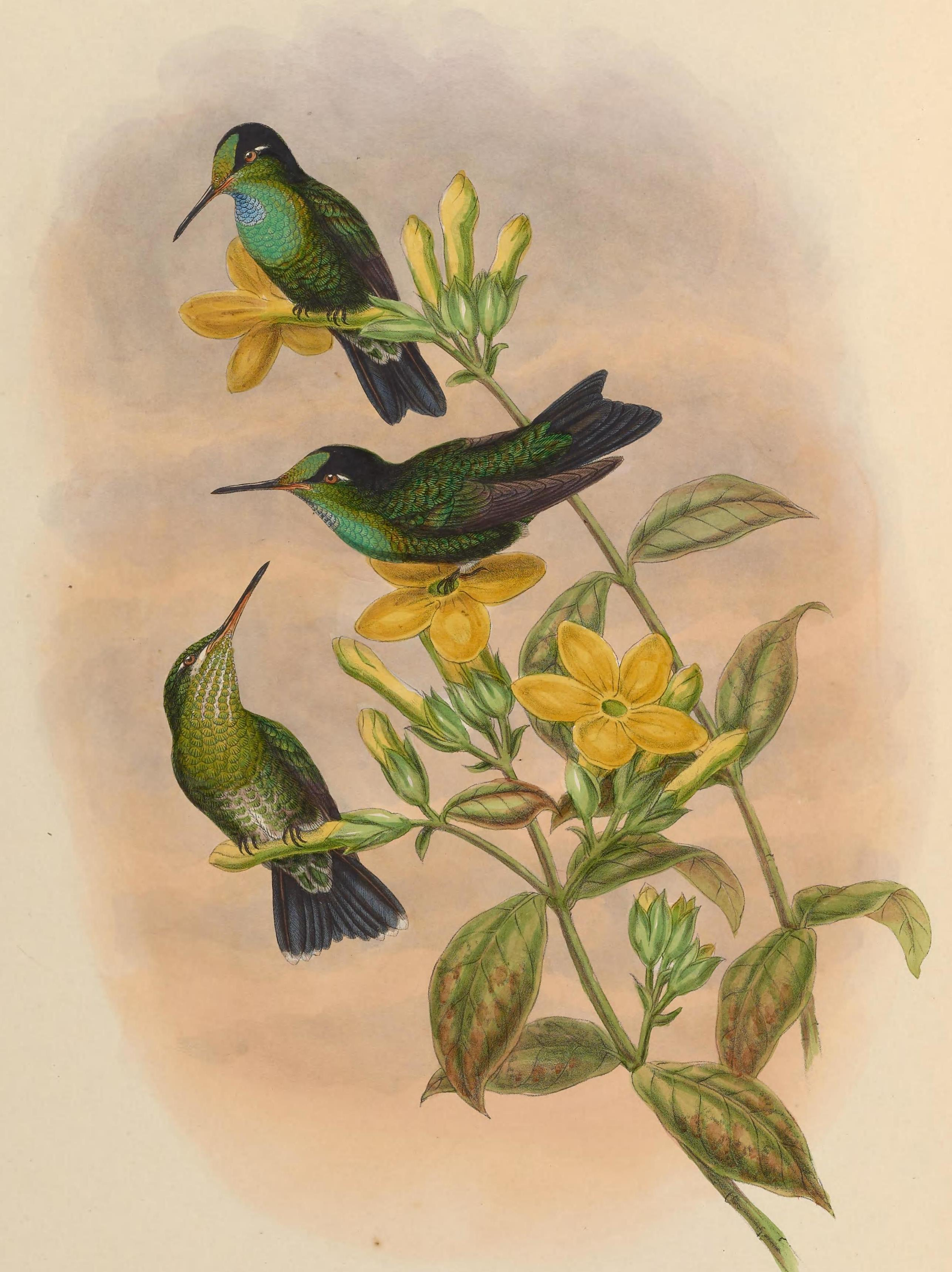

The velvet-browed brilliant is 10 to 11 cm (3.9 to 4.3 in) long including its approximately 2 cm (0.8 in) bill, and weighs 5.5 to 7.5 g (0.19 to 0.26 oz). Both sexes have a straight bill; the maxilla is blackish and the mandible orange with a dark tip. Both have a small white spot behind the eye.

Males of the nominate subspecies have a glittering golden- to emerald green central crown and a velvety blackish supercilium. The rest of the face, the hindneck, and the upperparts are dark golden green. The upper throat has a glittering violet-blue patch, the breast and belly are dark golden green, and the undertail coverts are greenish with narrow gray and rufous edges. The uppertail coverts and central tail feathers are bronze- to emerald green and the rest of the tail blackish green. Females are generally duller, with less iridescence, and do not have the black supercilium or the violet throat patch. They have a white "moustache", and most of the underparts are whitish with greenish spots. The tail feathers have white tips.

Males of subspecies H. x. williardi have longer wings and tail than the nominate but are otherwise similar. Females have less green and more white on their underparts, with no green spots on the belly. The tail is emerald green with broad white edges to the feathers.

== Distribution and habitat ==
The nominate subspecies of velvet-browed brilliant is found in the highlands and tepuis where Venezuela, Guyana, and Brazil meet. In addition, there are a few records in Suriname. Subspecies H. x. williardi is found further south, on the tepuis of the southern Venezuela-northern Brazil border. The species inhabits the interior, edges, and clearings of sub-montane forest and also scrublands. In elevation is mostly occurs between 700 and 2,000 m (2,300 and 6,600 ft) but has been recorded as low as 500 m (1,600 ft).

== Behavior ==
=== Movement ===
The velvet-browed brilliant is believed to be sedentary but may make some seasonal elevational movements.

=== Feeding ===
The velvet-browed brilliant forages for nectar both low down and high in the canopy, but in the forest interior tends to stay low. It feeds by trap-lining, visiting a circuit of flowering plants, but also defends patches of flowers. In some seasons the sexes tend to separate and feed at different resources. In addition to nectar, the species also feeds on small insects.

=== Breeding ===
The velvet-browed brilliant's breeding season is apparently from January to March. It makes a saddle-type nest but nothing else is known about its breeding phenology.

=== Vocalization ===
The velvet-browed brilliant gives a "repeated nasal 'squank'" in flight. Another vocalization is "high-pitched drawn-out reeling trills" that rise and fall in pitch.

== Status ==
The IUCN has assessed the velvet-browed brilliant as being of Least Concern. However, it has a restricted range and its population size is unknown and believed to be decreasing. It is locally abundant, and might be present in unexplored suitable habitat in the gaps among its scattered known locations.
