= Rubí Sanz Gamo =

Spanish museum curator (1952–2025)

Rubí Eulalia Sanz Gamo
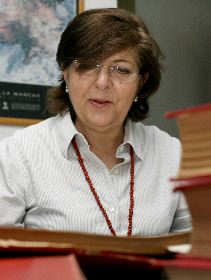
- Sanz Gamo in 2019
- Born: 12 June 1952; Madrid, Spain
- Died: 16 May 2025 (aged 72); Albacete, Spain

Academic background
- Education: Complutense University of Madrid (BA); University of Alicante (PhD)
- Thesis: Cultura ibérica y romanización en tierras de Albacete: los siglos de transición (1996)

Academic work
- Institutions: Museo de Albacete; Museo Arqueológico Nacional; Government of Castilla–La Mancha

Rubí Eulalia Sanz Gamo (12 June 1952 – 16 May 2025) was a Spanish art historian, museum curator and public administrator. She was known for directing the Museo de Albacete for more than three decades and the Museo Arqueológico Nacional (MAN) between 2004 and 2010. She also served briefly as regional minister of Culture in Castilla–La Mancha and sat on numerous Spanish and international heritage bodies.

== Early life and education ==
Sanz Gamo was born on 12 June 1952 in Madrid. After completing secondary school locally, she studied art history at the Complutense University of Madrid, graduating in 1974. She earned a doctorate in history from the University of Alicante in 1996 with a thesis on the transition from Iberian to Roman culture in the province of Albacete, published the following year as Cultura ibérica y romanización en tierras de Albacete: los siglos de transición.

== Career ==
Fresh from postgraduate study, Sanz Gamo tutored at the UNED centre in Albacete (1976–1984) before passing the state examination to join the Corps of Museum Conservators in 1986. Between 1983 and 2004 she was director of the Museum of Albacete and the director of the National Archaeological Museum (MAN) between 2004 and 2010.

In August 1999, the regional president José Bono appointed her Consejera de Cultura (minister of Culture); although she stepped down in March 2000, she laid the groundwork for the network of archaeological parks in Castilla-La Mancha.

The Ministry of Culture recruited her in December 2004 to lead the Museo Arqueológico Nacional. During a six-year mandate, she launched the museum’s architectural and museographic overhaul and curated the emblematic show Tesoros del MAN. In 2008, she publicly defended the state's custodianship of the Dama de Elche, arguing that public heritage "should not be fragmented". She also sat on bodies such as the Junta Superior de Museos and the patronatos of Altamira and Lázaro Galdiano.

After returning to Albacete in 2011, she completed her career at the provincial museum. In parallel, she continued scholarly work, advising the Centro Botín exhibition Picasso Íbero (2021) alongside leading Iberian-art specialists.

== Death ==
Sanz Gamo died in Albacete on 16 May 2025, at the age of 72.

== Awards and honours ==
Sanz Gamo received the Medalla al Mérito Cultural Extraordinario de Castilla-La Mancha in 2022, the Premio Rotary Club Albacete in 2012, the Premio Pablo Iglesias awarded by the Albacete branch of the PSOE in 2024, and the 2023 Prize of the Archaeology and Heritage Section of the regional Academy.

She was also a corresponding member of the German Archaeological Institute (2007), the Real Academia de la Historia (2000) and the Real Academia de Bellas Artes de San Fernando (1990).
