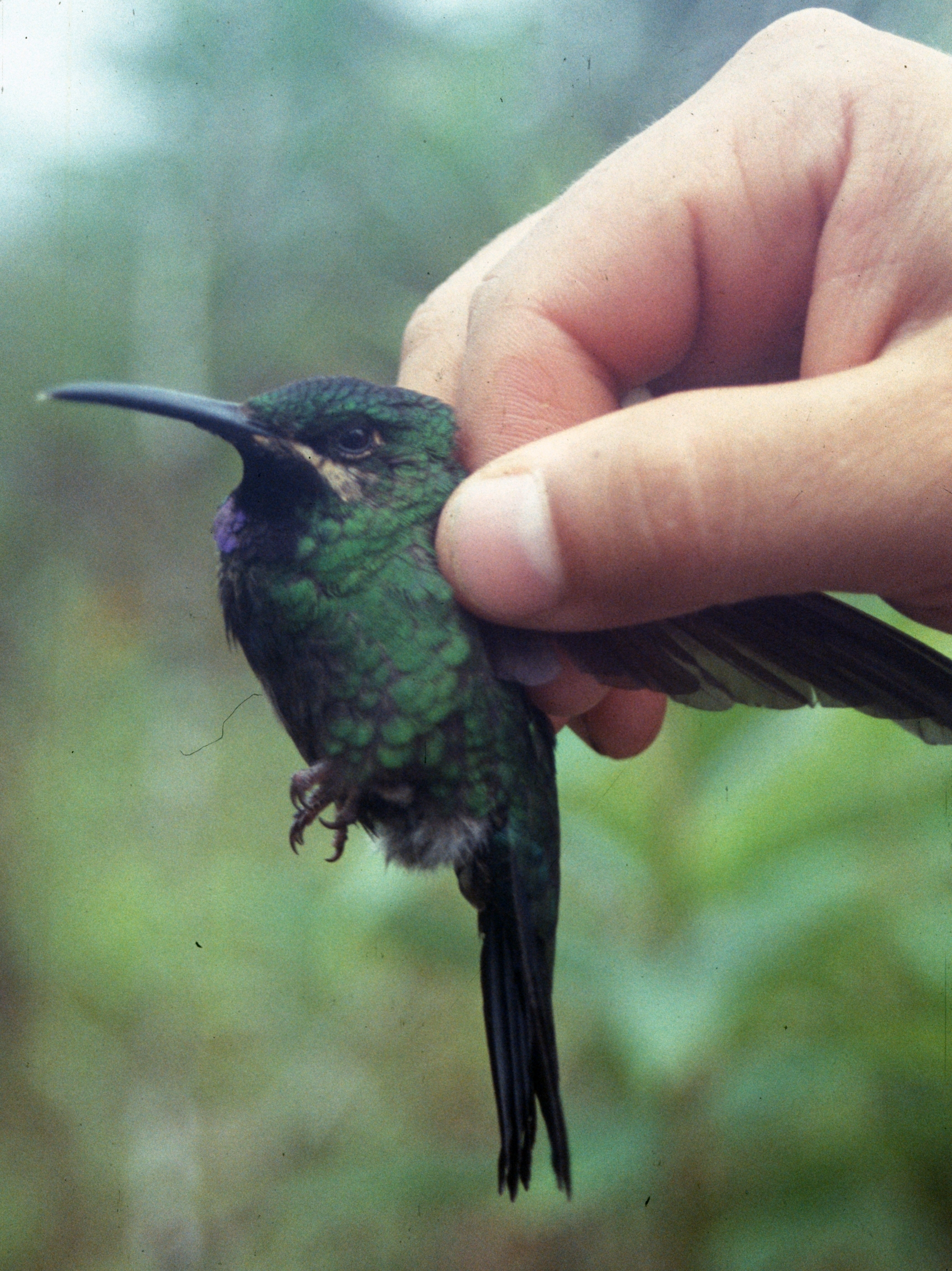
- Female from Cordillera del Cóndor, Ecuador

Conservation status
- Least Concern (IUCN 3.1)
- CITES Appendix II

Scientific classification
- Kingdom: Animalia
- Phylum: Chordata
- Class: Aves
- Order: Apodiformes
- Family: Trochilidae
- Genus: Heliodoxa
- Species: H. schreibersii

Binomial name
- Heliodoxa schreibersii (Bourcier, 1847)

= Black-throated brilliant =

Species of hummingbird

The black-throated brilliant (Heliodoxa schreibersii) is a species of hummingbird in tribe Heliantheini of subfamily Lesbiinae. It lives in Brazil, Colombia, Ecuador and Peru.

== Taxonomy and systematics ==
The taxonomy of the black-throated brilliant has not been settled. The International Ornithological Committee (IOC), the Clements taxonomy, and the South American Classification Committee of the American Ornithological Society (SACC) assign two subspecies, the nominate H. s. schreibersii and H. s. whitelyana. BirdLife International's Handbook of the Birds of the World (HBW) treats those taxa as full species, the "black-throated" and "black-breasted" brilliants respectively. In addition, for a time in the early 20th century, the two subspecies were treated as species, the only members of genus Ionolaima, which was subsequently merged into the present Heliodoxa. As of May 2022 the SACC has a proposal pending to resurrect Ionolaima but it has gained little support.

== Description ==
The nominate subspecies H. s. schreibersii of black-throated brilliant is 11.5 to 13 cm (4.5 to 5.1 in) long. Males weigh about 9.9 g (0.35 oz) and females 7.1 to 8.5 g (0.25 to 0.30 oz). Both have an almost straight dark bill about 2.8 cm (1.1 in) long and a small white spot behind the eye. The male has shining green upperparts with a glittering green forehead. Its underparts are black with a small glittering purple patch and narrow glittering green band on the lower throat. The steel blue tail is very long and deeply forked. The female's upperparts are like the male's, and in addition it has a whitish to rufous malar stripe. Its underparts are gray with bronzy green spots. Its central tail feathers are green and the tail is less deeply forked than the male's. Juveniles resemble females with a more intensely colored malar stripe.

Subspecies H. s. whitelyana is 13 to 14 cm (5.1 to 5.5 in) long, also with a 2.8 cm (1.1 in) long bill. The male's entire upperparts are shining green including the forehead. Its underparts and tail are the same as the nominate's. Females and juveniles are the same as those of the nominate subspecies.

== Distribution and habitat ==
The nominate subspecies of black-throated brilliant ranges from southeastern Colombia south through eastern Ecuador into northeastern Peru as far as San Martín Department and also east into the upper Rio Negro watershed in extreme northwestern Brazil. It inhabits the interior of mature humid forest and scrublands. In elevation it mostly ranges between 400 and 1,000 m (1,300 and 3,300 ft). However, in eastern Ecuador, it regularly but locally occurs as high as 1,450 m (4,800 ft) and occasionally up to 1,900 m (6,200 ft). In the early 2000s two individuals of this subspecies were recorded much further east in Peru than previously known. Whether they were vagrants or represent a range extension is not known. H. s. whitelyana lives in central and southeastern Peru. It inhabits humid montane forest at elevations between 600 and 1,250 m (2,000 and 4,100 ft). The map shows only the range of the nominate subspecies.

== Behavior ==
=== Movement ===
The nominate subspecies of black-throated brilliant is known to be sedentary and H. s. whitelyana is presumed to be.

=== Feeding ===
The black-throated brilliant primarily forages for nectar in the forest's understory, typically between 2 and 4 m (7 and 10 ft) high. Flowering plants of families Ericaceae and Malvaceae are among its targets. It also captures small insects by hawking from a perch.

=== Breeding ===
The breeding season of the nominate black-throated brilliant spans at least from February to May but may extend as late as October. The female incubates the clutch of two eggs. Nothing else is known about its breeding biology or that of subspecies H. s. whitelyana.

=== Vocalization ===
What is thought to be the song of the nominate black-throated brilliant is "a repeated, drawn-out, descending reeling trill of c. 4–5 seconds." It also makes single "chup" notes. The presumed song of H. s. whitelyana is a similar trill lasting about 3 seconds, but there are too few recordings to be sure if it is truly different from the nominate's.

== Status ==
The IUCN follows HBW taxonomy and so has treated the two taxa as separate species. Both are assessed of Least Concern. The population size of neither is known and both are believed to be decreasing. No immediate threats have been identified. Both taxa appear to be uncommon and patchily distributed, but there are few reliable data from which to make decisions.
