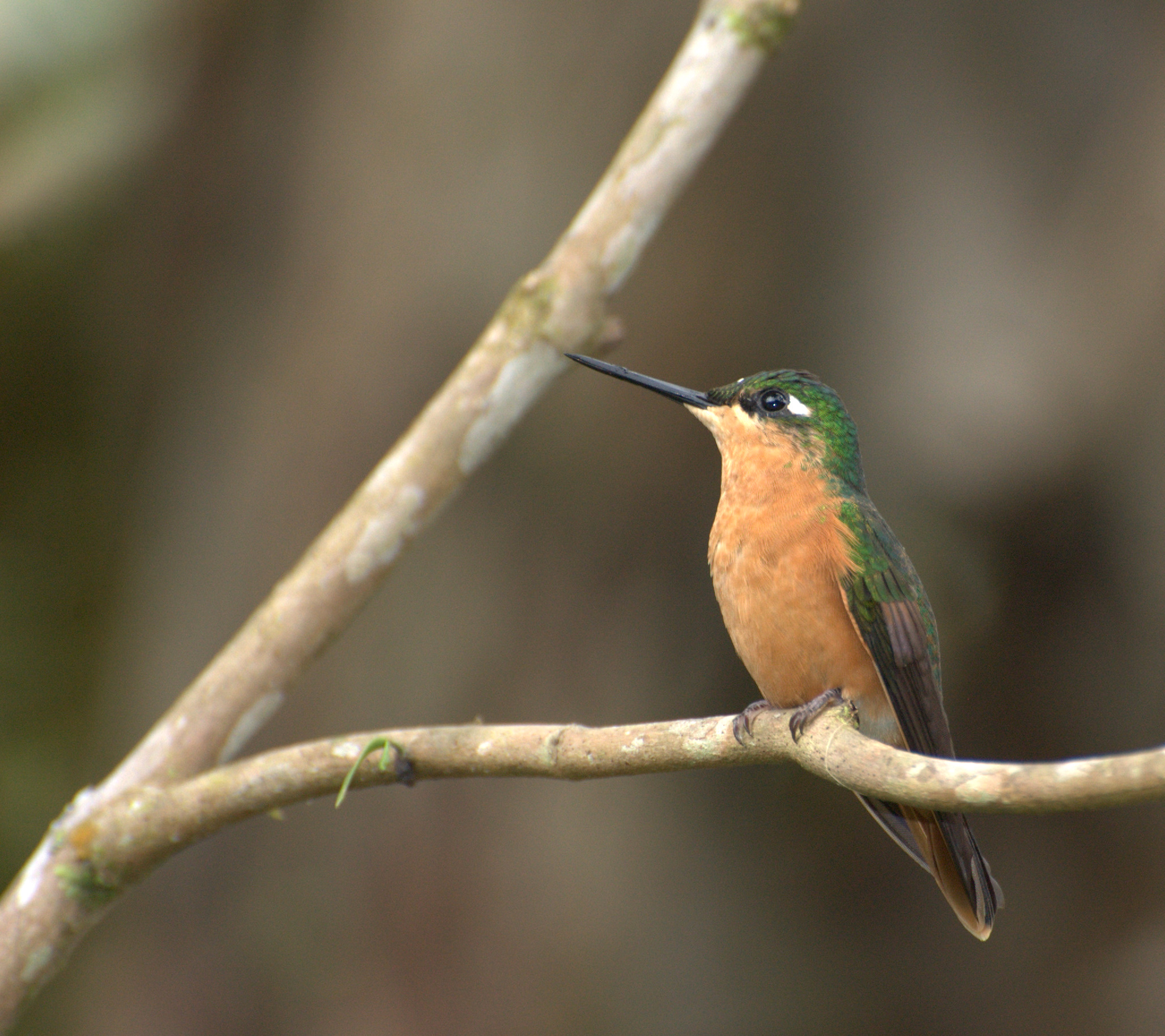
- female
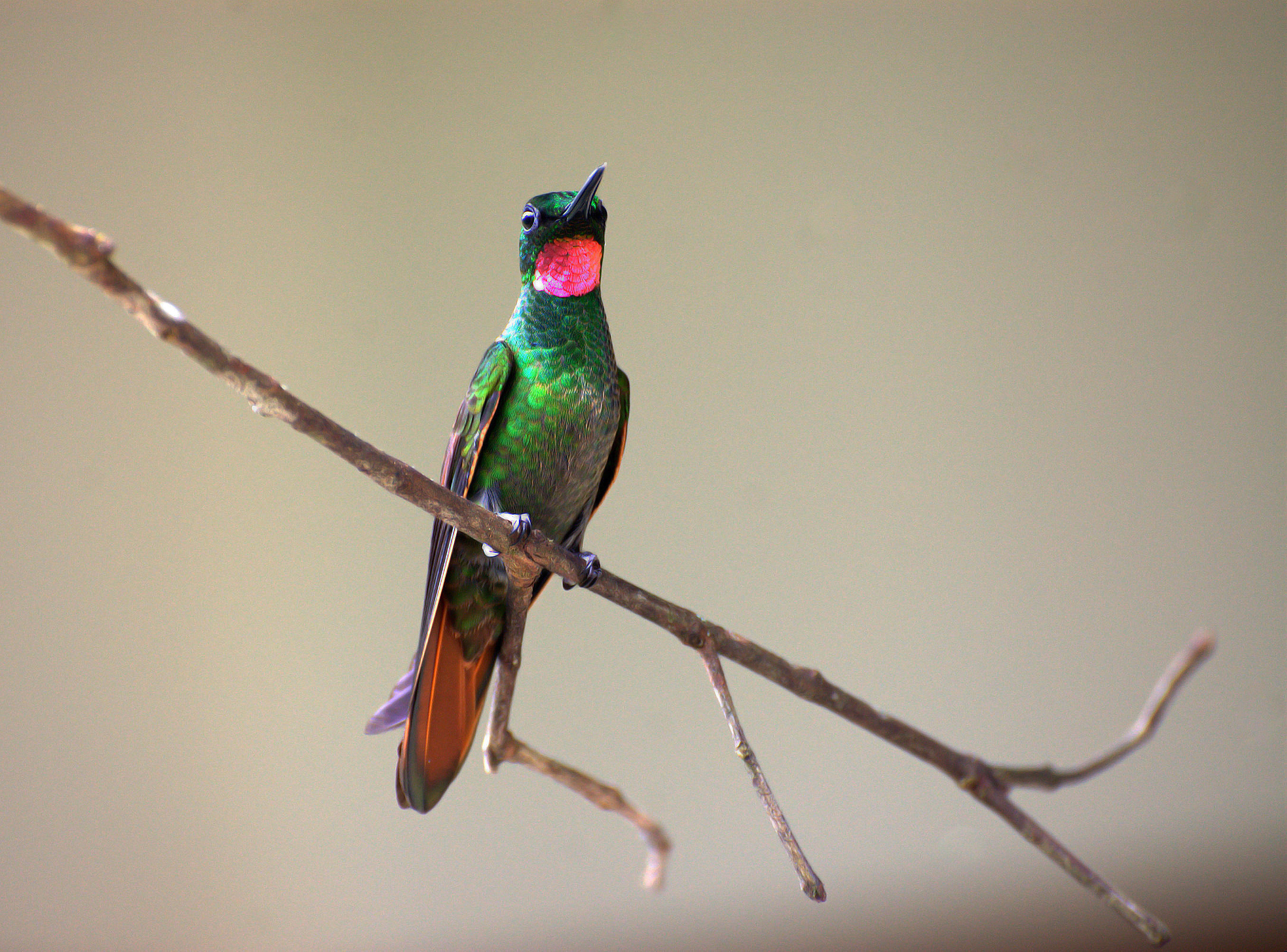
- male

Conservation status
- Least Concern (IUCN 3.1)
- CITES Appendix II

Scientific classification
- Kingdom: Animalia
- Phylum: Chordata
- Class: Aves
- Order: Apodiformes
- Family: Trochilidae
- Tribe: Heliantheini
- Genus: Heliodoxa
- Species: H. rubricauda

Binomial name
- Heliodoxa rubricauda (Boddaert, 1783)

Synonyms
- Clytolaema rubricauda (Gould, 1853)

= Brazilian ruby =

Species of hummingbird

The Brazilian ruby (Heliodoxa rubricauda) is a species of hummingbird in the "brilliants", tribe Heliantheini, in the subfamily Lesbiinae. It is endemic to Brazil.

== Taxonomy and systematics ==
The Brazilian ruby was described by the French polymath Georges-Louis Leclerc, Comte de Buffon, in 1780 in his Histoire Naturelle des Oiseaux. The bird was also illustrated in a hand-colored plate engraved by François-Nicolas Martinet in the Planches Enluminées D'Histoire Naturelle which was produced under the supervision of Edme-Louis Daubenton to accompany Buffon's text. Neither the plate caption nor Buffon's description included a scientific name but in 1783 the Dutch naturalist Pieter Boddaert coined the binomial name Trochilus rubicauda in his catalogue of the Planches Enluminées. The type locality is Rio de Janeiro in Brazil.

The Brazilian ruby was at one time the only species in the genus Clytolaema that was introduced by the ornithologist and bird artist John Gould in 1853. However, a 2014 publication provided evidence that Clytolaema is embedded within the genus Heliodoxa. The South American Classification Committee of the American Ornithological Society (SACC) and the International Ornithological Committee (IOC) adopted the change in mid-2022. As of that date the Clements taxonomy and BirdLife International's Handbook of the Birds of the World retained it in Clytolaema.

The Brazilian ruby's earlier generic name Clytolaema combined the Ancient Greek klutos meaning "glorious" and laimos meaning "throat". The specific epithet rubricauda combines the Latin ruber meaning "red" and cauda meaning "tail".

The Brazilian ruby is monotypic.

== Description ==
The Brazilian ruby is 10.8 to 11.3 cm (4.3 to 4.4 in) long. Males weigh 7 to 9.2 g (0.25 to 0.32 oz) and females 5.9 to 7.1 g (0.21 to 0.25 oz). Both sexes have a medium-length black bill and a white spot behind the eye. Adult males have an iridescent emerald green forehead and crown, a green nape, and a golden bronze back and rump. The chin is blackish, the gorget shining ruby red, the breast iridescent emerald green, and the belly dark gray with green speckles. The central tail feathers are golden bronze and the rest rufous with bronze edges. Adult females have a grass green crown and back and a cinnamon rump. Their underparts are entirely cinnamon. Their tail is like the male's. Juveniles are like females with the addition medium-lengths on the head feathers. Melanistic morph individuals are frequent.

== Distribution and habitat ==
The Brazilian ruby is found in eastern and southeastern Brazil from Bahia south to Rio Grande do Sul. It inhabits the interior of forests, scrublands, parks, and banana plantations, and is frequently seen at feeders. In elevation, it is most numerous below 500 m (1,600 ft) but ranges as high as 1,500 m (4,900 ft).

== Behavior ==
=== Movement ===
The Brazilian ruby is mostly sedentary but locally makes some seasonal elevational movements.

=== Feeding ===
The Brazilian ruby feeds on nectar from a wide variety of flowering plants and trees, both native and introduced. Males often defend feeding territories and females sometimes do. They also capture small insects by hawking from a perch.

=== Breeding ===
The Brazilian ruby's breeding season spans from November to March. It makes a cup nest of soft plant material with lichen on the outside and places it on a horizontal branch, typically 3 to 10 m (10 to 30 ft) above the ground. The female incubates the clutch of two eggs for 15 to 16 days; fledging occurs about 25 days after hatching.

=== Vocalization ===
The Brazilian ruby's song is described as "jig chrrrrrr....jig cherrrrrr...jig chrrrrrr". It also makes a "jig jig jig" call.

== Status ==
The IUCN has assessed the Brazilian ruby as being of Least Concern. Though it has a large range, its population size and trend are unknown. No immediate threats have been identified. It occurs in several protected areas, and is "[c]ommon throughout [its] range...and readily accepts man-made habitats like tree-filled gardens, parks and plantations."
