= Rubes (surname) =

Rubeš (Czech feminine: Rubešová) is the surname of:

- Jan Rubeš (1920–2009), Czech-Canadian bass opera singer and actor
- Janek Rubeš (born 1987), Czech reporter
- Martin Rubeš (born 1996), Czech fencer
- Susan Douglas Rubeš or Rubeš (1925–2013), Austrian-Canadian actress and producer
- Tomáš Rubeš (born 1992), Czech hockey player
- Vladimir Rubeš (born 1970), Australian hockey player and coach
