= PS Ruby =

PS Ruby is the name of several ships:

- PS Ruby (1841), the first iron built paddle steamer in service from the English mainland to the Isle of Wight, see Red Funnel
- PS Ruby (1861), a fast Clyde passenger steamer, later a Civil War blockade runner
- PS Ruby (1907), a historic paddle steamer preserved at Wentworth on the Murray River in Australia
