= USS Ruby =

Patrol vessel of the United States Navy

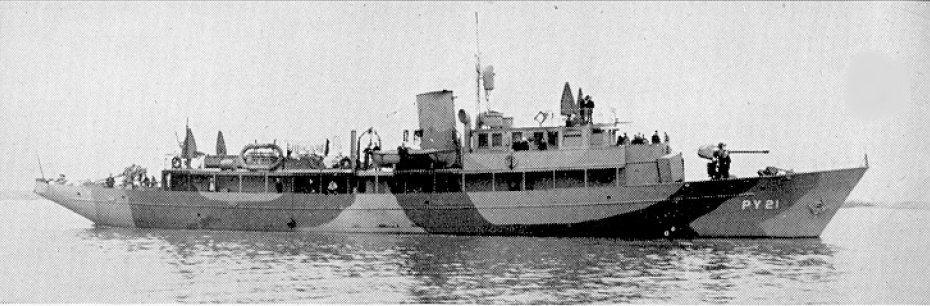
- USS Ruby (PY-21)

History

United States
- Name: Placida
- Namesake: Placida
- Builder: Bath Iron Works, Bath, Maine
- Laid down: 23 December 1929
- Launched: 17 May 1930
- Acquired: 1 July 1930
- Fate: Purchased by the Navy 19 June 1941

History

United States
- Name: Ruby
- Namesake: Ruby
- Acquired: 19 June 1941
- Commissioned: 23 September 1941
- Decommissioned: 23 July 1945
- Refit: Converted for Naval service at Gibbs Gas Engine Co., Jacksonville, Florida
- Stricken: 13 August 1945
- Identification: Hull symbol:PY-21; Code letters:NBGM
- Fate: Transferred to the Maritime Commission for disposal, 26 December 1945

General characteristics
- Type: Patrol yacht
- Displacement: 500 long tons (508 t)
- Length: 190 ft (58 m)
- Beam: 26 ft 6 in (8.08 m)
- Draft: 10 ft 11 in (3.33 m)
- Installed power: 2 × Cooper Bessemer JR-8 diesel engines; 1,600 bhp (1,200 kW)
- Propulsion: 2 × screws
- Speed: 13 knots (24 km/h; 15 mph)
- Complement: 67
- Armament: 2 × 3 in (76 mm)/50 caliber guns; 4 × 1.1 in (28 mm)/75 caliber anti-aircraft guns

USS Ruby (PY-21) was a converted yacht that patrolled with the United States Navy in World War II.

== Construction, acquisition, and commissioning ==
Placida—built as a diesel motor yacht in 1930 at Bath, Maine, by Bath Iron Works—was purchased by the Navy from H. G. Haskell on 19 June 1941; renamed Ruby and classified as a patrol vessel, PY-21, on 6 July 1941; converted at the Gibbs Gas Engine Company, Jacksonville, Florida; and commissioned on 23 September 1941.

== Service history ==
Initially assigned to the 6th Naval District at Charleston, South Carolina, for escort duty, Ruby was assigned to the Eastern Sea Frontier from 10 February 1942 to 18 January 1944, retaining her homeport of Charleston. On the 18th she was reassigned to the 3d Naval District at New York, and three days later was given to the 1st Naval District, headquartered at Boston, Mass., for training purposes.

== Decommission ==
Ruby decommissioned at Boston on 25 July 1945, was stricken from the List of Naval Vessels on 13 August 1945, and transferred to the Maritime Commission for disposal on 26 December, the day after Christmas.
