= HMS Ruby Prize =

Frigate of the Royal Navy

History

France
- Name: Entreprenante
- Builder: Brest
- Commissioned: 1693
- Captured: 7 April 1694

England
- Name: HMS Ruby Prize
- Acquired: 17 April 1694 by capture
- Fate: Sold May 1698

British East India Company
- Name: Ruby
- Acquired: May 1698 by purchase
- Fate: Foundered 1699 (Note: Hackman gives the year as 1701.)

General characteristics
- Tons burthen: 4201/94, or 450 (bm)
- Length: 108 ft 0 in (32.9 m) (gundeck); 82 ft 2 in (25.0 m) (keel)
- Beam: 31 ft 0 in (9.4 m)
- Depth of hold: 13 ft 6 in (4.1 m)
- Propulsion: Sails
- Sail plan: Full-rigged ship
- Complement: HMS; War (abroad):190; War (at home):160; Peace:120; Ruby:90
- Armament: HMS: Lower deck:18 × 9-pounder guns; Upper deck:20 × 6-pounder guns; QD:6 × 3-pounder guns; Ruby:32 guns

Ruby Prize was the French privateer Entreprenante, commissioned in 1693 at Brest, that HMS Ruby captured in 1694 and that the British Royal Navy named Ruby Prize (or Ruby's Prize), and sold in 1698. Her new owners renamed her Ruby and she left the Downs in 1699 on a voyage to Persia for the EIC. She was lost with all hands later that year at Mayota.

== Naval career ==
In 1693 French private parties acquired Entreprenante at Brest and commissioned her as a privateer of 44 guns.

HMS Ruby captured Entreprenante on 7 April 1694.

The Royal Navy purchased Entreprenante on 27 March 1695 and commissioned her as the fifth-rate Ruby Prize on 15 April 1695 under the command of Captain Thomas Elkins.

Ruby Prize was among the vessels that sailed with Admiral Russell on 27 February 1696 from the Downs. The next day she was with him on the coast of France. At the time she had 156 men aboard. She was next mentioned in an order of 2 March 1696 that ordered the named vessels to sail to the Nore and there to turn over their crews to man the "great ships' fitting out there.

In 1696 Ruby Prize was listed as a storeship at the Nore. In 1696 Captain Samuel Vincent replaced Elkins, and within the year Captain John Herne replaced Vincent.

The Royal Navy sold Ruby Prize on 24 May 1698 for £501. Apparently it required an Act of Parliament to authorize her to have the "Freedom of trading as an English-built ship".

== Merchantman ==
Richard Wells, Rotherhithe, purchased Ruby Prize and dropped the "Prize" from her name.

Captain John Barber sailed Ruby from the Downs on 28 April 1699, bound for Persia on a voyage for the EIC. Ruby foundered at Mayotte in 1699, with the loss of all hands.
