= List of First Nations peoples in Canada =

The following is a partial list of First Nations peoples of Canada, organized by linguistic-cultural area. It only includes First Nations people, which by definition excludes Métis and Canadian Inuit groups. The areas used here are in accordance to those developed by the ethnologist and linguist Edward Sapir, and used by the Canadian Museum of History.

== Northwest Coast ==
These people traditionally eat fish, primarily salmon and eulachon from the ocean, as well as fish from lakes and rivers, and roots and berries. Recently discovered clam gardens suggest that they were not limited only to hunting and gathering. They made use of the forests of the Pacific to build dug-out canoes, and houses made of evenly split planks of wood. They used tools made of stone and wood. The native peoples of the Pacific coast also make totem poles, a trait attributed to other tribes as well. In 2000 a land claim was settled between the Nisga'a people of British Columbia and the provincial government, resulting in the return of over 2,000 square kilometres of land to the Nisga'a. Major ethnicities include the:

- Coast Salish peoples
  - shíshálh (Sechelt)
  - Squamish
  - Pentlatch (a.k.a. Puntledge, extinct)
  - Qualicum
  - Comox-speaking:
    - K'omoks (Kwak'wala speaking today)
    - Tla'amin
    - Homalco
    - Klahoose
  - Halkomelem-speaking
    - Hulquminum (Island Halkomelem):
      - Hwlitsum (Lamalcha or Lamalchi)
      - Snuneymuxw (Nanaimo)
      - Snaw-naw-as (Nanoose)
      - Cowichan
        - Somena (S’amuna’)
        - Quw'utsun
        - Quamichan
        - Clemclemaluts (L’uml’umuluts)
        - Comiaken (Qwum’yiqun’)
        - Khenipsen (Hinupsum)
        - Kilpahlas (Tl’ulpalus)
        - Koksilah (Hwulqwselu)
      - Penelakut
    - Hun'qumi'num (Downriver Halkomelem)
      - Musqueam
      - Tsleil-Waututh (Burrard)
      - Katzie
      - Kwantlen
      - Kwikwetlem (Coquitlam)
      - Snokomish (extinct)
      - Tsawwassen
    - Halqemeylem (Upriver Halkomelem)
      - Sts'Ailes (Chehalis)
      - Sto:lo (Fraser River Salish)
        - Aitchelitz
        - Leq'á:mel
        - Matsqui
        - Popkum
        - Shxwhá:y
        - Skawahlook
        - Skowkale
        - Squiala
        - Sumas
        - Tzeachten
        - Yakweakwioose
        - Chawathil
        - Cheam
        - Kwaw-kwaw-Apilt
        - Sq'éwlets (Scowlitz)
        - Sqʼéwqel (Seabird Island)
        - Shxwʼōwhámél
        - Soowahlie
  - North Straits Salish-speaking
    - Songhees (a.k.a. Songish, a.k.a. Lekwungen)
    - T'Souke (Sooke)
    - Semiahmoo
    - Malahat
    - Lummi
    - Klallam
    - Tsartlip
    - Tsawout
    - Tseycum
    - Pauquachin
    - Esquimalt
- Qayqayt (New Westminster) (no language affiliation)
- Nuxálk (Bella Coola)
  - Kimsquit
  - Tallheo
  - Stuie
  - Kwatna
- Tsimshianic peoples (Northern Mainland)
  - Tsimshian (Sm'algyax speaking)
  - Gitxsan (Gitxsanimaax speaking)
  - Nisga'a
- Haida (Haad kil speaking)
- Southern Wakashan peoples
  - Nuu-chah-nulth (incorrectly called Nootka)
    - Tla-o-qui-aht (Clayoquot)
    - Mowachaht-Muchalaht
    - Ahousaht (formed from the merger of the Ahousaht and Kelsemeht bands in 1951)
    - Ehattesaht
    - Hesquiaht
    - Cheklesahht
    - Kyuquot
    - Nuchatlaht
    - Huu-ay-aht (formerly Ohiaht)
    - Hupacasath (formerly Opetchesaht)
    - Toquaht
    - Tseshaht
    - Uchucklesaht
    - Yuułuʔiłʔatḥ (Ucluelet)
  - Ditidaht
  - Pacheedaht
- Northern Wakashan peoples (Central Coast)
  - Kwakwaka'wakw
    - Laich-kwil-tach (Euclataws/Yuculta a.k.a. Southern Kwakiutl)
      - Weewaikai (Cape Mudge)
      - Wewaykum (Campbell River)
      - Kwiakah
    - Koskimo
    - 'Namgis (Nimpkish)
  - Haisla (Kitamaat)
    - Henaksiala
  - Heiltsuk (Bella Bella, at the community of the same name)
  - Wuikinuxv (Owekeeno)
- Tsetsaut (extinct Athapaskan-speakers)

== Plains ==
These people traditionally used tipis covered with skins as their homes. Their main sustenance was the bison, which they used as food, as well as for all their garments. The leaders of some Plains tribes wore large headdresses made of feathers, something which is wrongfully attributed by some to all First Nations peoples. Major ethnicities include the:

- Anishinaabe
  - Plains-Ojibwa
- Blackfoot
  - Kainai (Blood)
  - Piikani (North Peigan)
  - Siksika
- Dene
  - Chipewyan
- Dakota
  - Mdewakanton
  - Sisseton
  - Wahpekute
  - Wahpeton
  - Yanktonai
- Lakota
  - Hunkpapa
- Nakota
  - Assiniboine
  - Stoney
- Plains-Cree
- Tsuut'ina (Sarcee)

== Plateau ==
- Ktunaxa (Kootenay)
- Syilx (Okanagan)
- Sinixt
- St'at'imc (Lillooet)
  - Lil'wat
  - Lower Stl'atl'imx (Skatin, Semahquam, Xa'xtsa)
  - Nequatque
- Nicola
- Nicola Athapaskans (extinct)
- Nlaka'pamux (Thompson)
- Secwepemc (Shuswap)

== Western subarctic ==
These peoples live in the boreal forest in what are now Canada's western provinces and territories. They were originally hunter-gatherers dependent on caribou, moose and the fur trade. Most spoke Athapaskan languages except the Crees and Inland Tlingit. Major ethnicities in the Yukon, Northwest Territories and the northern parts of the western provinces (British Columbia, Alberta, Saskatchewan and Manitoba) include the following:

- Cree
- Dakelh (Carrier)
  - Wet'suwet'en
  - Lheidli T'enneh
- Dene
  - Chipewyan
  - Sahtu (includes Bearlake, Hare and Mountain peoples)
  - Slavey
  - Tłı̨chǫ
  - Yellowknives
- Dane-zaa (also Dunne-za, Beaver, Tasttine)
- Gwich'in (Kutchin, Loucheaux)
- Hän
- Kaska
- Sekani
- Tagish
- Tahltan
- Inland Tlingit
  - Áa Tlein Kwáan (Atlin people)
  - Deisleen Kwáan (Teslin people)
- Tsilhqot'in (Chilcotin)
- Southern and Northern Tutchone

== Woodlands and eastern subarctic ==
Major ethnicities include the:

- Abenaki
- Anishinaabe
  - Algonquin
  - Nipissing
  - Ojibwa
    - Mississaugas
    - Saulteaux
  - Odawa (Ottawa)
  - Oji-cree
  - Potawatomi
- Cree
- Innu
- Naskapi

=== Atlantic coastal region ===
- Beothuk (Newfoundland extinct)
- Innu (Labrador)
- Wolastoqiyik
- Mi'kmaq (Micmac)
- Passamaquoddy
- Hydin

=== St. Lawrence River Valley ===
The largest First Nations group near the St. Lawrence waterway are the Anishinaabe. This area also includes the Wyandot (formerly referred to as the Huron) peoples of central Ontario, and the Haudenosaunee or League of Six Nations who had lived in the United States, south of Lake Ontario. Major ethnicities include the:

- Anishinaabe
  - Algonquin
  - Nipissing
- Haudenosaunee (Iroquois)
  - Mohawk (Kanien'kehá:ka)
  - Oneida (Onʌyoteˀa·ká·)
  - Onondaga (Onoñda’gegá’)
  - Cayuga (Gayogo̱hó꞉nǫʼ)
  - Seneca (Onöndowa'ga:')
  - Tuscarora (Skarù:ręˀ)
- Munsee branch of the Lenape (Delawares)
- Neutral
- Petun (Tobacco)
- Wyandot (Huron)

== See also ==
- Classification of the Indigenous peoples of the Americas
- Indigenous languages of the Americas
- Indigenous peoples in Canada
- List of Canadian Inuit
- List of First Nations governments
- List of Indian reserves in Canada
- List of Indian reserves in Canada by population
- List of organizations that self-identify as FNIM governments
- List of place names in Canada of Aboriginal origin
- Notable Aboriginal people of Canada
