= List of First Nations band governments =

The following is a partial list of First Nations band governments in Canada:

== Alberta ==
- Alexander First Nation
- Alexis Nakota Sioux First Nation
- Athabasca Chipewyan First Nation
- Bearspaw First Nation
- Beaver First Nation
- Beaver Lake Cree Nation
- Bigstone Cree Nation
- Chiniki Nation
- Chipewyan Prairie First Nation
- Cold Lake First Nations
- Dene Tha' First Nation
- Driftpile First Nation
- Duncan's First Nation
- Enoch Cree Nation
- Ermineskin Cree Nation
- Fort McKay First Nation
- Fort McMurray First Nation
- Frog Lake First Nation
- Heart Lake First Nation
- Horse Lake First Nation
- Kainai Nation
- Kapawe'no First Nation
- Kehewin Cree Nation
- Little Red River Cree Nation
- Loon River First Nation
- Louis Bull Band
- Lubicon Lake Indian Nation
- Mikisew Cree First Nation
- Montana First Nation
- O'Chiese First Nation
- Paul First Nation
- Peerless Trout First Nation
- Piikani Nation
- Saddle Lake Cree Nation
- Samson Cree Nation
- Sawridge First Nation
- Siksika Nation
- Smith's Landing First Nation
- Stoney Nation
- Sturgeon Lake Cree Nation
- Sucker Creek First Nation
- Sunchild First Nation
- Swan River First Nation
- Tallcree First Nation
- Tsuu T'ina Nation
- Wesley First Nation
- Whitefish Lake First Nation (Atikameg)
- Whitefish Lake First Nation (Goodfish)
- Woodland Cree First Nation

== Atlantic Canada ==
=== Newfoundland and Labrador ===
- Miawpukek First Nation
- Mushuau Innu First Nation
- Qalipu First Nation
- Sheshatshiu Innu First Nation

=== New Brunswick ===
- Bilijk First Nation
- Eel Ground First Nation
- Eel River Bar First Nation
- Elsipogtog First Nation
- Esgenoôpetitj First Nation (Burnt Church First Nation)
- Fort Folly First Nation
- Madawaska Maliseet First Nation
- Metepenagiag Mi'kmaq Nation
- Oromocto First Nation
- Pabineau First Nation
- St. Mary's First Nation
- Tobique First Nation
- Woodstock First Nation

=== Nova Scotia ===
- Annapolis Valley First Nation
- Bear River First Nation
- Eskasoni First Nation
- Glooscap First Nation
- Membertou First Nation
- Millbrook First Nation
- Paq'tnkek First Nation
- Potlotek First Nation
- Pictou Landing First Nation
- Sipekne'katik First Nation
- Wagmatcook First Nation
- Wasoqopa'q First Nation
- We'koqma'q First Nation

=== Prince Edward Island ===
- Abegweit First Nation
- Lennox Island First Nation

== British Columbia ==
- Ahousaht First Nation
- Aitchelitz Band
- Beecher Bay First Nation
- Blueberry River First Nation
- Bridge River Indian Band
- Campbell River First Nation
- Cayoose Creek Band
- Chawathil First Nation
- Cheam Indian Band
- Ch'iyáqtel First Nation
- Cowichan Tribes
- Ditidaht First Nation
- Ehattesaht First Nation
- Esquimault Nation
- Gwa'sala-'Nakwaxda'xw Nation
- Halalt First Nation
- Heiltsuk Nation
- Hesquiaht First Nation
- Hupacasath First Nation
- Huu-ay-aht First Nation
- Ka:'yu:'k't'h'/Che:k:tles7et'h' First Nations
- K'ómoks First Nation
- Kwantlen First Nation
- Kwaw-kwaw-a-pilt First Nation
- Ḵwiḵwa̱sut'inux̱w Ha̱xwa'mis
- Lax-kw'alaams First Nation
- Leq'á:mel First Nation
- Lil'wat First Nation
- Lyackson First Nations
- Malahat Indian Band
- Matsqui First Nation
- Mowachaht/Muchalaht First Nations
- Musqueam First Nation
- 'Namgis First Nation
- Nanoose First Nation
- Nuchatlaht First Nation
- Nuxalk First Nation
- Old Massett Village Council
- Pacheedaht First Nation
- Pauquachin First Nation
- Penelakut Indian Band
- Popkum Band
- Qualicum First Nation
- Quatsino First Nation
- Scia'new First Nation
- Seabird Island Band
- Semiahmoo First Nation
- Seton Lake Indian Band
- shíshálh Nation
- Shxwhá:y Village
- Shxw'ow'hamel First Nation
- Simpcw First Nation
- Sinixt First Nation
- Skawahlook First Nation
- Skidegate Band Council
- Skowkale First Nation
- Skwah First Nation
- Snuneymuxw First Nation
- Songhees First Nation
- Soowahlie First Nation
- Sq'éwlets First Nation
- Squamish Nation
- Squiala First Nation
- Stzʼuminus First Nation
- Sumas First Nation
- T'it'q'et First Nation
- Tsʼuubaa-asatx Nation
- Tk’emlups te Secwepemc
- Tla-o-qui-aht First Nations
- Toquaht First Nation
- Tsartlip First Nation
- Tsawout First Nation
- Tseshaht First Nation
- Tseycum First Nation
- Ts'kw'aylaxw First Nation
- Tsleil-Waututh First Nation
- T'sou-ke Nation
- Uchucklesaht Tribe
- Westbank First Nation
- We Wai Kai Nation
- Xats'ull First Nation
- Yakweakwioose First Nation
- Yuułuʔiłʔatḥ Government

== Manitoba ==
- Pimicikamak government
- Barren Lands First Nation
- Berens River First Nation
- Birdtail Sioux First Nation
- Bloodvein First Nation
- Brokenhead Ojibway Nation
- Buffalo Point First Nation
- Bunibonibee Cree Nation
- Canupawakpa Dakota First Nation
- Chemawawin Cree Nation
- Cross Lake First Nation
- Dakota Plains First Nation
- Dakota Tipi First Nation
- Dauphin River First Nation
- Ebb and Flow First Nation
- Fisher River Cree Nation
- Fox Lake Cree Nation
- Gamblers First Nation
- Garden Hill First Nation
- God's Lake First Nation
- Grand Rapids First Nation
- Hollow Water First Nation
- Keeseekoowenin Ojibway First Nation
- Kinonjeoshtegon First Nation
- Lake Manitoba First Nation
- Lake St. Martin First Nation
- Little Black River First Nation
- Little Grand Rapids First Nation
- Little Saskatchewan First Nation
- Manto Sipi Cree Nation
- Marcel Colomb First Nation
- Mathias Colomb First Nation
- Mosakahiken Cree Nation
- Nisichawayasihk Cree Nation
- Northlands First Nation
- Norway House Cree Nation
- O-Chi-Chak-Ko-Sipi First Nation
- Opaskwayak Cree Nation
- Pauingassi First Nation
- Peguis First Nation
- Pinaymootang First Nation
- Pine Creek First Nation
- Poplar River First Nation
- Red Sucker Lake First Nation
- Rolling River First Nation
- Roseau River Anishinabe First Nation
- Sagkeeng First Nation
- Sandy Bay First Nation
- Sapotaweyak Cree Nation
- Sayisi Dene First Nation
- Shamattawa First Nation
- Sioux Valley Dakota Nation
- Skownan First Nation
- St. Theresa Point First Nation
- Swan Lake First Nation
- Tataskweyak Cree Nation
- Tootinaowaziibeeng First Nation
- War Lake First Nation
- Wasagamack First Nation
- Waterhen Lake First Nation
- Waywayseecappo First Nation
- York Factory First Nation

== Northern Canada ==
=== Northwest Territories ===
- Acho Dene Koe First Nation
- Aklavik First Nation
- Behdzi Ahda' First Nation
- Dechi Laot'i First Nations
- Deh Gáh Got'ı̨ę First Nation
- Délı̨nę First Nation
- Deninu Kųę́ First Nation
- Dog Rib Rae First Nation
- Fort Good Hope First Nation
- Gameti First Nation
- Gwichya Gwich'in First Nation
- Inuvik Native Band
- Jean Marie River First Nation
- K'atlodeeche First Nation
- Ka'a'gee Tu First Nation
- Łı́ı́dlı̨ı̨ Kų́ę́ First Nation
- Łutsël K'é Dene First Nation
- Nahɂą Dehé Dene Band
- Pehdzeh Ki First Nation
- Salt River First Nation
- Sambaa K'e First Nation
- Tetlit Gwich'in First Nation
- Tulita Dene First Nation
- West Point First Nation
- Wha Ti First Nation
- Yellowknives Dene First Nation

=== Nunavut ===
There are no First Nations band governments in Nunavut.

=== Yukon ===
- Carcross/Tagish First Nation
- Champagne and Aishihik First Nations
- First Nation of Na-Cho Nyäk Dun
- Kluane First Nation
- Kwanlin Dün First Nation
- Liard River First Nation
- Little Salmon/Carmacks First Nation
- Ross River Dena Council
- Selkirk First Nation
- Ta'an Kwach'an Council
- Teslin Tlingit Council
- Tr’ondëk Hwëch’in First Nation
- Vuntut Gwitchin First Nation
- White River First Nation

== Ontario ==
- Aamjiwnaang First Nation
- Albany First Nation
- Alderville First Nation
- Algonquins of Pikwàkanagàn First Nation
- Animbiigoo Zaagi'igan Anishinaabek
- Anishinabe of Wauzhushk Onigum Nation
- Anishnaabeg of Naongashiing (Big Island First Nation)
- Aroland First Nation
- Asubpeeschoseewagong First Nation (Grassy Narrows First Nation)
- Atikameksheng Anishnawbek First Nation (Whitefish Lake First Nation)
- Attawapiskat First Nation
- Aundeck-Omni-Kaning First Nation
- Batchewana First Nation
- Bearfoot Onondaga First Nation
- Bearskin Lake First Nation
- Beaverhouse First Nation
- Beausoleil First Nation
- Big Grassy First Nation
- Biinjitiwaabik Zaaging Anishinaabek First Nation
- Biigtigong Nishnaabeg (Ojibways of the Pic River First Nation)
- Bingwi Neyaashi Anishinaabek First Nation (Sand Point First Nation)
- Brunswick House First Nation
- Bkejwanong Territory First Nation
- Caldwell First Nation
- Cat Lake First Nation
- Chapleau Cree First Nation
- Chapleau Ojibway First Nation
- Chippewa of the Thames First Nation
- Chippewas of Georgina Island First Nation
- Chippewas of Kettle and Stony Point
- Chippewas of Mnjikaning First Nation (Rama)
- Chippewas of Nawash
- Chippewas of Rama First Nation
- Chippewas of Saugeen
- Constance Lake First Nation
- Couchiching First Nation
- Curve Lake First Nation
- Deer Lake First Nation
- Delaware Nation at Moraviantown
- Dokis First Nation
- Eabametoong First Nation
- Eagle Lake First Nation
- Flying Post First Nation
- Fort Albany First Nation
- Fort Severn First Nation
- Fort William First Nation
- Gakijiwanong Anishinaabe Nation (Lac La Croix First Nation)
- Garden River First Nation
- Ginoogaming First Nation
- Gull Bay First Nation
- Hiawatha First Nation
- Hornepayne First Nation
- Iskatewizaagegan 39 Independent First Nation
- Kasabonika Lake First Nation
- Kashechewan First Nation
- Keewaywin First Nation
- Kingfisher First Nation
- Kitchenuhmaykoosib Inninuwug First Nation
- Konadaha Seneca First Nation
- Lac Des Mille Lacs First Nation
- Lac Seul First Nation
- Long Lake 58 First Nation
- Lower Cayuga First Nation
- Lower Mohawk First Nation
- M'Chigeeng First Nation
- Magnetawan First Nation
- Ginoogaming First Nation
- Asubpeeschoseewagong First Nation (Grassy Narrows First Nation)
- Gull Bay First Nation
- Marten Falls First Nation
- Matachewan First Nation
- Mattagami First Nation
- McDowell Lake First Nation
- M'Chigeeng First Nation
- Michipicoten First Nation
- Mishkeegogamang First Nation
- Missanabie Cree First Nation
- Mississauga First Nation
- Mississaugas of Scugog Island
- Mississaugas of the Credit First Nation
- Mohawks of the Bay of Quinte First Nation
- Mocreebec Indian Government
- Mitaanjigamiing First Nation
- Mohawks of Akwesasne
- Moose Cree First Nation
- Moose Deer Point First Nation
- Moravian of the Thames First Nation
- Munsee-Delaware Nation
- Muskrat Dam Lake First Nation
- Naicatchewenin First Nation
- Namaygoosisagagun First Nation
- Naotkamegwanning First Nation
- Neskantaga First Nation
- Netmizaaggamig Nishnaabeg (Pic Mobert)
- Nibinamik First Nation
- Nigigoonsiminikaaning First Nation
- Niisaachewan Anishinaabe Nation
- Nipissing First Nation
- Niharondasa Seneca First Nation
- Nipissing First Nation
- North Caribou Lake First Nation
- North Spirit Lake First Nation
- Northwest Angle 33 First Nation
- Northwest Angle 37 First Nation
- Obashkaandagaang First Nation
- Ojibways of Batchewana
- Ojibways of Garden River
- Ojibways of Onigaming First Nation
- Ojibways of Sucker Creek
- Oneida Nation of the Thames
- Onondaga Clear Sky First Nation
- Pays Plat First Nation
- Pikangikum First Nation
- Poplar Hill First Nation
- Poplar Point First Nation
- Rainy River First Nations
- Red Rock Indian Band (Lake Helen First Nation)
- Sachigo Lake First Nation
- Sagamok Anishnawbek First Nation
- Sandy Lake First Nation
- Saugeen First Nation
- Seine River First Nation
- Serpent River First Nation
- Shawanaga First Nation
- Sheguiandah First Nation
- Sheshegwaning First Nation
- Shoal Lake 40 First Nation
- Six Nations of the Grand River
  - Six Nations of the Grand River Elected Council
- Slate Falls First Nation
- Stanjikoming First Nation
- Taykwa Tagamou First Nation
- Temagami First Nation
- Thessalon First Nation
- Tuscarora First Nation
- Upper Cayuga First Nation
- Upper Mohawk First Nation
- Wabaseemoong Independent Nations
- Wabauskang First Nation
- Wabigoon Lake Ojibway Nation
- Wahgoshig First Nation
- Wahnapitae First Nation
- Wahta Mohawks
- Walker Mohawk First Nation
- Walpole Island First Nation
- Wapekeka First Nation
- Wasauksing First Nation
- Wawakapewin First Nation
- Washagamis Bay First Nation
- Wauzhushk Onigum First Nation
- Wawakapewin First Nation
- Webequie First Nation
- Weenusk First Nation
- Whitefish River First Nation
- Whitesand First Nation
- Whitewater Lake First Nation
- Wikwemikong Unceded First Nation
- Wunnumin Lake First Nation
- Zhiibaahaasing First Nation

== Quebec ==
- Abitibiwinni First Nation (Première Nation Abitibiwinni)
- Algonquins of Barriere Lake
- Atikamekw of Opitciwan
- Atikamekw of Manawan
- Atikamekw of Wemotaci (Conseil des Atikamekw de Wemotaci)
- Cree Nation of Chisasibi
- Cree Nation of Eastmain
- Cree Nation of Mistissini
- Cree Nation of Nemaska
- Cree Nation of Mistissini
- Cree Nation of Waskaganish (The Crees of the Waskaganish First Nation)
- Cree Nation of Wemindji
- Gaspé First Nation (La Nation Micmac de Gespeg)
- Innue Essipit
- Innu Nation of Matimekush-Lac John
- Innu Takuaikan Uashat Mak Mani-Utenam
- Innus of Ekuanitshit
- Innus of Nutashkuan First Nation
- Innus of Unamen Shipu
- Kebaowek First Nation
- Kitcisakik Anicinape Community (Communauté anicinape de Kitcisakik)
- Kitigan Zibi Anishinabeg
- Listuguj Mi'gmaq First Nation
- Long Point First Nation
- Micmacs of Gesgapegiag
- Mohawk Nation at Akwesasne
- Mohawks of Kahnawà:ke
- Mohawks of Kanesatake
- Montagnais de Pakua Shipi
- Naskapi Nation of Kawawachikamach
- Nation Anishinabe du Lac-Simon
- Nemaska First Nation
- Odanak First Nation
- Oujé-Bougoumou First Nation
- Pekuakamiulnuatsh First Nation
- Pessamit Innu Band
- Timiskaming First Nation
- Waswanipi First Nation
- Wemindji First Nation
- Wemotaci First Nation
- Wendat Nation (Nation Wendat)
- Whapmagoostui First Nation
- Wolastoqiyik Wahsipekuk First Nation (Maliseet Viger 1 First Nation)
- Wolf Lake First Nation
- Wôlinak First Nation (Première Nation des Abénakis de Wôlinak)

== Saskatchewan ==
- Ahtahkakoop First Nation
- Beardy's & Okemasis First Nation
- Big Island Lake Cree Nation
- Big River First Nation
- Birch Narrows First Nation
- Black Lake Dene Nation
- Buffalo River Dene Nation
- Canoe Lake Cree Nation
- Carry the Kettle Nakoda First Nation
- Chacachas First Nation
- Chakastapaysin Band of the Cree Nation
- Clearwater River Dene Nation
- Coté First Nation
- Cowessess First Nation
- Cumberland House Cree Nation
- Day Star First Nation
- English River First Nation
- Fishing Lake First Nation
- Flying Dust First Nation
- Fond du Lac Dene Nation
- Gordon First Nation
- Hatchet Lake Dene Nation
- Island Lake First Nation
- James Smith First Nation
- Joseph Bighead First Nation
- Kahkewistahaw First Nation
- Kawacatoose First Nation
- Keeseekoose First Nation
- Key First Nation
- Kinistin Saulteaux Nation
- Lac La Ronge First Nation
- Little Black Bear First Nation
- Little Pine First Nation
- Lucky Man Cree Nation
- Makwa Sahgaiehcan First Nation
- Mistawasis First Nation
- Montreal Lake Cree Nation
- Moosomin First Nation
- Mosquito-Grizzly Bear's Head,-Lean Man First Nation
- Muscowpetung First Nation
- Muskeg Lake First Nation
- Muskoday First Nation
- Muskowekwan First Nation
- Nekaneet First Nation
- Ocean Man First Nation
- Ochapowace First Nation
- Okanese First Nation
- One Arrow First Nation
- Onion Lake Cree Nation
- Pasqua First Nation
- Peepeekisis First Nation
- Pelican Lake First Nation
- Peter Ballantyne Cree Nation
- Peter Chapman First Nation
- Pheasant Rump Nakota First Nation
- Piapot First Nation
- Poundmaker Cree Nation
- Red Earth First Nation
- Red Pheasant First Nation
- Sakimay First Nation
- Saulteaux First Nation
- Standing Buffalo First Nation
- Star Blanket Cree Nation
- Sturgeon Lake First Nation
- Sweetgrass First Nation
- Thunderchild First Nation
- Wahpeton Dakota Nation
- Waterhen Lake First Nation
- White Bear First Nation
- Whitecap Dakota/Sioux First Nation
- Witchekan Lake First Nation
- Wood Mountain Dakota Sioux Nation
- Yellow Quill First Nation

== See also ==
Americas

- Classification of the Indigenous peoples of the Americas
- List of traditional territories of the Indigenous peoples of North America

Canada

- List of Canadian Aboriginal leaders
- List of First Nations peoples
- List of Indian reserves in Canada
- List of Indian reserves in Canada by population
- List of organizations that self-identify as FNIM governments
- List of place names in Canada of Aboriginal origin

United States

- Federally recognized tribes
- Self-identified tribes
- Native Americans in the United States
- List of Alaska Native tribal entities
- List of Indian reservations in the United States
- List of historical Indian reservations in the United States
- National Park Service Native American Heritage Sites
- Outline of United States federal Indian law and policy
- State-recognized tribes in the United States
- Category:Inuit peoples
