= List of Halkomelem-speaking peoples =

This is a list of indigenous peoples speaking Halkomelem, or who did so historically (as most living members of those peoples no longer speak them). The term Halkomelem people has been used by certain linguists to mean "Halkomelem-speaking peoples" but such a group does not exist as an ethnicity or band or other group:

== Hunquminum (Downriver dialect) ==
Peoples who spoke Downriver Halkomelem lived from the Stave River westwards to the mouth of the Fraser, and included the Tsleil-waututh on Burrard Inlet.

- Tsleil-Waututh (Burrards)
- Musqueam (Hmethkwyem)
- Kwantlen
- Katzie
- Kwikwetlem
- Snokomish
- Tsawwassen

== Hulquminum (Island dialect) ==
Hulquminum or Island Halkomelem was spoken on the other side of Georgia Strait, and is most identified with the

- Cowichan
  - the Cowichan designation is derived from the name of one of several groups forming the Cowichan Tribes band government, the Quwutsun, whose geographic focus is the Cowichan Valley, but other Halkomelem-speakers in the area were also considered Cowichan; the Snaw-na-ass (Nanoose Bay) and Sneneymux (Nanaimo) peoples were Hulquminum speakers were separate from the Cowichan. In the 19th century this term or the variant "Cowidgin" was applied to all Halkomelem-speaking groups and certain others such as the Skwxwu7mesh and Semiahmoo. On Vancouver Island and the Gulf Islands, other Cowichan groups are such as the Halalt, Malahat, Penelakut, Lyackson and Lamalcha.
- Lake Cowichan
- Malahat (the MÁLEXEȽ speak both Hulquminum and SENĆOŦEN (Saanich), and have their own dialect called Malchosen
- Halalt
- Lamalcha (Hwlitsum)
- Lyackson
- Pauquachin, the BOḰEĆEN also speak SENĆOŦEN
- Penelakut
- Stz'uminus (Chemainus)
- Snaw-naw-as (originally this term was used for both the Snuneymuxw/Nanaimo and the group that today uses this name, at Nanoose Bay)
- Qualicum
- Snuneymuxw (Nanaimo)
- Scia'new (Beecher Bay Band)

== Halqemeylem (Upriver dialect) ==
Halqemeylem or Upriver Halkomelem was spoken by peoples from the Stave River upstream to the lower reaches of the Fraser Canyon at Yale and environs.

- Aitchelitz
- Chawathil
- Cheam
- Leq' a: mel
- Matsqui
- Popkum
- Seabird Island
- Skawahlook (Tait)
- Shxw'ow'hamel
- Skway (Shxwhá:y)
- Skowkale
- Skwah
- Soowahlie
- Stó:lō
- Sts'Ailes (Chehalis, BC)
- Sumas
- Tsleil-Waututh (Burrards)
- Tzeachten
- Yakweakwioose

== See also ==
- List of Lushootseed-speaking peoples
