= Pekwʼxe꞉yles =

First Nation reserve in British Columbia, Canada

Coordinates: 49°08′29″N 122°16′20″W

Pekwʼxe꞉yles or Peckquaylis /pɛkˈweɪlɪs/ is an Indian reserve on the north bank of the Fraser River in Mission, British Columbia, Canada, located between Lower Hatzic Slough and D'Herbomez Creek.

Pekwʼxe꞉yles is 10.3 hectares large. The Fraser Valley Child Development Centre has satellite offices on the reserve.

== History ==
The reserve was reinstated in June 2005 by Order in Council. It sits on the former site of St. Mary's Indian Residential School. The 2023 three-day Walk in the Spirit of Reconciliation concluded at the St. Mary's Indian Residential School site in Mission on the Pekw'Xe:yles Reserve.

== First Nations bands ==
The reserve is used by 21 First Nation band governments. They are as follows.

1. Aitchelitz
2. Chawathil
3. Cheam First Nation
4. Kwantlen First Nation
5. Kwaw-kwaw-Apilt
6. Leq'á:mel First Nation
7. Matsqui First Nation
8. Popkum First Nation
9. Seabird Island
10. Shxw'ow'hamel First Nation
11. Shxwhá:y Village
12. Skawahlook First Nation
13. Skowkale
14. Skwah First Nation
15. Soowahlie
16. Sq'éwlets
17. Squiala First Nation
18. Sts'ailes
19. Sumas First Nation
20. Tzeachten
21. Yakweakwioose

== See also ==
- St. Mary's Indian Residential School
- Fraser Valley Heritage Park
