= Stó꞉lō Nation Chiefs Council =

Canadian First Nations Tribal council

The Stó꞉lō Nation Chiefs Council is a First Nations tribal council in the Fraser Valley region of the Canadian province of British Columbia that is the tribal council for First Nations band governments in the area of Chilliwack, Abbotsford and at Nicomen Island. This tribal council should not be confused with the Stó꞉lō Tribal Council, which is composed of different bands of the Stó꞉lō people. Many Stó꞉lō communities and their governments are not in either tribal council.

== Member governments ==
- Aitchelitz First Nation
- Leq'á:mel First Nation
- Matsqui First Nation
- Popkum First Nation
- Shxwhá:y Village First Nation
- Sq'ewá:lxw First Nation
- Skowkale First Nation
- Squiala First Nation
- Sumas First Nation
- Ch’íyáqtel First Nation
- Yakweakwioose First Nation

== History ==
In 1977 twenty-four Stó:lō First Nations banded together to sign the Stó:lō Declaration and creating the Stó:lō Nation Chiefs Council. By 1995 when the BC Treaty Process started three First Nations had left the Sto:lo Nation. By 2005 two more nations had left leaving 19 First Nations.

In 2005, these 19 Sto:lo First Nations that remained in the Sto:lo Nation underwent an internal re-organization, eventually forming two tribal councils. Eleven of these First Nations stayed in the Sto:lo Nation Chiefs Council: Aitchelitz, Leq'a:mel, Matsqui, Popkum, Shxwhá:y Village, Skawahlook, Skowkale, Squiala, Sumas, Tzeachten, and Yakweakwioose.

Eight others formed a new tribal council called the Sto:lo Tribal Council:

- Chawathil First Nation
- Cheam Indian Band
- Kwantlen First Nation
- Kwaw-kwaw-Apilt First Nation
- Sq'éwlets First Nation
- Seabird Island First Nation
- Shxw'ow'hamel First Nation
- Soowahlie First Nation

== See also ==
- Stó꞉lō Tribal Council
- Halkomelem
- List of tribal councils in British Columbia
