= Chilliwack—Hope (federal electoral district) =

Federal electoral district in British Columbia, Canada

British Columbia electoral district
- Interactive map of riding boundaries from the 2025 federal election. Points indicate the communities of Chilliwack and Hope.

Federal electoral district
- Legislature: House of Commons
MP
Mark Strahl
Conservative
- District created: 2013
- First contested: 2015
- Last contested: 2025
- District webpage: profile, map

Demographics
- Population (2011): 92,734
- Electors (2019): 82,178
- Area (km²): 3,355
- Pop. density (per km²): 27.6
- Census division: Fraser Valley Regional District
- Census subdivision(s): Chilliwack, Hope, Kent (part), Tzeachten, Skowkale, Seabird Island, Kwawkwawapilt, Soowahlie, Skwah, Cheam

Chilliwack—Hope is a federal electoral district in the Fraser Valley region of British Columbia.

Chilliwack—Hope was created by the 2012 federal electoral boundaries redistribution and was legally defined in the 2013 representation order. It came into effect upon the call of the 42nd Canadian federal election, scheduled for October 2015. It was created out of 76% of the electoral district of Chilliwack—Fraser Canyon.

== Demographics ==
Panethnic groups in Chilliwack—Hope (2011−2021)
Panethnic group	2021		2016		2011	
Panethnic group	Pop.	%	Pop.	%	Pop.	%
European (Note: Statistic includes all persons that did not make up part of a visible minority or an indigenous identity.)	88,205	80.07%	82,320	83.88%	78,395	85.96%
Indigenous	10,155	9.22%	9,255	9.43%	8,355	9.16%
South Asian	3,255	2.95%	1,480	1.51%	955	1.05%
Southeast Asian (Note: Statistic includes total responses of "Filipino" and "Southeast Asian" under visible minority section on census.)	2,585	2.35%	1,365	1.39%	980	1.07%
East Asian (Note: Statistic includes total responses of "Chinese", "Korean", and "Japanese" under visible minority section on census.)	2,550	2.31%	1,835	1.87%	1,420	1.56%
Latin American	1,115	1.01%	555	0.57%	405	0.44%
African	1,060	0.96%	730	0.74%	345	0.38%
Middle Eastern (Note: Statistic includes total responses of "West Asian" and "Arab" under visible minority section on census.)	520	0.47%	220	0.22%	80	0.09%
Other (Note: Statistic includes total responses of "Visible minority, n.i.e." and "Multiple visible minorities" under visible minority section on census.)	715	0.65%	380	0.39%	265	0.29%
Total responses	110,160	98.32%	98,135	98.01%	91,200	98.35%
Total population	112,037	100%	100,126	100%	92,734	100%
Notes: Totals greater than 100% due to multiple origin responses. Demographics based on 2012 Canadian federal electoral redistribution riding boundaries.

According to the 2011 Canadian census; 2013 representation

Ethnic groups: 86.0% White, 9.2% Aboriginal, 1.0% South Asian
Languages: 87.8% English, 3.2% German, 2.0% Dutch, 1.6% French
Religions: 55.5% Christian (13.1% Catholic, 5.8% United Church, 4.0% Anglican, 2.3% Lutheran, 2.2% Pentecostal, 2.0% Baptist, 1.3% Presbyterian, 24.8% Other), 42.0% No religion
Median income (2010): $26,035
Average income (2010): $34,587

== Riding associations ==
Riding associations are the local branches of political parties:

Party	Association name	CEO	HQ city
Conservative	Chilliwack--Hope Conservative Association	Jeremy Giesbrecht	Chilliwack
Green	Chilliwack--Hope Green Party Association	Debora L. Soutar	Chilliwack
Liberal	Chilliwack--Hope Federal Liberal Association	Brian C. Martin	Chilliwack
New Democratic	Chilliwack--Hope Federal NDP Riding Association	Danielle (DJ) J. Pohl	Chilliwack

== Members of Parliament ==
This riding has elected the following members of the House of Commons of Canada:

Parliament	Years	Member	Party
Chilliwack—Hope; Riding created from Chilliwack—Fraser Canyon
42nd	2015–2019	Mark Strahl	Conservative
43rd	2019–2021	Mark Strahl	Conservative
44th	2021–2025	Mark Strahl	Conservative
45th	2025–present	Mark Strahl	Conservative

== Election results ==
View source data.
Graph of election results in Chilliwack—Hope (minor parties that never got 2% of the vote or didn't run consistently are omitted)

=== 2023 representation order ===
2025 Canadian federal election
Party	Candidate	Votes	%	±%	Expenditures
Conservative	Mark Strahl	36,027	54.79	+8.80	$90,994.68
Liberal	Zeeshan Khan	23,254	35.37	+18.25	$34,016.34
New Democratic	Teri Westerby	4,779	7.27	–19.15	$17,752.05
Green	Salina Derish	1,083	1.65	–1.16	none listed
People's	Jeff Galbraith	482	0.73	–6.92	$7,816.44
United	Christopher Adam	129	0.20	–	none listed
Total valid votes/expense limit		65,754	99.54	–	$142,106.97
Total rejected ballots		305	0.46	–0.02	
Turnout		66,059	67.83	+6.75	
Eligible voters		97,390			
Conservative notional hold		Swing		–4.73	
Source: Elections Canada

2021 federal election redistributed results
Party	Vote	%
Conservative	25,421	45.99
New Democratic	14,603	26.42
Liberal	9,463	17.12
People's	4,230	7.65
Green	1,553	2.81

=== 2013 representation order ===
2021 Canadian federal election
Party	Candidate	Votes	%	±%	Expenditures
Conservative	Mark Strahl	23,987	45.99	–3.63	$91,344.54
New Democratic	DJ Pohl	13,927	26.70	+10.04	$41,511.72
Liberal	Kelly Velonis	8,851	16.97	–3.21	$17,745.64
People's	Rob Bogunovic	4,004	7.68	+4.40	none listed
Green	Arthur Green	1,391	2.67	–7.09	$3,746.80
Total valid votes/expense limit		52,160	99.52	–	$114,712.45
Total rejected ballots		250	0.48	+0.06	
Turnout		52,410	61.08	–4.10	
Eligible voters		85,809			
Conservative hold		Swing		–	
Source: Elections Canada

2019 Canadian federal election
Party	Candidate	Votes	%	±%	Expenditures
Conservative	Mark Strahl	26,672	49.62	+7.29	$83,272.16
Liberal	Kelly Velonis	10,848	20.18	–13.60	$33,281.74
New Democratic	Heather McQuillan	8,957	16.66	–1.53	$9,116.65
Green	Arthur Green	5,243	9.75	+5.04	$9,533.31
People's	Rob Bogunovic	1,760	3.27	–	$5,190.90
Christian Heritage	Daniel Lamache	202	0.38	–	$2,024.46
Marxist–Leninist	Dorothy-Jean O'Donnell	73	0.14	–0.03	none listed
Total valid votes/expense limit		53,755	99.58	–	$109,082.36
Total rejected ballots		226	0.42	+0.12	
Turnout		53,981	65.18	–4.55	
Eligible voters		82,824			
Conservative hold		Swing		+10.44	
Source: Elections Canada

2015 Canadian federal election
Party	Candidate	Votes	%	±%	Expenditures
Conservative	Mark Strahl	21,445	42.33	–17.23	$124,817.44
Liberal	Louis De Jaeger	17,114	33.78	+22.60	$60,637.40
New Democratic	Seonaigh MacPherson	9,218	18.20	–5.30	$33,220.27
Green	Thomas Cheney	2,386	4.71	–0.32	$1,715.67
Libertarian	Alexander Johnson	416	0.82	–	none listed
Marxist–Leninist	Dorothy-Jean O'Donnell	82	0.16	–	none listed
Total valid votes/expense limit		50,661	99.70	–	$204,841.51
Total rejected ballots		154	0.30	–	
Turnout		50,815	69.73	–	
Eligible voters		72,874			
Conservative notional hold		Swing		–19.92	
Source: Elections Canada

2011 federal election redistributed results
Party	Vote	%
Conservative	22,748	59.57
New Democratic	8,972	23.49
Liberal	4,272	11.19
Green	1,922	5.03
Others	276	0.72

== See also ==
- List of Canadian electoral districts
- Historical federal electoral districts of Canada
