= Grass Indian Reserve No. 15 =

First Nation reserve in British Columbia, Canada

Coordinates: 49°08′00″N 121°53′00″W

Grass Indian Reserve No. 15 is an Indian reserve in the area of the City of Chilliwack, British Columbia, Canada, located 3.5 miles southeast of that city's downtown area. 64.80 ha. in size, it is shared by nine bands of the Sto:lo people. These are :

- Aitchelitz First Nation
- Kwaw-kwaw-Apilt First Nation
- Shxwhá:y Village
- Skowkale First Nation
- Skwah First Nation
- Soowahlie First Nation
- Squiala First Nation
- Tzeachten First Nation
- Yakweakwioose First Nation

== See also ==
- List of Indian reserves in British Columbia
