= Sto:lo Nation Tribal Council =

Sto:lo Nation Tribal Council may refer to one of two tribal councils of the Sto:lo people:

- Sto:lo Nation
- Stó:lō Tribal Council
