= Skumalasph Indian Reserve No. 16 =

Coordinates: 49.1958°N 122.0282°W

Skumalasph Indian Reserve No. 16 is an Indian reserve of the Sto:lo people in the area of the City of Chilliwack, British Columbia, Canada. Located six miles northwest of downtown Chilliwack and 468.40 ha. in area, it is jointly administered by five band governments, which are:

- Aitchelitz First Nation
- Kwaw-kwaw-Apilt First Nation
- Skway First Nation
- Skwah First Nation
- Squiala First Nation

== See also ==
- List of Indian Reserves in Canada
