= D'Herbomez Creek =

Creek in Mission, British Columbia

Coordinates: 49°08′00″N 122°17′00″W

D'Herbomez Creek is a creek in eastern Mission, British Columbia, flowing southeast to join the Fraser River at the Pekw'Xe:yles Indian Reserve (formerly the grounds of St. Mary's Indian Residential School).

== History ==
The name was adopted in 1952 to commemorate Bishop Louis-Joseph d'Herbomez, OMI ( -1890), who on March 28, 1862 had purchased the land the creek flows through for the location of the Indian mission which is the namesake of the District of Mission. The mission became the St. Mary's Indian Residential School and is now run by a coalition of 21 Indian bands of the Sto:lo people as a cultural and educational facility. The western part of the mission's lands, which are known as the OMI Lands, form the Fraser River Heritage Park, which has the foundations of the original mission and school, while the eastern portion where the newer residential school buildings are located was designated as an Indian reserve in June, 2005, as Pekw'Xe:yles (Peckquaylis).

== See also ==
- List of rivers of British Columbia
