= Ethel Gardner =

Canadian indigenous languages academic

- Born: Hope, British Columbia, Canada
- Citizenship: Skwah First Nation
- Known for: Indigenous language revitalization

Academic background
- Education: BEd, MEd University of British Columbia; EdM., 1993, Harvard University; PhD., 2002, Simon Fraser University
- Thesis: [2002 Tset híkwstexw te sqwélteltset, we hold our language high: the meaning of Halq'eméylem language renewal in the everyday lives of Stó:lo people]

Academic work
- Discipline: Education
- Institutions: Simon Fraser University, Lakehead University, University of Alberta

Ethel Stelomethet Gardner is a Stó꞉lō member of the Skwah First Nation and a researcher in indigenous language revitalization. Gardner's work focuses on technological innovation to support Indigenous Language Revitalization pedagogy She is currently the Elder in Residence at Simon Fraser University and the Nicola Valley Institute of Technology, having previously held faculty positions at Simon Fraser University, Lakehead University and the University of Alberta. Her numerous projects have focused on the use of innovative technologies, which notably combines human knowledge and computer programming. In addition to her Indigenous Languages literacy work, Gardner has focused on computer assisted instruction for initial teacher education using computer-assisted instruction, web-based writing and teaching tools, and audiovisual web communication techniques. She is a pioneer in the training and support of educators teaching remotely.

== Early life and education ==
A member of the Skwah First Nation, Gardner was born in Hope, British Columbia but moved to Quebec shortly after. While in Quebec, she was teased by her classmates for being Indigenous. However, her father was a speaker of Halq'eméylem, which he would speak to them at home. As an adult, Gardner returned to British Columbia where she studied Language Revitalization and Linguistics. She received her Bachelor of Education at the University of British Columbia in 1983 through the Indigenous Teacher Program, later completing her MEd at the University of British Columbia in 1986 through the Ts’‘kel Graduate Program, as well as her EdM at Harvard University in 1993 and her PhD at Simon Fraser University, which she completed in 2002.

== Notable projects ==
Gardner's projects include the E-Master-Apprentice Pedagogy for Critically Endangered Languages and the Language Planning for Anishinaabemowin Revitalization in Grand Council Treaty #3. In 2019, Gardner, along with Elder Siyamiyateliyot, the only Halq'emeylem speaker, presented at the Let Language Live conference in 2019, focusing on creating Halq'emeylem podcasts, poetry and other forms of innovative language sharing

== Publications ==
- Gardner, S. E. B. (2008). Iyómex, éyqwlha, yú: Wqwlha, language as musical space an aesthetic approach to research. Voices: A World Forum for Music Therapy, 8(3). https://doi.org/10.15845/voices.v8i3.412
- Gardner, E. B. (2000). Where there are always wild strawberries. Canadian Journal of Native Education, 24(1), 7–13.
- Gardner, S.E.B. (2004). Tset hikwstexw te sqwelteltset: We hold our language high. Canadian Journal of Native Education, 28(1), 130–148.
- Gardner, E. B. (1988). Ka-im’s gift: A st:lo legend(With commentary by the author). Canadian Journal of Native Education, 15(3), 101–108.
