= Leqʼá꞉mel First Nation =

First Nations band government in BC, Canada

Leqʼá꞉mel First Nation, formerly known as Lakahahmen First Nation, is a First Nations band government whose community and offices are located in the area near Deroche, British Columbia in the Fraser Valley region in Canada, about 12 kilometres east of the District of Mission. They are a member government of the Sto:lo Nation Chiefs Council, which is one of two tribal councils of the Sto:lo (though many bands are independent of either).

Although also known as the Sumas before 1962, the Leqʼá꞉mel people are distinct from present-day Sumas. Other previous names include Alternate Nicomen (1911), Nicomen Slough, Somass River, merged with Squeam or Skweahm (post 1924) and changed To Lackahahmen (1962–2003). They were historically affiliated with the Sumas, Scowlitz, Matsqui and Nooksack tribes.

Its governance structure is described as a custom electoral system. The current chief is Alice Thompson who is serving a term running from April 1, 2021, to March 31, 2025.

The name "Leqʼá꞉mel" means "the level place where people meet" reflecting how it was described as having been one of the most popular trading stops in Stó:lō territory. The place is also thought to be the birthplace of the Halkomelem dialect Halq’eméylem. Historically, people lived in longhouses on Leqʼá꞉mel land up to one kilometre in length.

== Population ==
The band has an approximate population of 460 as reported by the Government of British Columbia. The 2016 census lists 695 members of the First Nation, a decline of 11% from the 2006 census. Of them, 150 were registered Indian. As of July 2022, 125 registered members live on Leq'á:mel land, 19 live on other reserves and 338 do not live on a reserve.

Two cemeteries are run by the band with dozens of unlabeled graves.

The language of the First Nation is Halq’eméylem. However, it is not a mother tongue for many residents of their reserves. Those knowing the language halved from 2006 to 2016 to 2.2%, with 675 members only knowing English.

== Reserves ==
Leq'á:mel First Nation currently holds ten reserve lands exclusively that are located in Abbotsford, Chilliwack, Deroche and Nicomen Island. Three reserves are residential areas, two are cemeteries and the rest are either under a certificate of possession to members, leased for agricultural use, or kept for economic development. Indian Reserves under its administration include:

- Aylechootlook Indian Reserve No. 5, at the confluence of the Sumas River and Vedder Canal, 18.70 ha.49°07′00″N 122°06′00″W
- Holachten Indian Reserve No. 8, on the right (north) bank of Nicomen Slough of the Fraser River, 102.10 ha.49°13′00″N 122°02′00″W
- Lackaway Indian Reserve No. 2, on the left (south) bank of the Fraser River at the mouth of Wilson Slough, 15.80 ha.49°08′00″N 122°03′00″W
- Lakahahmen Indian Reserve No. 11, on the right (north) bank of Nicomen Slough at the confluence of Deroche Creek and the Fraser River, 38.1 ha.49°12′00″N 122°05′00″W It is the most populated of the reserves. A 2016 census shows a slight decline in the number of residents to 177, 31% of which had North American Aboriginal origins. The mother tongue of 170 individuals was English and of zero to five, French and five to ten, Mohawk.
- Lakway Cemetery Indian Reserve No. 3, 9.79 acres on the left (south) bank of the Fraser River, 1/2 mile east of the mouth of Wilson Slough, 4 ha.49°09′00″N 122°03′00″W
- Papekwatchin Indian Reserve No. 4, on the south shore of Nicomen Island on the Fraser River, 95.10 ha.49°09′00″N 122°07′00″W
- Pekw'Xe:yles (Peckquaylis), on the site of the former St. Mary's Indian Residential School, between downtown Mission and Hatzic, 10.30 ha. Shared between 21 bands.49°08′29″N 122°16′20″W
- Skweahm Indian Reserve No. 10, on the left (south) bank of Nicomen Slough, one mile south of Deroche CPR Station, 69.40 ha. 49°11′00″N 122°05′00″W
- Sumas Cemetery Indian Reserve No. 12, 6.93 acres on the left bank of the Fraser River, near the mouth of the Sumas River on the northern east side of Sumas Mountain, 2.50 ha.49°08′00″N 122°06′00″W
- Yaalstrick Indian Reserve No. 1, on Yaalstrick Island in the Fraser River, 2 miles southeast of the Deroche CPR station, 114.90 ha.49°10′00″N 122°03′00″W
- Zaitscullachan Indian Reserve No. 9, on the right bank of Zaits-Cullachan Slough of the Fraser River, 22.50 ha.49°11′00″N 122°02′00″W

Three of these reserves are residential, two are cemeteries, and the others are variously under Certificates of Possession by band members, leased out for agriculture, or set aside for economic development.

In 2021, 60 ha of government land adjacent to Fraser River Heritage Park and the Pekw’xe:yles Indian Reserve, the former site of St. Mary's Indian Residential School, was transferred to the Leq’á:mel, Matsqui (Mathexwi) and Sumas (Semá:th) First Nations Society. Not being reserve land, the property remains under provincial and local government laws. Most of it was leased back to the government for use as a park and recreational area. The property also contains pre-contact archaeological sites.
