= Shxwʼōwhámél First Nation =

The Shxwʼōwhámél First Nation or Shxwʼōwhámél Band is a band government of the Stó꞉lō people located in the Upper Fraser Valley region near Hope, British Columbia, Canada. They are a member government of the Stó:lō Tribal Council.
