= Stsʼailes Nation =

First Nation band in British Columbia

Stsʼailes Nation (Halkomelem: Stsʼaʼí꞉les), formerly known as Chehalis First Nation (/ʃəˈheɪlɪs/ shə-HAY-liss), is the band government of the Stsʼailes people, whose territories lie between Deroche and Agassiz, British Columbia. The Sts'Alies are a Halkomelem-speaking people but are distinct historically and politically from the surrounding Sto:lo peoples.

== Demographics ==
Number of Band Members: 1185

== Reserves ==
Reserves under the jurisdiction of Sts'ailes Nation include:

- Chehalis Indian Reserve No. 5, on the right bank (west bank) of the Harrison River (location of the main community), 880.20 ha
- Chehalis Indian Reserve No. 6, on the left bank (east bank) of the Harrison River, opposite IR No. 5, 25.5 ha.
- Pekw'Xe:yles (Peckquaylis) 10.3 ha. Shared with 23 other bands, former site of St. Mary's Indian Residential School in Mission, now an educational and business complex

== Economic development ==
In 1974, the Sts'ailes Band had one staff member; now they have over 200 employees working for the Band and Development Corporation.

In 2009, the tribe purchased the historic Fenn Lodge, turning it into Sasquatch Crossing Eco Lodge. The lodge offers outdoor recreation opportunities and tribal cultural experiences for tourists.
