= Semath Industries =

Se:math Industries
- Industry: Brick Factory
- Headquarters: Sumas First Nation
- Key people: Ray Silver; Rahul Lakhote
- Owner: Sumas First Nation

Se:math Industries was an artisanal brick foundry that took over the operations of the historic Clayburn Brick Foundry that first opened in 1905

== History ==
Charles Maclure opened the first brick foundry in 1905, the first in British Columbia. The clay deposits were of high value and the bricks made from its clay were known for their tolerance of extremely high temperatures. The community of Clayburn, Abbotsford sprang up around the foundry and the settlement was known locally for its early twentieth-century brickworks and brick worker's cottages which line its main street. Demand eventually fell off as cheaper products from around the world came online. The brick plant, after operating for a quarter-century, was dismantled in 1931 and operations moved closer to Sumas mountain.

== Se:math ownership ==
Since the opening of the plant the Se:math people of the Sumas First Nation have made up many of its workers. When operations began to falter due to globalization in the 70s the Sumas First Nation not only took control of the land but the plant itself in 1981. Renamed Sumas Clay Products, for more than two decades the Sumas First Nation ran the plant. In 2009 the plant was facing bankruptcy so Rahul Lakhote, Ray Boyes, and artist Ray Silver got funding to remake the plant into an artisanal brick foundry, Se:math Industries. The plant, which houses the only operational bee-hive kilns in the country, was in turn taken over by Gunina Partners Inc. and Xey: teleq Enterprises. This continued until Xey:teleq Enterprises was dissolved on July 9, 2012 and Gunina Partners Inc was dissolved on August 29, 2017.

== Bibliography ==
Notes

References

- Abbotsford City Council (July 12, 2012). "Dissolutions". Abbotsford Registrar of Companies. CLII (28).
- Abbotsford City Council (August 31, 2017). "Dissolutions - 0785158". Abbotsford Registrar of Companies. CLVII (35).
- Clayburn Village Community Society (2020). "Welcome to Clayburn Village". clayburnvillage.com.
- Historical Metallurgy Society (1985). Historical Metallurgy. Vol. 19–21. Historical Metallurgy Society.
- Lakhote, Rahul (January 24, 2010). "Preserving Culture Brick by Brick" (PDF). Journal of the Architectural Institute of British Columbia (34). OCLC 41766557.
- Sorensen, Jean (December 24, 2009). "Sumas First Nation establishes niche market for brick". ConstructConnect Canada, Inc.
