= Aitchelitz First Nation =

First Nations band government of the Sto:lo people

Aitchelitz
- Band No. 558
- People: Stó꞉lō
- Headquarters: Chilliwack
- Province: British Columbia

Land
- Other reserves: Pekw'xe:yles; Aitchelitch 9; Grass 15; Skumalasph 16
- Land area: 5.6 km^{2} (2.2 sq mi)

Population (2024)
- On reserve: 16
- On other land: 7
- Off reserve: 18
- Total population: 41

Government
- Chief: Angie Bailey
- Council size: 2
- Council: Leona Sam

Tribal Council
- Stó꞉lō Tribal Council

Aitchelitz First Nation (Halkomelem: Áthelets), also known as the Aitchelitz Band, is a First Nations band government of the Sto:lo people, located at Sardis, British Columbia, Canada (Chilliwack). It is a member of the Sto:lo Nation tribal council.

== Reserves ==
The band has three Indian Reserves:

- Aitchelitch 9, 21.4 ha., 2.25 miles southwest of downtown Chilliwack
- Grass 15, 64.8 ha, 3.5 miles southeast of downtown Chilliwack
- Skumalasph 16, 468.4 ha., 6 miles northwest of downtown Chilliwack

It also shares Pekw'Xe:yles (Peckquaylis) Reserve, the former St. Mary's Indian Residential School and associated lands in Mission, with 20 other Sto:lo band governments.

== Treaty process ==
Aitchelitz First Nation is part of seven of the 11 Sto:lo Nation First Nations have decided to continue in the BC Treaty Process. They have reached Stage 4.

== Population ==
The band has a registered population of 40, 25 of whom live on one of the band's reserves.
