= Skwá First Nation =

Chilliwack band government

The Skwá or Skwah First Nation or Band (Halkomelem: Sqwehá or Sqwá) is a band government of the Sto:lo people in the area of the City of Chilliwack, British Columbia, Canada. It should not be confused with the Skway First Nation in the same area, which is a member of the Sto:lo Nation Chiefs Council, while the Skwah Nation is not.

== Reserves ==
Reserves under the administration of Skwah First Nation are:

- Grass Indian Reserve No. 15, 1/2 miles southeast of Chilliwack, 64.80 ha. shared with eight other bands
- Pekw'Xe:yles (Peckquaylis), site of the former St. Mary's Indian Residential School, now a cultural/government/business centre, 10.30 ha.
- Schelowat Indian Reserve No. 1, on the right bank of Hope Slough, 5 miles east of Chilliwack, 85.20 ha.
- Skumalasph Indian Reserve No. 16, 6 miles northwest of Chilliwack, 468.40 ha., shared with four other bands
- Skwah Indian Reserve No. 4, west of and adjoining downtown Chilliwack, 126.30 ha.
- Skwahla Indian Reserve No. 2, on the left bank of Hope Slough, 1 mile northeast of Chilliwack, 11.70 ha,
- Skwali Indian Reserve No. 3, northwest of and at the City of Chiillwack, 118.50 ha.

== Population ==
The registered population of Skwah First Nation is 479. Of these 232 live on one of the band's own reserves (115 male, 117 female), 51 live on reserves administered by another band (25 male, 26 female), while 196 live off-reserve (91 male, 105 female).
