= Sumas First Nation =

Sto:lo First Nation located in Abbotsford, British Columbia

- Band No. 578
- Semá:th
- People: Sto:lo
- Headquarters: Abbotsford
- Province: British Columbia

Land
- Main reserve: Upper Sumas 6
- Reserve: Pekw'Xe:yles
- Land area: 2.453 km^{2} (0.947 sq mi)

Population (2025)
- On reserve: 154
- On other land: 35
- Off reserve: 194
- Total population: 383

Government
- Chief: Dalton Silver

Website
- sumasfirstnation.com

Sumas First Nation (Halkomelem: Sema:th) Sumalh or Sumas Indian Band is a band government of the Sto:lo people located in the Upper Fraser Valley region, at the community of Kilgard a.k.a. Upper Sumas, part of Abbotsford, British Columbia, Canada. They are a member government of the Sto:lo Nation tribal council.

Its governance structure is a custom electoral system. The current chief is Dalton Silver. The official language is Halq'eméylem.

The group occupies the region near the Sumas Prairie, and historically used Sumas Lake as "our supermarket, our shopping centre," before it was drained by colonial authorities who wanted to farm the land underneath. When the lake was drained, the First Nation was pushed onto a nearby reserve so that settlers could use the fertile soil underneath the lake. The First Nation occupies higher ground near the Prairie, not the prairie on the lake-bed itself, so they did not have to evacuate when the former lake flooded during the November 2021 Pacific Northwest floods.

Before 1962, the people were known as Sumas (Kilgard) and are distinct from the Leqʼá꞉mel who were also known as the Sumas before 1962. Other previous names include: Nicomen Slough, Somass River and Sumas Tribe. The name "Sumas" means "big flat opening" or "land without trees" and is derived from a Cowichan tribe.

Their reserve land area covers 245.3 ha (606 acres) and has a population of 383. In 2021, 60 hectares of government land adjacent to Fraser River Heritage Park and the Pekw’xe:yles Indian Reserve, the former site of St. Mary's Indian Residential School, was transferred to the Leq’á:mel, Matsqui (Mathexwi) and Sumas First Nations Society. Not being reserve land, the property remains under provincial and local government laws. Most of it was leased back to the government for use as a park and recreational area. The property also contains pre-contact archaeological sites.

The First Nation band council runs a number of businesses including Semath Industries.

== See also ==
- Sumas River
- Sumas Lake
- Sumas Prairie
- Sumas, Washington
- Sumas (disambiguation)
