= Sardis, Chilliwack =

Sardis
- Neighbourhood in Chilliwack
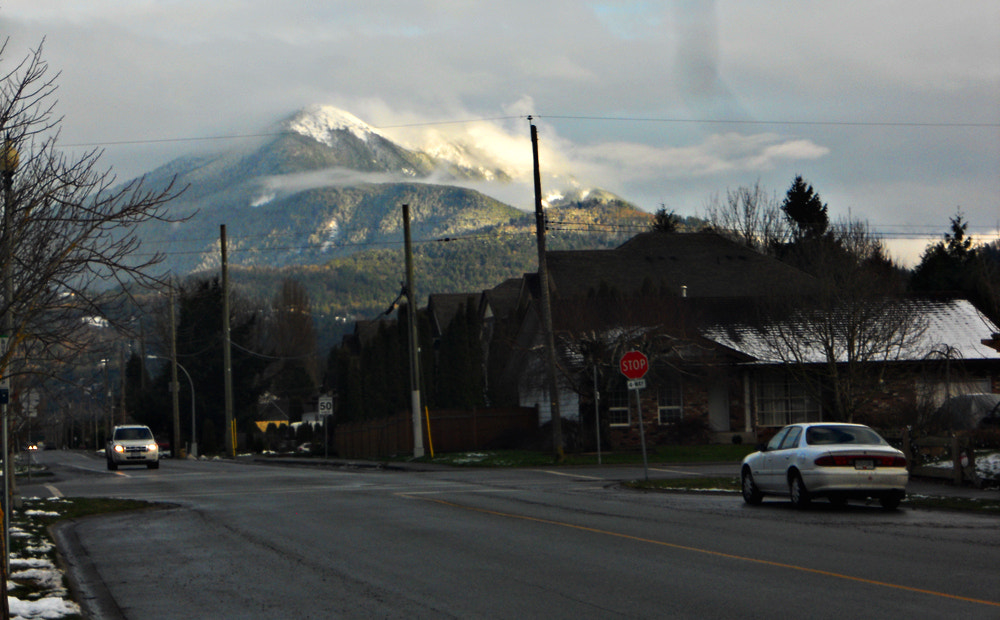

- Location of Sardis in British Columbia
- Coordinates: 49°08′00″N 121°57′00″W
- City: Chilliwack
- Province: British Columbia
- Country: Canada
- Settled: c. 1860
- Time zone: UTC-8 (PST)
  - Summer (DST): UTC-7 (PDT)
- Postal code: V2R
- Area code: +1-604

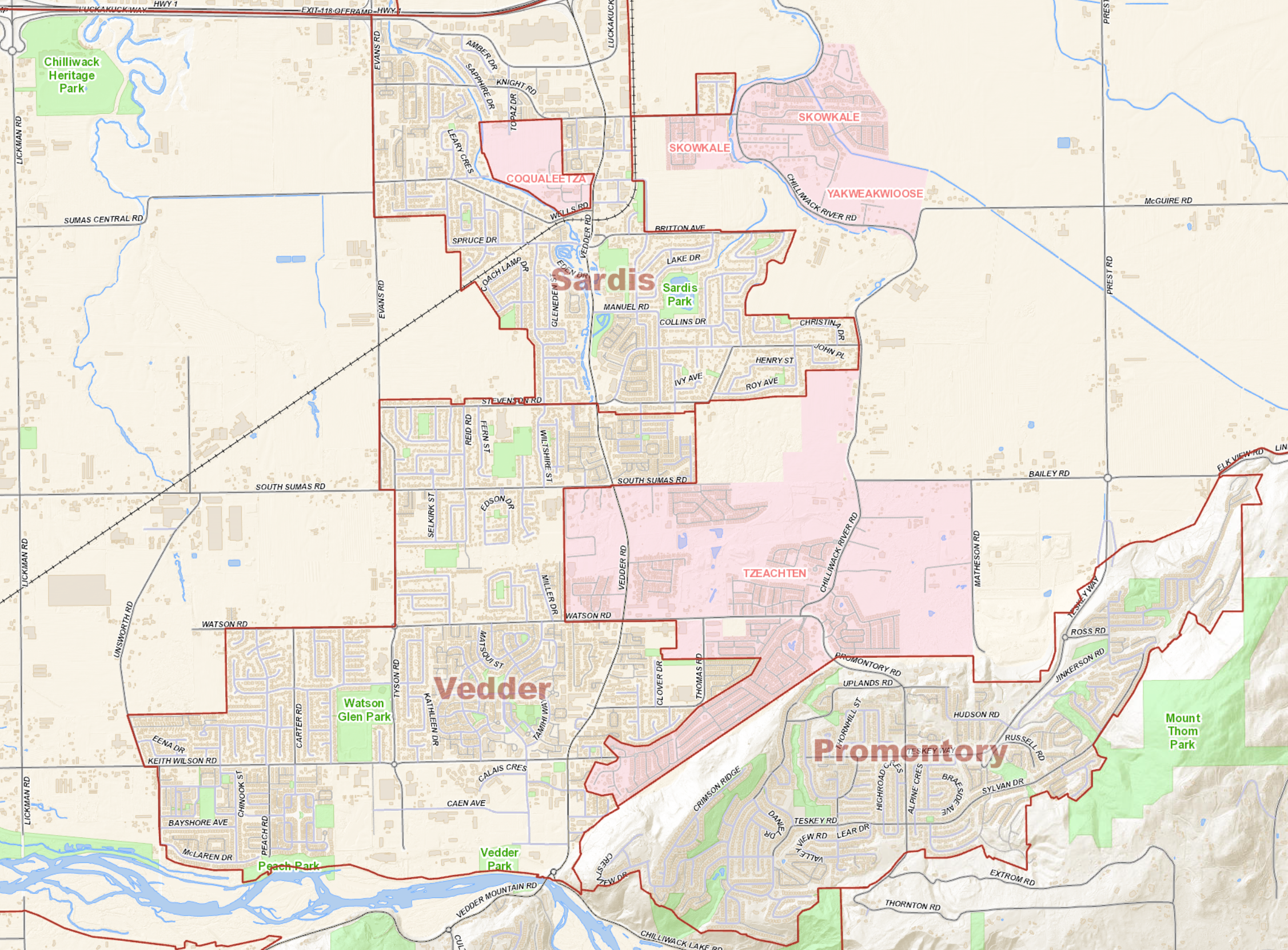
Sardis & Vedder Neighbourhood Map

Sardis is a small community on the south side of Chilliwack, about 5 kilometres (3.1 mi) from downtown, in the Fraser River Valley. Sardis is the urban core of the south side of Chilliwack and a popular shopping destination. The official neighbourhood borders Highway 1 to the north, Evans Road on the west, the BC Railway line on the east, and Stevenson Road on the south.

== History ==
A.C. Wells, Adam Vedder and Jane Evans were the first known farmers to settle in Sardis around 1860. The name "Sardis" was chosen by Mrs. Vedder after the historical capital of Lydia in present-day Turkey. The British Columbia Electric Railway reached Sardis in 1910.

== Parks and recreation ==
Sardis Park
A 5 ha (12-acre) park that is also a sanctuary for a number of wild fowl species, including the mute swans that live in the park year-round, and the migratory trumpeter swans in summer.

Watson Glen Park
A 11.12 ha (27.5-acre) park located in the Vedder Crossing neighbourhood that includes tennis courts, a ball hockey box, a skate park, and three indoor hockey rinks.

Cheam Leisure Centre
A leisure centre located in the Vedder Crossing neighbourhood that includes squash courts, a weight room, fitness equipment, a double gymnasium, a 25-metre swimming pool, a leisure pool, an artificial river, a hot tub and a sauna.

Webster Landing skate park
Track for skateboards and BMX bicycles located in the Vedder Crossing neighbourhood.

Sardis Library
A multi-purpose library and community centre in the Watson Glen area of the Vedder Crossing neighbourhood.

== Shopping and entertainment ==
Luckakuck Way is a popular destination for shopping, restaurants and cinema. It includes two major shopping malls, and numerous retail outlets and apartment complexes.

== Climate ==
Climate data for Sardis
Month	Jan	Feb	Mar	Apr	May	Jun	Jul	Aug	Sep	Oct	Nov	Dec	Year
Record high °C (°F)	18.0 (64.4)	19.0 (66.2)	24.0 (75.2)	30.5 (86.9)	34.5 (94.1)	33.0 (91.4)	37.0 (98.6)	34.5 (94.1)	36.5 (97.7)	28.0 (82.4)	18.5 (65.3)	15.5 (59.9)	37.0 (98.6)
Mean daily maximum °C (°F)	6.0 (42.8)	8.4 (47.1)	11.1 (52.0)	14.5 (58.1)	17.8 (64.0)	20.5 (68.9)	23.8 (74.8)	24.3 (75.7)	21.0 (69.8)	14.6 (58.3)	8.5 (47.3)	4.8 (40.6)	14.6 (58.3)
Daily mean °C (°F)	2.9 (37.2)	4.4 (39.9)	6.8 (44.2)	9.7 (49.5)	12.7 (54.9)	15.5 (59.9)	17.9 (64.2)	18.2 (64.8)	15.2 (59.4)	10.3 (50.5)	5.4 (41.7)	2.2 (36.0)	10.1 (50.2)
Mean daily minimum °C (°F)	−0.2 (31.6)	0.3 (32.5)	2.4 (36.3)	4.8 (40.6)	7.6 (45.7)	10.3 (50.5)	12.0 (53.6)	12.1 (53.8)	9.3 (48.7)	5.9 (42.6)	2.2 (36.0)	−0.5 (31.1)	5.5 (41.9)
Record low °C (°F)	−15.5 (4.1)	−17.5 (0.5)	−9.0 (15.8)	−2.0 (28.4)	−1.0 (30.2)	3.0 (37.4)	5.0 (41.0)	6.0 (42.8)	2.0 (35.6)	−7.0 (19.4)	−18.5 (−1.3)	−16.5 (2.3)	−18.5 (−1.3)
Average precipitation mm (inches)	208.8 (8.22)	128.7 (5.07)	137.5 (5.41)	116.5 (4.59)	92.7 (3.65)	58.0 (2.28)	54.5 (2.15)	70.9 (2.79)	154.0 (6.06)	154.0 (6.06)	240.9 (9.48)	183.3 (7.22)	1,538.5 (60.57)
Average rainfall mm (inches)	186.3 (7.33)	113.6 (4.47)	129.3 (5.09)	115.7 (4.56)	92.7 (3.65)	92.7 (3.65)	58.0 (2.28)	54.5 (2.15)	70.9 (2.79)	153.8 (6.06)	229.7 (9.04)	163.5 (6.44)	1,460.7 (57.51)
Average snowfall cm (inches)	22.5 (8.9)	15.1 (5.9)	8.2 (3.2)	0.8 (0.3)	0.0 (0.0)	0.0 (0.0)	0.0 (0.0)	0.0 (0.0)	0.0 (0.0)	0.2 (0.1)	11.3 (4.4)	19.8 (7.8)	77.8 (30.6)
Average precipitation days (≥ 0.2 mm)	20.7	16.9	19.9	18.4	17.5	15.4	10.4	9.2	11.4	18.4	22.2	20.1	200.3
Average rainy days (≥ 0.2 mm)	18.2	15.6	19.2	18.4	17.5	15.4	10.4	9.2	11.4	18.3	21.5	18.0	193.1
Average snowy days (≥ 0.2 cm)	3.6	2.4	1.4	0.12	0.0	0.0	0.0	0.0	0.0	0.08	1.5	3.8	12.9
Source: Environment Canada (normals, 1981–2010)

== See also ==
- Neighbourhoods in Chilliwack
- Canada Education Park
