= Skway First Nation =

Band government of the Stó꞉lō people

Skway First Nation, (officially Shxwhá꞉y Village), is a band government of the Stó꞉lō people living in the Fraser Valley of British Columbia, Canada near the city of Chilliwack. The Skway traditionally speak the Upriver dialect of Halkomelem, one of the Salishan family of languages. The band is a member government of the Sto:lo Nation tribal council, and should not be confused with the Skwah First Nation, which is in the same area but is a different band.

== Indian Reserves ==
The band administers three Indian Reserves:

- Grass Indian Reserve No. 15, 1/2 mile southeast of Chilliwack, 64.8 ha.
- Skumalasph Indian Reserve No. 16, 6 miles northwest of Chilliwack, 468.4 ha.
- Skway Indian Reserve No. 5, 2 miles west of Chilliwack, 255 ha. (location of Skway Village)

The band also shares with 20 other bands the Peckquaylis Indian Reserve, formerly St. Mary's Indian Residential School at Mission, which is now a cultural, government and aboriginal business centre.

== Treaty process ==
The Skway are at Stage 4 in British Columbia Treaty Process with the rest of the Sto:lo Nation tribal council.
