= Sqʼewá꞉lxw First Nation =

First Nation band in British Colombia

The Sqʼewá꞉lxw First Nation, anglicized as Skawahlook and formerly the Tait Indian Band is a band government of the Sto:lo people whose reserves and communities are located in the Upper Fraser Valley region of British Columbia, Canada, near the community of Ruby Creek, which is at the eastern end of the District of Kent. It is a member government of the Stó꞉lō Nation tribal council, one of two tribal councils of the Sto:lo. Total registered population of the band is 75 people, 59 of them living off-reserve.

== Reserves ==
Reserves under the jurisdiction of the Skawahlook First Nation are:

- Pekw'Xe:yles (Peckquaylis) 10.30 ha. (in Mission, shared with 20 other bands)
- Ruby Creek Indian Reserve No. 2, 16.60 ha.
- Skawahlook Indian Reserve No. 1, 58.30 ha.
