= Stó꞉lō Tribal Council =

The Stó꞉lō Tribal Council is a First Nations tribal council in the Fraser Valley-Greater Vancouver region of the Canadian province of British Columbia. It includes Stó꞉lō First Nations band governments located geographically from Hope, at the south end of the Fraser Canyon, down to Langley.

The Sto꞉lo Nation Chiefs Council has different band members. Several Sto꞉lo peoples and their band governments do not belong to either council.

== Member governments ==
- Chawathil First Nation
- Cheam First Nation
- Kwaw-kwaw-Apilt First Nation
- Sq'éwlets First Nation
- Seabird Island First Nation
- Shxw'ow'hamel First Nation
- Soowahlie First Nation

Source: Indian and Northern Affairs Canada information page

== See also ==
- Sto꞉lo Nation Chiefs Council
- Stó꞉lō
- Halkomelem
- List of tribal councils in British Columbia
