= St. Mary's Indian Residential School =

School in Canada

St. Mary's Indian Residential School was the name of two Indian residential schools in Mission, British Columbia. The first was operated by the Roman Catholic Church of Canada, and the second was operated by the Canadian federal government. Approximately 2,000 children attended the schools while they were in operation, most of them Stó:lō.

== History ==
St. Mary's Mission and Residential School was founded in 1861 by Father Leon Fouquet and initially was opened by the Missionary Oblates of Mary Immaculate in 1863 as a small boarding school for boys and housed 42 indigenous students its first year. It was named after Saint Mary of Egypt. A separate school for girls was opened on the same site in 1868 and operated by the Sisters of Saint Anne. It operated near the Fraser River for nearly two decades, then moved further uphill in 1882 to make room for the construction of the Canadian Pacific Railway. A new school was built in 1933. Mission City was named after this institution.

Boys and girls had separate dormitories. The girls' residence also housed the nuns' quarters, an infirmary, a recreation room and a chapel. The boys' residence housed the boys on the third floor, the Oblate priests on the second floor, and had a chapel, play hall and classroom on the first floor.

The complex also featured a bakery, a tennis court used by the priests and nuns, an automotive shop for vehicle repairs and vocational training for the boys, a farm that included equipment, root cellar, resources, silo, slaughterhouse, pig and bull pens, dairy and milking barn where prize-winning Holsteins were raised by the priests and the boys, a laundry house run by the nuns and students and an older boxing gym and a newer gymnasium built in the late 1940s or early 1950s.

A grotto dedicated to Our Lady of Lourdes, first built in 1892, became the site of yearly pilgrimages, religious ceremonies, and passion plays. The neighboring cemetery served as the burial site for all priests, nuns and students of the Mission with the first priest buried there in 1870. In its early days, the school emphasized academics and Catholic catechism, but its focus shifted to agricultural and industrial skills. Parents were allowed to visit and some families camped around the school as part of a pilgrimage. Students were also allowed to visit the town of Mission until 1948.

According to the Indian Residential School Survivors Society, many former students have "fond memories" of their time at the school. However, other students were abused and at least 22 either died or went missing at the school.

The last graduating class was in 1958. In 1961, students were moved to a new government-run residential school of the same name on the eastern border of the Mission property, and the Roman Catholic school was closed. All the buildings of the former school were demolished in 1965 as they had deteriorated badly with age.

When the government-run school was closed in 1984, it was the last functioning residential school in British Columbia.

== Abuse at the school ==
Corporal punishment was rarely used in the early years of the school. However, that policy ended as the school was integrated into the federal residential school system. Many students reported experiencing physical and sexual abuse at the school, with the Indian Residential School Survivors Society characterising the abuse in the 1960s as "nightmarish."

In 2004, Gerald Moran, a former employee, was convicted of 12 counts of indecent assault that he committed during his time at the school. He was sentenced to three years in prison.

In 2012 thanks to a $200,000 grant from the Truth and Reconciliation Commission to the Abbotsford Sumas band, Leq’a:mel band in Mission, St. Joseph's Catholic Church, and North Fraser Community Church, a monument was carved by Sumas artists from a 450-year-old red cedar and installed in Fraser River Heritage Park to celebrate the reconciliation between victims of abuse at the school and the Catholic Church.

== Current use ==
The grounds of the Catholic mission school became a part of Fraser River Heritage Park in 1986 thanks to efforts by the Mission Heritage Association. A new bell tower was constructed in 2000 and houses the original 1875 bell from the mission. In 2001, the Mission Indian Friendship Centre provided funds to build a covered picnic shelter in the park.

After 1985, land and buildings of the government-run school were initially leased to the Coqualeetza Training Centre, and in 2005, were returned to the Stó:lō as reserve lands. The land formally regained its Stó:lô name of Pekw'Xe:yles and is used by 21 different First Nations governments. There is a newer St. Mary's school just outside of Heritage Park. A native-owned company, Monague Crafts Ltd., leases the newer building. Fraser Valley Aboriginal Child and Family Services (Xyolhemeylh) also operates out of the building as well as various community initiatives like a daycare, and self-defense classes.

Fraser River Heritage Park remains home to the school cemetery. In 2021, the Stó:lō Nation announced a three-year study of the likelihood of unmarked graves at Fraser Valley residential schools, including around the cemetery in Mission. A historic 1958 funeral photo shows at least twelve graves outside the cemetery fence line, an area now covered by blackberry bushes with the iron cross grave markers lying along the cemetery perimeter. In addition to searches of the known graveyard, they plan to search for any unrecorded graves as informal burials is not uncommon among Stó:lō communities. Although no progress had been made, a memorial house post carving was erected at the Pekw'Xe:yles Indian Reserve to honor victims of abuse and those that passed away.
