= Popkum First Nation =

First Nation in British Columbia, Canada

Popkum First Nation or Popkum Band (Halkomelem: Pópkwʼem) is a band government of the Sto:lo people located in the Upper Fraser Valley region, at Popkum, northeast of Chilliwack, British Columbia, Canada. They are a member government of the Stó꞉lō Nation tribal council.
