= Yakweakwioose First Nation =

Band government of Sto:lo people of Canada

Yakweakwioose
- Band No. 576
- People: Stó꞉lō
- Headquarters: Chilliwack
- Province: British Columbia

Land
- Main reserve: Yakweakwioose 12
- Reserves: Pekw'xe:yles; Grass 15
- Land area: 0.958 km^{2} (0.370 sq mi)

Population (2024)
- On reserve: 39
- On other land: 2
- Off reserve: 47
- Total population: 88

Government
- Chief: Terry Horne
- Council: Jazmine Horne; Nicole Larock; Elaine Malloway; Jason Malloway

Tribal Council
- Stó꞉lō Nation Chiefs Council

Yakweakwioose First Nation or Yakweakwioose Band (Halkomelem: Yeqwyeqwí꞉ws) is a band government of the Sto:lo people located in the Upper Fraser Valley region at Sardis, near Chilliwack, British Columbia, Canada. They are a member government of the Sto:lo Nation tribal council.

The traditional languages of the people are Halq'eméylem, hən̓q̓əmin̓əm̓, and Hul’q’umi’num.’ Yeqwyeqwí:ws is the proper Halq’eméylem spelling of Yakweakwioose. As of December 2024, the Nation had a total of 88 registered members, including 39 residing on their own reserve.
