= Sqʼéwqel First Nation =

Band government of the Sto:lo people

The Sqʼéwqel or Seabird Island First Nation or Seabird Island Band is a band government of the Sto:lo people located on Sea Bird Island in the Upper Fraser Valley region, 3 km east of Agassiz, British Columbia, Canada. They are a member government of the Stó:lō Tribal Council.

Seabird Island Band is a multi-faceted First Nations band that includes government, business, service and non-profit services.

== History ==
The story of Seabird Indian Band began over 130 years ago in June 1879 with Gilbert Malcolm Sproat (19 April 1834 – 4 June 1913), a representative of the Indian Reserve Commission, would consult with First Nations people and later allocate the island known then as Skow-a-kull (correct spelling Sq'éwqel) as a reserve to be held in-common by the people from Popkum, Skw'átits, Ohamil, Ska-wah-look, Hope, Union Bar and Yale because the land they currently resided on could not sustain crops, and the land on Seabird Island would provide rich soil and provide a place for First Nations families to live their lives on.

Seabird Island speaks a mix of Halq'eméylem and Thompson language. The Halq'eméylem name for the Seabird Island Band, Sq'éwqel, is translated to "Turn in the River", the English name Seabird Island would be taken from the June 1858 groundings of a transport paddle-wheeler, the SS Sea Bird, on an island bar in the Fraser River across from Seabird Island.

== Services ==
Seabird Indian Band, through Health Transfer Agreements with various First Nations Bands, provides a number of services including:

- Lalme' Iwesawtexw (House of Learning) Elementary and Secondary School (Also known as: Seabird Island Community School)
- Lalme' Iwesawtexw (House of Learning) Adult Education (Also known as: Seabird Island Community School)
- Seabird College (PCTIA registered, #3550)
- Employment Centre
- Doctor's Office
- Dental Clinic
- Fitness Centre
- Mental Health & Wellness Centre
- Housing, Construction and Capital Projects
- Mobile Diabetes Project
- Youth Home
- Family Home
- Recovery Home
- Aboriginal Infant Development
- Bus for Education and Aboriginal Resources
- Daycare
- Maternal and Child Health
- Halq'emeylem Immersion Preschool
- Speech and Language
- Head Start
- Supported Child Development
- Seabird Wi-fi
- Graphic Communications and Promotions
- Fire Department
- EcoStation Composting Facility

== Government ==
Seabird Island Band is governed by one Chief and a nine-person Council, recently reduced to an eight-person council (2017 Election) that share the responsibility of representing Seabird Island Band at all government levels as well as to other groups, ensuring a strong united voice for the Seabird Island Band locally, provincially and nationally, with specific emphasis and involvement with Stó:lō Tribal Council, First Nation Summit and the Assembly of First Nations. The current Chief is Margaret (Maggie) Pettis.

=== Elections ===
Any member of the band who is 18 years of age and is a registered Band Member of the Seabird Island Band is entitled to vote. The Chief can be elected by a majority of votes of the electors. The Chief and Councilors each serve a term of two years. The next scheduled election will be in 2017.

== Seabird Island First Nations Festival ==
The Seabird Island First Nations Festival was first established in May 1969 by Grand Chief Archie Charles and his wife Mary Charles. Today, the Seabird Island First Nations Festival is a celebration of First Nations diversity, culture, growth and First Nations sport talent. Each year the Seabird Island First Nations Festival hosts 9,000 visitors, entertainers, players, War Canoe-pullers, volunteers and sponsors. The tournaments include: Ball Hockey, Soccer, War Canoe racing and Slahal.

The Seabird Island First Nations Festival occurs the last full weekend in May each year.

== Technology ==
In 2007, Seabird Island Band, in partnership with Siemens and BelAir Networks launched a wireless mesh network throughout the Seabird Island Band community. Seabird Island Band would become the first First Nations community in Canada to achieve this feat. The wireless mesh network would be used to offer Seabird Island Band with ubiquitous, high-speed broadband wireless access supporting residential, educational and business communication requirements. Prior to 2007, most Seabird Island Band community members could only access dial-up internet – only the community core had access to high-speed internet.

== Sustainable housing ==
In 2004, Seabird Island Band began a sustainable community housing that uses renewable technologies, and includes first-in-the-world features. Sustainable Housing project provided band members with improved quality, energy efficient housing by integrating renewable energy sources, and it is affordable. Plus, it has other remarkable features, such as reduced maintenance and lower heating and electricity cost, because of the advanced technology.

This unique development is part of the Seabird Island Band's "Sustainable Community Plan". The idea behind sustainable community planning is to use land and design neighbourhoods in a way that reduces costs and minimizes environmental impacts, while creating a livable community - both now and well into the future.
