= Sqʼéwlets First Nation =

Band government in British Columbia, Canada

Sqʼéwlets First Nation, anglicized as Scowlitz, is the band government of Skaulits subgroup of the Stó꞉lō people located on Harrison Bay in the Upper Fraser Valley region between Chehalis (E) and Lake Errock, British Columbia, Canada (W). They are a member government of the Stó꞉lō Tribal Council. The first nation was formerly known as Scowlitz First Nation.

== Reserves ==
The reserves under the administration of Sq'éwlets First Nation are:

- Williams Indian Reserve No. 2, at the outlet of Harrison Bay, adjacent to Harrison Mills, 9.7 ha. 49°14′00″N 121°57′00″W
- Scowlitz Indian Reserve No. 1, at the outlet of Harrison Bay, adjacent to Harrison Mills, 69.0 ha. 49°14′00″N 121°56′00″W
- Squawkum Creek Indian Reserve No. 3, at the southwest corner of Harrison Bay, 158.0 ha. 49°15′00″N 122°00′00″W

== Qithyll/Harrison Knob archaeological site ==
The Sq'éwlets First Nation are partners in an archaeological dig covering Harrison Hill and its subpeak Harrison Knob, known to them as Qithyll, which is an ancient graveyard containing unusual burial mounds known as the Scowlitz Mounds or Fraser Valley Pyramids. The site contains 198 pyramids in 15 distinct clusters.
