= Soowahlie First Nation =

First Nation band in British Colombia, Canada

Soowahlie First Nation, or Soowahlie Band (Halkomelem: Thʼewá꞉lí), is a band government of the Stó꞉lō people located in the Upper Fraser Valley region at Cultus Lake, British Columbia, Canada. They are a member government of the Stó꞉lō Tribal Council. The Reserve land area currently comprises 533.4 hectares and has a population of 373.

== Reserves ==
The reserves under the administration of Soowahlie First Nation are:

- Grass Indian Reserve No. 15, 1/2 mile southeast of Chilliwack, 64.80 ha (shared with eight other bands
- Pekw'Xe:yles (Peckquaylis) - 10.30 ha. (shared with 20 other bands)
- Soowahlie Indian Reserve No. 14, on the left bank of the Chilliwack River, one mile south of Vedder Crossing, 458.30 ha.
