= Chowéthel First Nation =

Band government in the Upper Fraser Valley, British Columbia, Canada

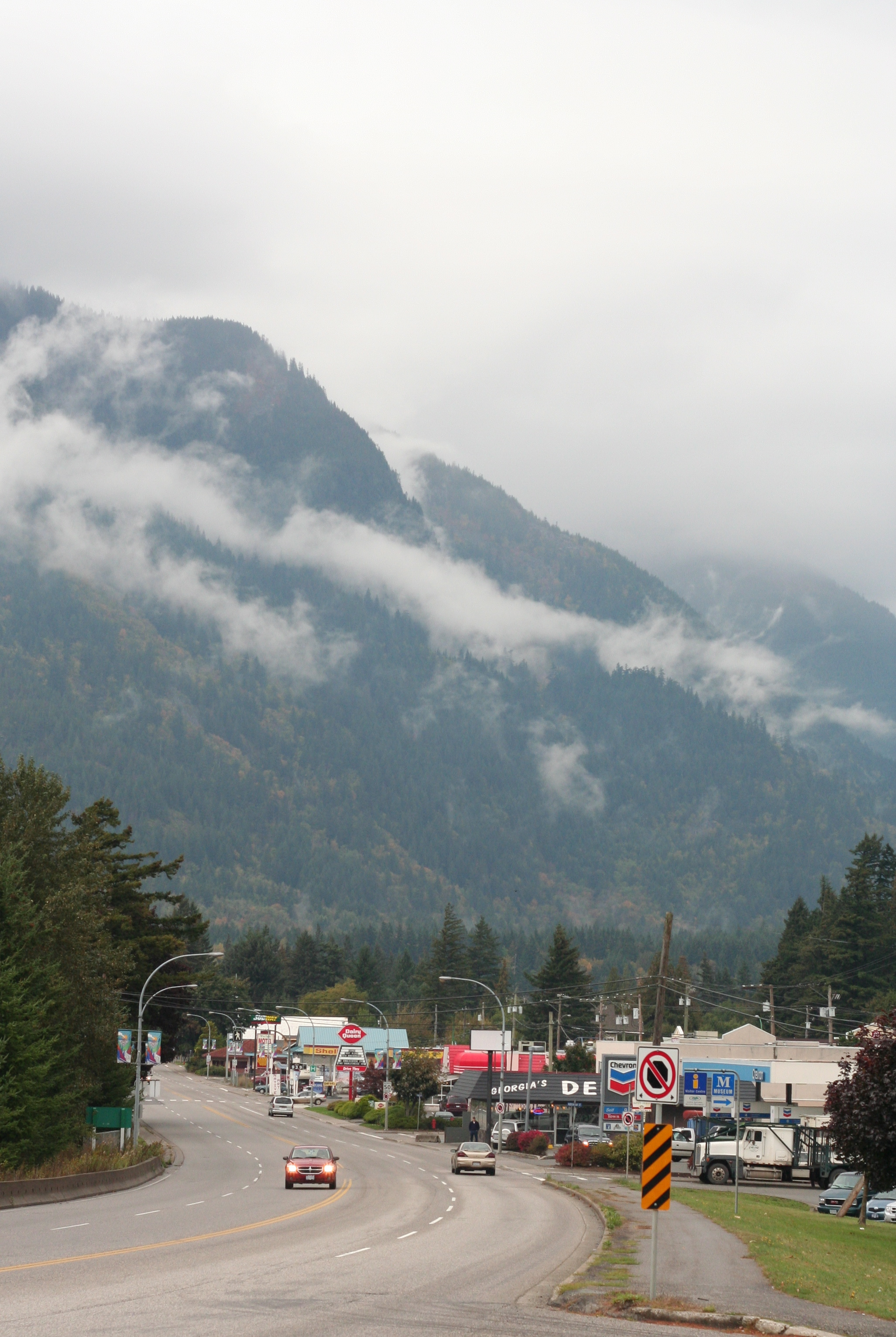
Hope, BC, near Chawathil First Nation

Chowéthel First Nation or Chowéthel Indian Band, also spelled Chawathil, is a band government of the Stó꞉lō people located in the Upper Fraser Valley region near Hope, British Columbia, Canada. They are a member government of the Stó:lō Tribal Council. They are the operators of the Telte-yet Campground, which is on the banks of the Fraser in downtown Hope.

== Reserves ==
Their main reserve Chawathil 4 is located by Katz, a station of the Canadian Pacific Railway. It comprises almost 90% of their total landbase of 614.1 ha (1517 acres).

- Hope 1, 3.9 ha (9.6 acres)
- Schkam 2, 54.3 ha (134.1 acres)
- Greenwood Island 3, 4.0 ha. (9.9 acres)
- Chawathil 4, 551.0 ha. (1361.0 acres)
- Tunnel 6, 0.9 ha (2.2 acres)
