= Squiala First Nation =

First Nation band in Canada

Squiala First Nation or Squiala Indian Band (Halkomelem: Sxwoyehálá also spelt as Sxwoyehà꞉là) is a band government of the Stó꞉lō people located in the Upper Fraser Valley region, near Chilliwack, British Columbia, Canada. They are a member government of the Stó꞉lō Nation tribal council.
