= Cheam First Nation =

First Nations band government

Cheam Indian Band (Halkomelem: Xwchí꞉yò꞉m) is a First Nations band government of the Stó:lō people in the Upper Fraser Valley region of British Columbia, Canada, located near the community of Rosedale. They traditionally speak the Upriver dialect of Halkomelem, one of the Salishan family of languages. The name Cheam means "wild strawberry place" and is the namesake of Mount Cheam, which overlooks the community and most of the Upper Fraser Valley. They are a member government of the Sto:lo Tribal Council, one of two Sto:lo tribal councils.

The band services two reserves on the north shore of Cheam Lake, home to 354 people with another 200 living off the reserve.

== Treaty Process ==
Like other members of the Sto:lo Tribal Council, the Cheam are not participating in the British Columbia Treaty Process.
