= Skowkale First Nation =

First Nation in British Columbia, Canada

Skowkale First Nation or Skowkale Band (Halkomelem: Sqʼewqéyl) is a band government of the Sto:lo people located in the Upper Fraser Valley region, near Sardis, part of Chilliwack, British Columbia, Canada. They are a member government of the Stó꞉lō Nation tribal council.
