= Kwaw-kwaw-Apilt First Nation =

First Nation in British Columbia, Canada

Kwaw-kwaw-Apilt First Nation or Kwaw-kwaw-Apilt Indian Band (Halkomelem: Qweqweʼópelhp) is a band government of the Stó꞉lō people located in the Upper Fraser Valley region near Chilliwack, British Columbia, Canada. They are a member government of the Stó꞉lō Tribal Council.
