= Matsqui First Nation =

First Nation band government of the Matsqui people

- Band No. 565
- People: Matsqui people
- Province: British Columbia

Population (2022)
- On reserve: 97
- On other land: 16
- Off reserve: 153
- Total population: 266

Tribal Council
- Sto:lo Nation

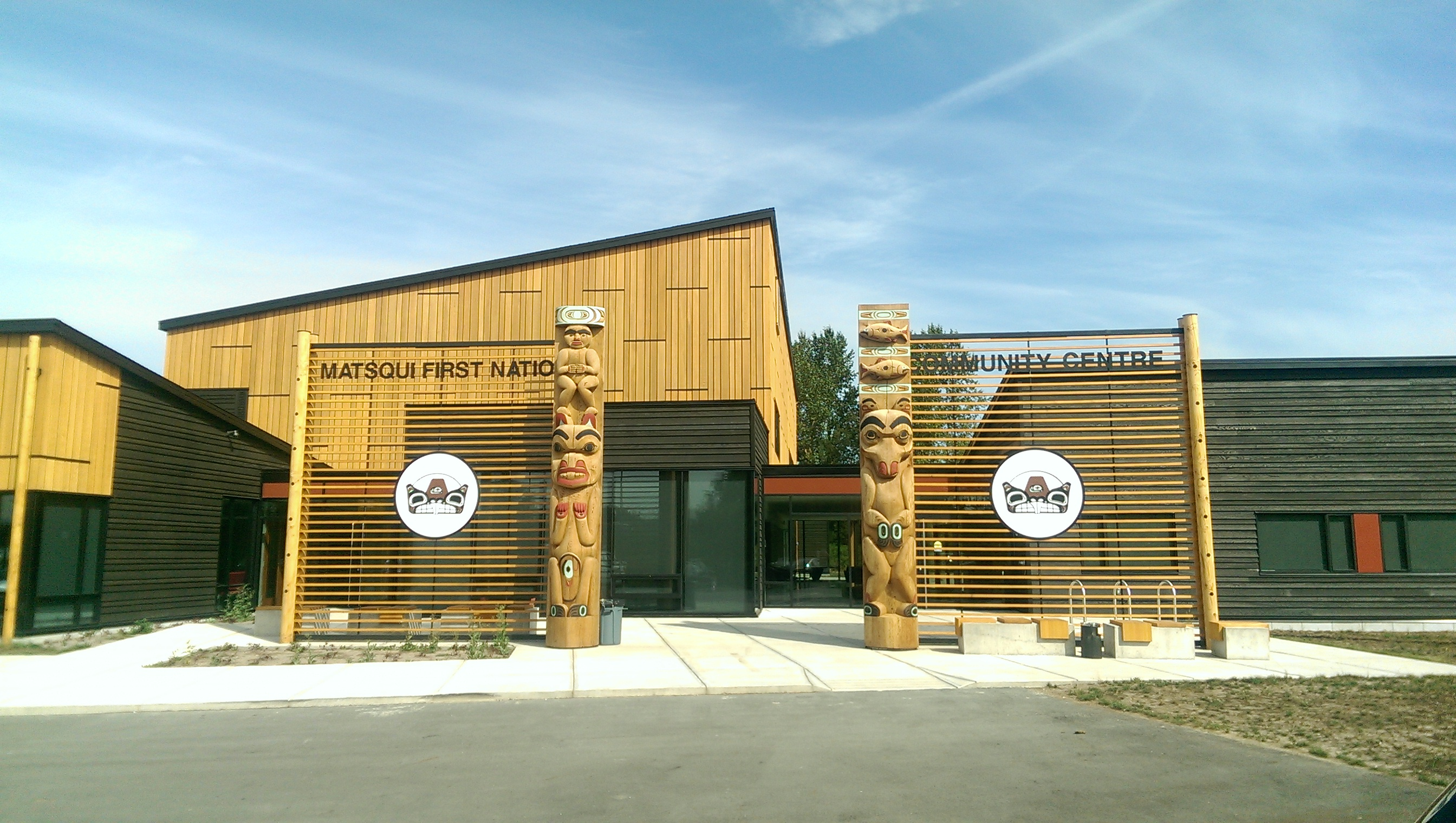
Matsqui’s Administration Building

Matsqui First Nation (Halkomelem: Máthxwi) is the band government of the Matsqui people, a Sto:lo Aboriginal group located in the Central Fraser Valley region, at Matsqui, in the northern part of Abbotsford, British Columbia, Canada. They are a member government of the Sto:lo Nation tribal council.

Its governance structure is a custom electoral system. The current chief is Alice McKay.

== Description ==
Matsqui Nation and its inhabitants are currently located within the central Fraser River area located within the province of British Columbia in Canada and extends along the Fraser River valley from the Crescent Islands to the Sumas Mountains and goes south beyond the Canada–United States border. The Fraser river area is also inhabited by 11 other nations to form the Stó:lõ people or the "People of the River" which the Matsqui Tribe is a part of. All the first nations inhabiting this area have their areas of residence marked by watersheds. Specifically, the Matsqui First Nation currently reside within the part of the Fraser River downriver of the Sawmill Creek. Typically, the Matsqui Tribe emphasized a strong sense of connection to the land they inhabit and that, unlike those who come from abroad, they have been, they are, and will always be native to the land they reside in.

As of 2022, there are 265 members of the Matsqui First Nation, 152 of whom live off the reserve (table indicates governmental records as opposed to nation's records, see references 1 and 2). The current chief is Alice McKay who, with other tribe members such as counselor Brenda Morgan and Ryan Bird, form the committee representing the Matsqui within the Stó:lõ Nation Chiefs Council.

The Matsqui First Nation uses two main languages, the Halq'eméylem and the Nooksack languages, and are one of only two First Nations that are bilingual within the Stó:lõ family, the other being the Chilliwack. This is due to the shared history of both the Matsqui people and the Nooksack speaking Ska-leih-hes tribe. The name of the nation itself, Matsqui, is the English version of Máthxwi which is derived from the root word má:th which is the Halqeméylem word for a plant that grows in the large marshes. Because it's attributed to Matsqui's watersheds, the word Máthxwi is typically translated something around like easy passage, given how it's apparently easy to travel through current Matsqui territory due to its environment.

The Matsqui speak two languages due to shared history with the Ska-leih-hes tribe and this is due to the modern members of the Matsqui Tribe being descendants of both the ancestral Matsqui people and the Nooksack speaking Ska-leih-hes people. According to Henry Custer who was a surveyor in 1858 who visited the region currently inhabited by the Matsqui noted that two interconnected lived between the Fraser and the Nooksack rivers. They often had good relations with each other and, according to oral history recorded by P.R. Jeffcott, members of the Ska-leih-hes tribe migrated to Canada where they are believed to have originally come from. The Matsqui also are part of the Stó:lō Nation Society to work with the ten other sister Stó:lō tribes to address concerns regarding their First Nations as a whole due to their shared cultural aspects and history.

== History ==
The earliest records within the Fraser river area show that human inhabitance can be clearly confirmed within the area as early as nine thousand years ago and that, by five thousand years ago, when the climate in British Columbia settled, there was the existence of a unique Salish form of cultural expression which is similar to that of today, showing cultural continuity from then till now among the Stó:lõ people which the Matsqui people is a part of. This tribe also developed a hierarchal society whereby by about 1450ce, a small minority held the majority of the political power, possibly caused by the fact that the Matsqui were known for having a sedentary lifestyle and being very migratory according to latest research.

As soon as European contact arrived within the Pacific Northwest, fur trade followed and with that came very significant changes from the new tools that natives began using to the great increase in potlatches. Indeed, it is the case that, because of the increase of tools and overall trade with the Europeans trading for fur, most tribes began throwing extravagant potlatches to display their wealth to other tribes to the point that this began to replace war as grounds of battle and it was because of this that art increased as more tools and higher demand led to the increase of more elaborate Totem poles and other pieces of artwork. Within the later British Columbia gold rush, Governor James Douglas worked closely with the Salish natives to ensure that both would benefit from the gold rush that was approaching for a time being. However, as gold seekers from San Francisco began moving up to the Fraser River area, they began encroaching on Salish territory and threatening the natives with violence should they prevent the miners from mining. This led to the Fraser Canyon War which eventually forced Salish natives to roll back their resistance in addition to the fact that with the influx of American miners came smallpox that took out nearly fifty to seventy-five percent of the native population within the area. With the Matsqui, it was at about ninety percent.

The first person to come in control of the general area was James Douglas and while his role was to confirm the crown's property over the land, he regularly used money and treaties to buy land from the natives residing within the area and did grant the native communities living there a great amount of land in their own reserves. This, however, was not to say that his rule was all peaceful. During this time period, the Stó:lõ people were protesting for land rights and while Douglas was about accept their requests and register the reserves with the appropriate sizes, he retired beforehand and under control of Trutch, the reserve sizes were actually cut by eighty percent and, specifically for the Matsqui people, we find that their reserves were cut by even more than that where it decreased from 3,887 hectares to just sixty. And this was to continue because when the area finally became an admitted province in 1871, unlike the rest of Canada, British Columbia began disregarding the use of treaties to deal with native land and, while understanding of the specific cases of land use unique to British Columbia, did allot less lands overall than what was required by the Canadian government at the time.

The Matsqui First Nation, along with ten other nations, form the Stó:lō Nation Society which was created as the result of the merging of several independent Stó:lō organizations that were created to defend the rights of groups of Stó:lō peoples against the 1969 Liberal Indian Policy. The 1969 Liberal Indian Policy, also known as the White Paper, was a policy pushed by Prime Minister Pierre Trudeau and Minister of Indian Affairs and Northern Development Jean Chrétien to abolish all previous treaties with first nations, especially the Indian Act which is the main act responsible for determining Indian status and the administration of reserve land. Eventually, through the realization of their shared interests in protecting the rights of the Stó:lō peoples, they eventually banded together to form the Stó:lō Nation Society in 1994. Now, the Stó:lõ Nation Chiefs Council focuses on the issue of the discovery of mass graves with 200 unmarked burials close to a former residential school in Kamloops to investigate them and potentially missing children further and to find if similar situations have occurred in other residential schools found within the Fraser river area. Besides this, the Matsqui First Nation specifically also had to deal with a very significant project which was the Trans Mountain Project which was made in order to bring in more oil from Alberta to British Columbia. This happens to run through Matsqui territory which is something of concern for the Matsqui First Nation. Other issues the Matsqui are also working on are salmon fishing rights and cranberry picking rights.

== Cultural aspects ==
The entire Stó:lō peoples as a group share a collective origin story (sxwoxwiyá:m) concerning how the world came about. Specifically, they all share the same belief for the same Xe:Xá:ls, a group of three brothers and a sister that collectively shaped the world we know today and that it was the case before this shaping occurred that the different beings as we know them today like humans and animals were indistinguishable from each other. It was through the work of Xe:Xá:ls that the human, the plants and the animals took on their now recognizable forms. However, they also transformed the tribes of the Stó:lō peoples’ first founders into animals or plants. Specifically, for the Matsqui people, their tribe's founder Sk-Elê’yitl, according to their own sxwoxwiyá:m, was transformed to a beaver by Xe:Xá:ls. The beaver is credited with bringing fire and salmon to the entirety of the Stó:lō peoples and because of their ability to move around, a beaver anywhere within Stó:lō territory can remind the Matsqui people of their heritage. The idea that the entire history of a people is only recorded orally means that the Matsqui people uphold a standard of complete honesty when telling such stories that, should a person get it wrong, they could be disgraced and barred from telling a story again as they would've disrespected their own history and that of their community.
