= Chʼiyáqtel First Nation =

First Nation band in British Columbia, Canada

Chʼiyáqtel First Nation (formerly Tzeachten First Nation) is a band government of the Stó꞉lō people located in the Upper Fraser Valley region near Chilliwack, British Columbia, Canada. They are a member government of the Stó꞉lō Nation tribal council.

The traditional language of the Chʼiyáqtel is Halqʼeméylem.

== History ==
In 2024, Chʼiyáqtel announced that it had acquired 50 acres of land adjacent to existing reserve lands.
