= Stó꞉lō =

Group of First Nations peoples in British Columbia, Canada

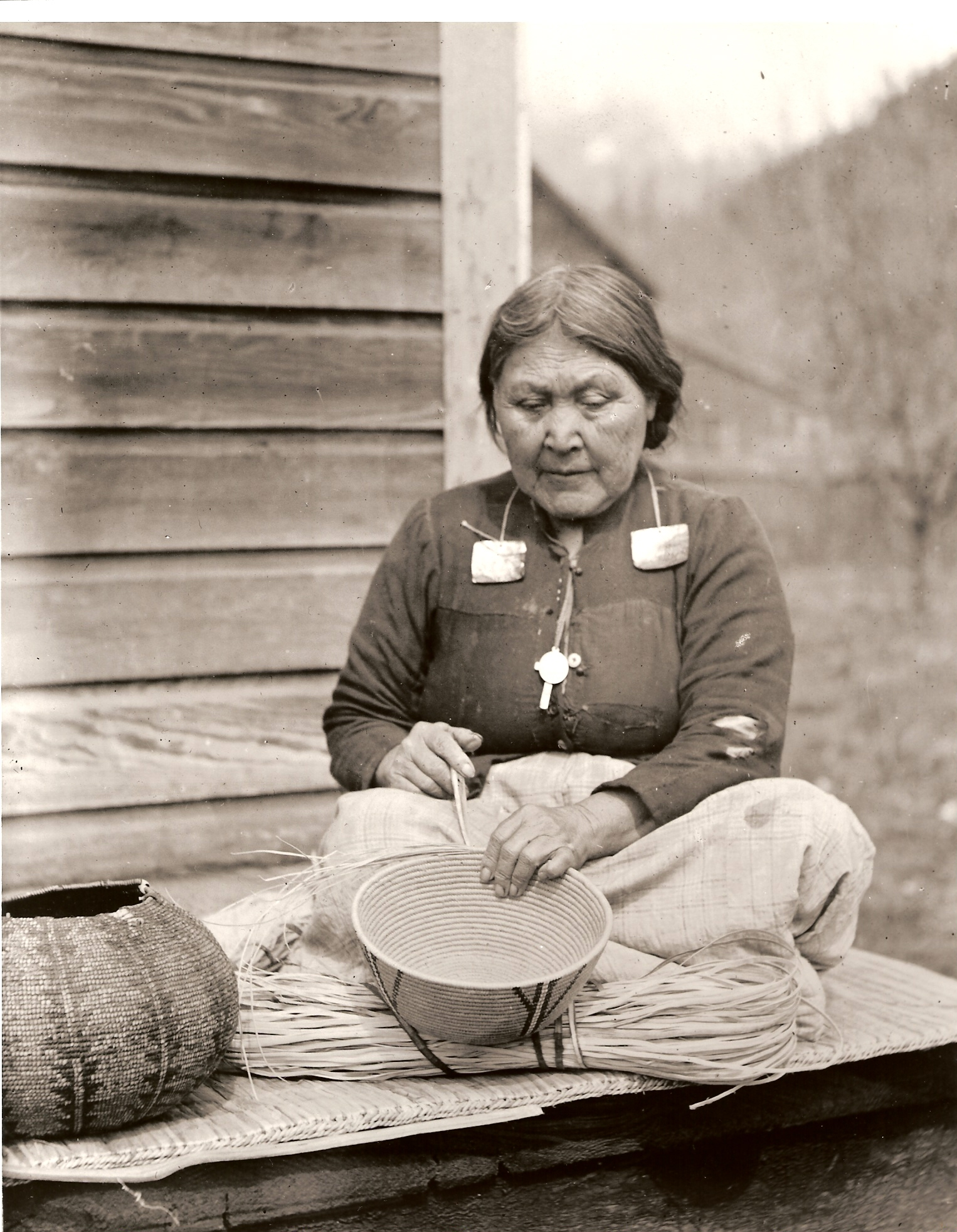
- Stó꞉lō woman with cedar baskets

Total population
- 8,876 (2017)

Regions with significant populations
- Canada (British Columbia)

Languages
- English, Upriver Halkomelem

Religion
- Christianity, Animism

Related ethnic groups
- Coast Salish

The Stó꞉lō (/ˈstɔːloʊ/), alternately written as Sto꞉lo, Stó꞉lô, or Stó꞉lõ, historically as Staulo, Stalo or Stahlo, and historically known and commonly referred to in ethnographic literature as the Fraser River Indians or Lower Fraser Salish, are a group of First Nations peoples inhabiting the Fraser Valley and lower Fraser Canyon of British Columbia, Canada, part of the loose grouping of Coast Salish nations. Stó꞉lō is the Halqemeylem word for "river", so the Stó꞉lō are the river people. The first documented reference to these people as "the Stó꞉lō" occurs in Catholic Oblate missionary records from the 1880s. Prior to this, references were primarily to individual tribal groups such as Matsqui, Ts’elxweyeqw, or Sumas.

== Origins ==
The first traces of people living in the Fraser Valley date from 4,000 to 10,000 years ago. The Stó꞉lō called this area, their traditional territory, S'ólh Téméxw. The early inhabitants of the area were highly mobile hunter-gatherers. There is archeological evidence of a settlement in the lower Fraser Canyon (called "the Milliken site" after historian August 'Gus' Milliken) and a seasonal encampment ("the Glenrose Cannery site") near the mouth of the Fraser River. Remains of this latter campsite show that in spring and early summer, the people came here to hunt land and sea mammals, such as deer, elk, and seals and, to a lesser extent, to fish for salmon, stickleback, eulachon, and sturgeon and to gather shellfish. Their lives depended on their success at harvesting the resources of the land and the rivers through fishing, foraging, and hunting.

Contemporary Stó꞉lō elders describe their connection to the land in the statement "we have always been here." They tell of their arrival in S'ólh Téméxw as either Tel Swayel ("sky-born" people) or as Tel Temexw ("earth-born" people) and through the subsequent transformations of ancestral animals and fish such as the beaver, mountain goat, and sturgeon. Xexá:ls (transformers) fixed the world ("made it right") and the people and animals in it, creating the present landscape. As Carlson notes:

The Stó꞉lō walk simultaneously through both spiritual and physical realms of this landscape, connected to the Creator through the land itself, as transformed by Xexá:ls.

== History ==
=== Prehistory and archaeology ===
==== Early period ====
There is a continuous record of occupation of S'ólh Téméxw by First Nations people dating from the early Holocene period, 5,000 to 10,000 years ago. Two archaeological sites referred to in the Origins section are well documented. Additional archaeological evidence from the early period has been found throughout the region, including sites at Stave Lake, Coquitlam Lake, and Fort Langley.

==== Middle period ====
Many more sites exist that date from the middle Holocene period (c. 5,500–3,000 years ago). Tools found indicate considerable continuity with the early period. One striking feature of this period is the introduction of permanent house sites, showing evidence of cultural transmission from a nomadic to a more sedentary lifestyle between 5,000 and 4,000 years ago. Characteristic of this period were decorative and sculpted stone items, an increasingly complex relationship with the environment, and a more stable and increasingly complex culture. The now extinct Coast Salish woolly dog appeared for the first time during this period.

Among the oldest archaeological digs in Canada is Xá:ytem, at Hatzic, just east of present-day Mission. Initial work on a suburban housing project around a transformer stone aroused the interests of Stó꞉lō archaeologist, Gordon Mohs. The land eventually was transferred to Stó꞉lō governance for heritage purposes. The focus of the site is a large transformer stone which bears the name Xá:ytem. This has come to be used for the ancient village site that has been excavated in the surrounding field. There are two major eras found in the dig, one 3000BP and the other from 5000-9000BP. Both indicate posthole and timber-frame construction and advanced social and economic life. The site was eventually abandoned and covered by flooding and sediment during the ongoing evolution of the Fraser delta.

In the early 21st century, a group of structures known variously as the Fraser Valley Pyramids or Scowlitz Mounds at Harrison Bay, near Chehalis, are under investigation by a joint task force of the Scowlitz First Nation and archaeologists. Little is known about the mounds, which appear to be burial mounds and which contain timber structures to sustain the weight of the mound. Because they are distinct from any other structures anywhere else in the region, the people who made them may not have been forebears of the Stó꞉lō peoples.

==== Late period ====
This period extends from 3,000 years ago to first contact with European people. New forms of ground stone technology, including slate knives, slate points, hand mauls, nephrite chisels, and nephrite adzes, are evidence of an increasingly specialized society evolving during this period. Social class distinctions were accompanied by changing house forms that indicated expanding households. Warfare became increasingly widespread.

=== Contact with Europeans ===
Although Captains José María Narváez of Spain and George Vancouver of England explored the Georgia Strait in 1791 and 1792, respectively, they did not reach the Fraser River or Stó꞉lō territory. The first contact between the Stó꞉lō and Europeans was indirect, through the transmission of infectious disease via other Indigenous peoples.

=== Smallpox ===
There are two main theories for how the smallpox virus first reached the Stó꞉lō in late 1782. The first is that the disease came up from Mexico spreading with overland travelers, the second and more likely theory is that it was brought to the coast through trade routes with Europeans. It is estimated that the epidemic killed two thirds of the Stó꞉lō population, approximately 61%, within six weeks. During the epidemic traditional responses to illness may have made the outbreak worse. One method was gathering around the sick person’s bed to sing and pray. This exposed more people to the virus. Other practices included cleansing sweats and cold morning baths which would have shocked the infected person’s body causing more harm.

Those who survived were affected with blindness and other permanent disabilities making hunting and other activities difficult. This caused many people to suffer from hunger along with the emotional damage from debilitation. Stó꞉lō culture is based on an oral tradition, and with the decimation of the community, large amounts of important cultural information were lost.

By the late 19th century, the Stó꞉lō's by then extended contact with Europeans enabled them to learn about and get vaccinated for protection against smallpox. The effects of the 1862 Pacific Northwest smallpox epidemic on the Stó꞉lō were limited in comparison with many other indigenous people, because they had been inoculated with the smallpox vaccine. Although deadly smallpox epidemics broke out at least once more (and possibly in 1824 and 1862), it was, however, only one of a number of serious diseases that would be brought to the area by European colonizers. Measles, mumps, tuberculosis, influenza, and venereal diseases also caused high fatalities among the Stó꞉lō population.

=== Simon Fraser and Fort Langley ===
Soon after the 1782 epidemic, the Stó꞉lō encountered Europeans face to face. The first European to explore the region from overland was Simon Fraser, who travelled down the river that bears his name in 1808. The Hudson's Bay Company established trading posts at Fort Langley (in 1827) and Fort Yale (1848). Their involvement in trading with the British brought great changes to the relationships of the Stó꞉lō with each other and with the land.

Although the HBC built the posts with the fur trade in mind, trade in salmon soon took over as the primary item of exchange. Between 1830 and 1849, Fort Langley's purchases of salmon increased from 200 barrels to 2610 barrels. The Kwantlen branch of the Stó꞉lō relocated their main village to the proximity of the fort, partly to maintain primacy in trade with the company and partly for protection from competitors. The fort repelled an attack by the Euclataws of Quadra Island, helping to bring an end to slave raids on the lower Fraser by northern tribes. But, slave raiding continued for several decades after the establishment of Ft. Langley.

=== Douglas and Trutch ===
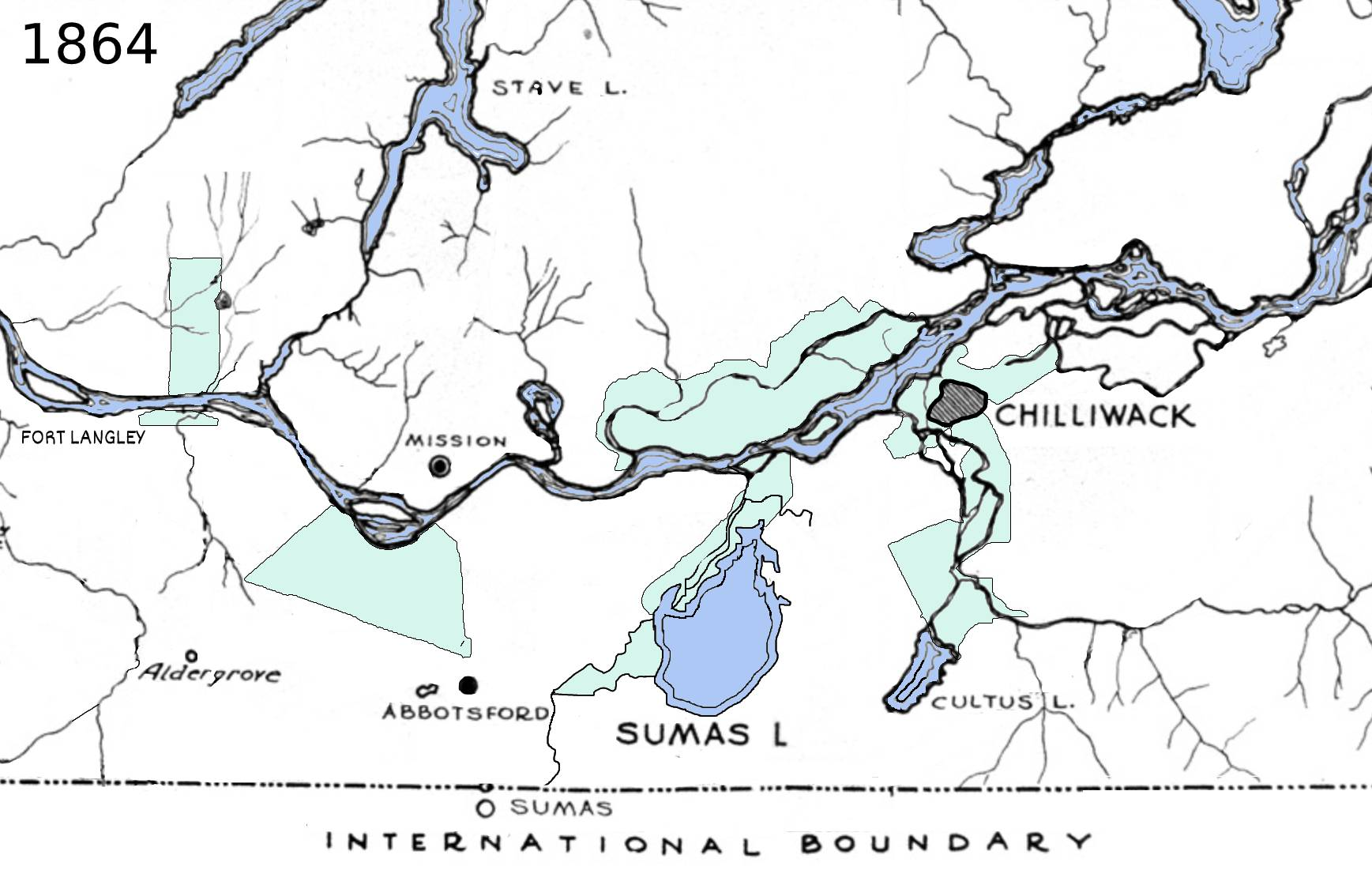
William McColl's May 1864 Map of Central Fraser Valley First Nation Reserves, shown in green

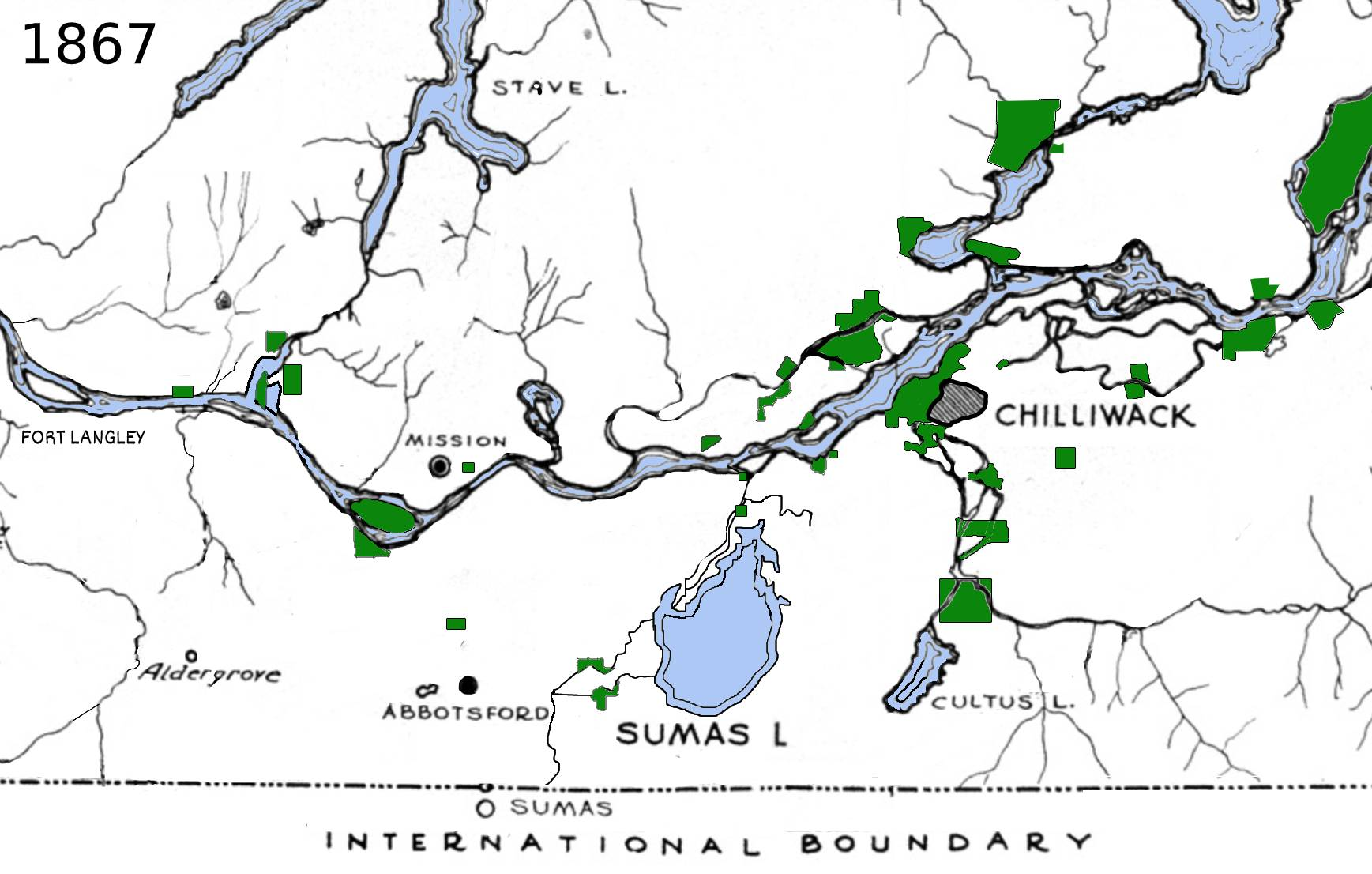
Fraser Valley First Nation reserves after the Joseph Trutch adjustment in 1867

After Simon Fraser’s arrival in 1808 and the establishment of Fort Langley in 1827 the gold rush began in 1858. With the discovery of gold came the influx of over 30,000 miners with goals of striking it rich. These miners created many problems as they encroached closely to Stó꞉lō communities, resources, and homes. With the fierce competition over land many disputes arose concerning the ownership of land and the damage that was being caused by the miners. Governor James Douglas recognized these issues and tried to separate the Stó꞉lō and miners by creating separate territories for each group to occupy. This began the long history of land disputes between the Stó꞉lō and settlers. As the miners left in large numbers by 1860 the whiskey peddlers came in selling their "fire water" to the Stó꞉lō. Shortly after this more permanent immigrants arrived and began to establish farms. Because no treaties had been signed between the Stó꞉lō and the government, the settlement of this land was not in accordance with the Royal Proclamation of 1763 that stated that all land acquisition from the Aboriginals had to be done legally through a treaty process.

No treaties were ever made in BC, and although Governor Douglas planned to create them, the gold rush and subsequent immigration rush hindered this. The main goal of his plan was the assimilation of the Stó꞉lō into European culture. He hoped to have Stó꞉lō pre-empt crown land for agricultural development and have them lease out parts of the reserves to non-Aboriginal farmers to aid in assimilation. While waiting to be able to negotiate treaties, which were a very expensive process, he attempted to create large Indian reserves of at least 40 hectares per family.

Douglas also promised the Stó꞉lō fair compensation for all the land outside of the reserves being occupied by settlers. While setting up the reserves the Stó꞉lō were asked to help mark the territories themselves as it was recognized that only they would know what lands needed to be included such as berry patches, transformer sites, and burial grounds (although many spiritual sites were not revealed to ensure their secrecy). Sergeant William McColl was directed in 1864 by Douglas to create the reserves. The surveyors outlined 15,760 hectares through present day Abbotsford, Chilliwack, and Mission. This may seem like a large amount of land, but was small in comparison to the land available to settlers.

Soon after the survey was completed Douglas retired and McColl died. Joseph Trutch, the Chief Commissioner of Lands and Works, was placed in charge of the reserves. He felt that the Stó꞉lō did not need most of the land promised to them by Douglas and McColl. Trutch believed that if the land was not being used for agrarian purposes it was not required. He reduced the reserves by 91% in 1867, siding with the settlers who had begun to build homes and farms in the area. Trutch also took away many of the rights that Douglas had given to the Stó꞉lō. They no longer were allowed to participate in government or able to pre-empt or purchase land outside of the reserves. In the years following these events the federal and provincial governments have paid very little attention to the problems that First Nations people have been experiencing in British Columbia. In 1990 British Columbia acknowledged that Aboriginal rights to land and resources needed to be extinguished by treaty as stated in the 1763 Royal Proclamation. They created the BC Treaty Commission to help deal with these issues.

=== St. Mary's Residential School ===
St. Mary's Indian Residential School was the name of two Indian residential schools in Mission, British Columbia. It was first operated by the Roman Catholic Church of Canada and secondly by the Canadian federal government. The school had approximately 2000 children in attendance with most of them Stó꞉lō. Opened in 1863 as a school of boys housing 42 students in its first year a girls section was added in 1868, but was split off and operated by the Sisters of St. Ann. That school later moved in 1882 so that construction of the Canadian Pacific Railway could take place. The boys and girls lived separately. There was emphasis on the catechism of the Roman Catholic Church and academics. Later, there was a shift to agriculture and industrial vocations including woodworking, attending mass, ironing and sewing. Parents were allowed to visit and some camped around school. Students were given permission to visit the city of Mission until 1948. On arrival at the school students were assigned lockers, beds and dormitory. They were also checked for lice and given two sets of clothes to be worn and marked.

Accounts of abuse at the school vary from person to person and at different eras. Terry Glavin writes that in the 1800s, there was no corporal punishment at all, but in later periods strapping became routine, and for some students, conditions were nightmarish.

In 1952, 16 students graduated with full grade 12 diplomas. In 1961, the students moved to a new government-run residential school of the same name on the eastern border of Mission, and the Roman Catholic School was closed. In 1985, all buildings of the former schools were destroyed, making it the last residential school in British Columbia. The grounds of the school are now part of Fraser River Heritage Park. New Bell Tower, built in 2000, also housed the 1875 original bell from Mission. The Mission Indian Friendship Centre in 2001 provided funds to build a covered picnic shelter in the park. The park is also home to the OMI cemetery where nun, students land and buildings of government–nun school were initially leased to the Coqualeetza Training Centre after 1985. In 2005, the park was returned to the Stó꞉lō and given Indian reserve status. The land formally regained its Stó꞉lō name of pekw’xe: yles (Peckquaylis) and it is used by 21 different first nations governments.

== Culture ==
=== Language ===
The language traditionally spoken by the Stó꞉lō people is Halq'eméylem, the "Upriver dialect" of Halkomelem. Halq'eméylem is primarily spoken in Harrison Lake, lower Fraser Canyon, and the upper and central Fraser Valley. The dialect is included in the Coast Salish language family. While there are 278 fluent speakers of the dialects of Halkomelem, there are fewer than five fluent speakers of Halq'eméylem. Of these, the speakers who have achieved fluency are of dotage. Because of this, several speakers have been lost in each successive year. In turn, the language is facing the threat of extinction.

In residential schools, such as St. Mary's Residential School in Mission, BC, students were prohibited from speaking their language. If students did speak their language instead of the desired English, they would often be punished physically or mentally to reinforce which language was to be spoken – or not spoken. With a lack of opportunity to speak ʼeméylem in their environment and inability to go home in most cases, students in attendance at residential schools frequently lost their language. In present day, the trend of individuals not being able to speak their language continues. English has still been taking precedence over the speaking of Halq'eméylem. With those who have fluency in the language passing away, and children not being raised in environments in which Halq'eméylem is learned and utilized as English has.

As the Stó꞉lō people, like other Aboriginal groups, consider their language to be an important aspect of their culture, there have been efforts made to revitalize Halq'eméylem. One of the central parties that has been involved in the preservation of the language is the Stó꞉lō Shxweli Halqʼeméylem Language Program. In 1994, the program originated under the wing of the education department of the Stó꞉lō Nation's Community Economic Development division. It was established in the efforts to teach members of the community the language and be able to have these community members teach the language to others. In addition, the development of curriculum in Halq'eméylem was desired.

The initial program has led to the Stó꞉lō Shxweli Halqʼeméylem Language Program working with post-secondary institutions in British Columbia to allow course offerings to students regardless of background. Among the post-secondary schools offering Halq'eméylem is the University of the Fraser Valley, Simon Fraser University, and the University of British Columbia.

An additional effort the Stó꞉lō Shxweli Halqʼeméylem Language Program has partaken in their efforts to revitalize and document the language is by using technology. The language staff involved in the program established an ongoing language archive on the mobile and website application First Voices. The number of singular words archived from the Halq'eméylem is 1745. Furthermore, 667 phrases have been archived on the website in Halq'eméylem.

=== Salmon ===
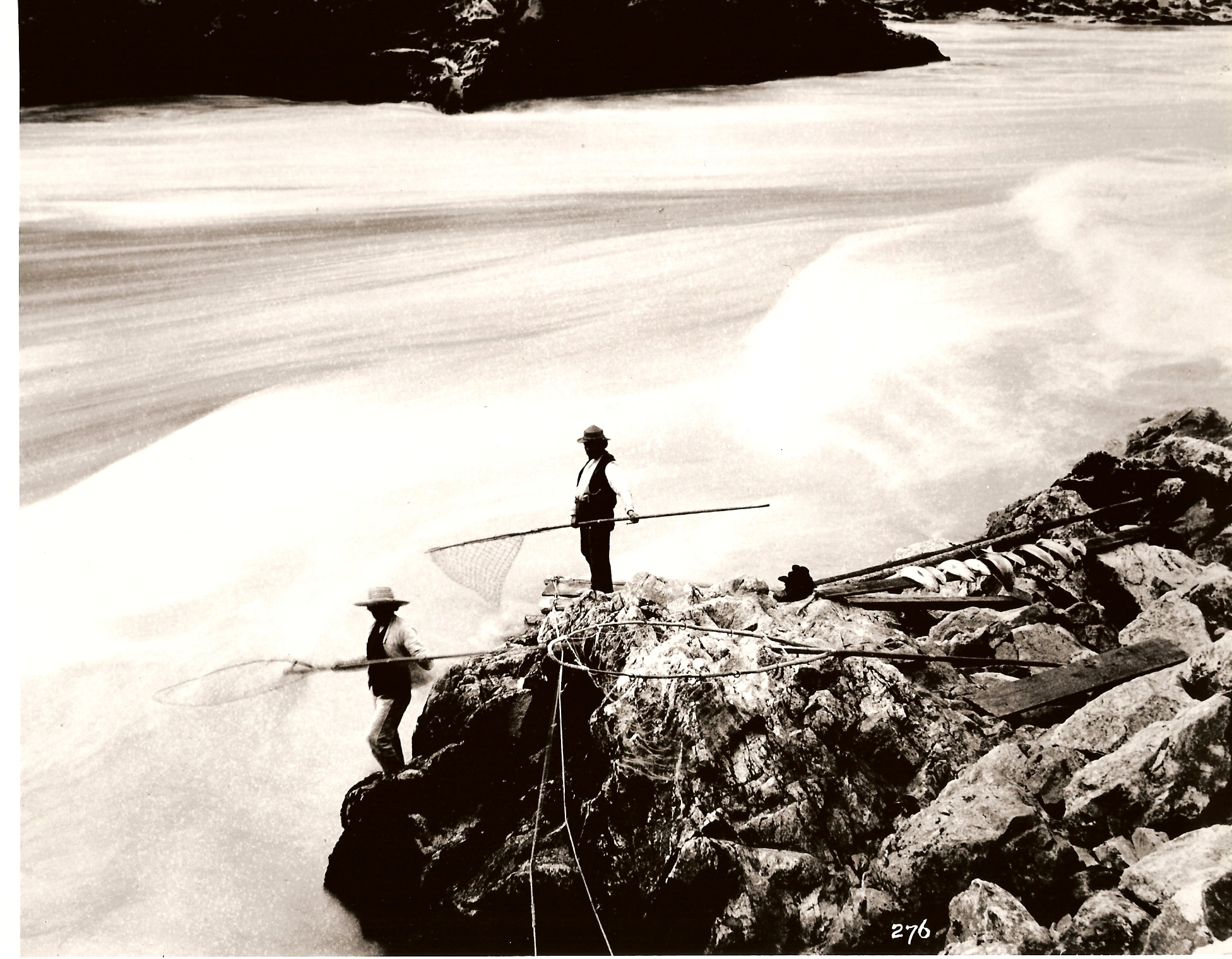
Stó꞉lō people fishing on the Fraser River with dipnets

Coast Salish towns and villages were located along the waterways in watersheds, both for access to water for cooking and drinking, and for salmon fishing. Its importance in their culture was reflected in ceremonies dedicated to it. The various tribes, sometimes named by Europeans for the river they were located near, fished on the Fraser River and its tributaries, including the Chilliwack and the Harrison. Important parts of the community life of the people were related to the life cycle of the salmon. Ceremonies such as the First Salmon ceremony, performed when the first fish was caught each year, reflected its importance in Stó꞉lō culture.

The First Salmon Ceremony was held when the first salmon were brought back from the river. It was then shared with either the entire community or more privately in a family setting. After the salmon meat was eaten the bones of the fish were then returned to the river. This was to show respect to the salmon people. If the ceremony was not performed and the fish not shared it was said that the fisher would experience bad luck for the rest of the year and the salmon run may not be as strong.

Salmon was the preferred food of the Stó꞉lō and was seen as superior to other types of meat. Meat and salmon were classified differently and salmon was said to give individuals energy while meat makes you feel heavy and lazy. In order to have salmon through the off seasons it was preserved through two different methods. In the summer salmon was wind dried with salt in the Fraser Canyon. In the fall salmon was smoked, this was traditionally done for a week or two but with modern refrigeration technology smoking is only done for a few days. Dried salmon was then either boiled or steamed before eating.

Salmon was not only used for food, it was also crucial for trading. This began when the Hudson’s Bay Company set up trading posts in Stó꞉lō territory. They originally wanted the Stó꞉lō to hunt beaver for them but quickly learned that the Stó꞉lō had little interest in beaver. The Hudson Bay Company then began to ask for salmon after seeing the impressive hauls that were being made. In August 1829 the Stó꞉lō traded Fort Langley 7000 Salmon.

Since European settlement in Stó꞉lō territory the salmon have been experiencing decreases in numbers. Major contributions to this include the building of the CPR, agriculture, and forestry. One of the newer major issues is the expanding farmed salmon industry. The farmed salmon are transferring lice and disease to the wild salmon. This is further harming the already dwindling numbers.

=== Societal structure ===
Stó꞉lō society was organized into classes: the sí꞉yá꞉m (or upper classes), the ordinary people, and the slaves, who were usually captives taken from enemy tribes in raids or warfare. A person's family status was important in determining their role within Stó꞉lō society, and within Longhouse ceremonies, though this has faded over time. Slaves may have been treated relatively well, but they were not permitted to eat with others at the Longhouse fire. They were primarily responsible for daily tasks such as gathering nuts, fruits and other foods, or firewood. The use of slaves died out in the nineteenth century. As the practice was dying out there was a settlement of former slaves called Freedom Village (Halkomelem: Chiʼckim). In some bands, the memory of which families descend from slaves may persist.

The Síyá꞉m (leader) were the most influential members of each family. Expert hunters were referred to as Tewit and led during the hunting season. Leaders with influence over entire villages or tribal groups were sometimes known as the Yewal Síyá꞉m (high leaders).

=== Housing and shelter ===
The primary shelter for the Stó꞉lō people was in the form of a longhouse. Although some modern longhouses were built with gabled roofs, most Stó꞉lō longhouses were built with a single flat, but slanted roof, similar to the Xá꞉ytem Longhouse. Entire extended families would live in a longhouse, and the structure could be extended as the family expanded. Pit houses (or Quiggly hole houses) also were used during earlier generations.

=== Transportation ===
Although river and lake canoes were built within Stó꞉lō, larger ocean-going canoes were primarily acquired through trade with indigenous people of the coast and Vancouver island. In the late nineteenth century, the emphasis on water transportation was replaced first by horse and buggy, then by train and automobile.

=== Adolescence and adulthood ===
Traditionally, Stó꞉lō girls went through puberty rites at the time of their first menstruation. A pubescent girl would be brought to a pit lined with cedar boughs and told to remain there during daylight hours, leaving only to eat and sleep. Women would bring her fir boughs and instruct her to pick out the needles one at a time, but this was the only work she would be allowed to do; other women would feed and wash the girl until her first menstrual period was over. This custom was practiced widely, at least until youth were sent to residential schools.

== Government ==
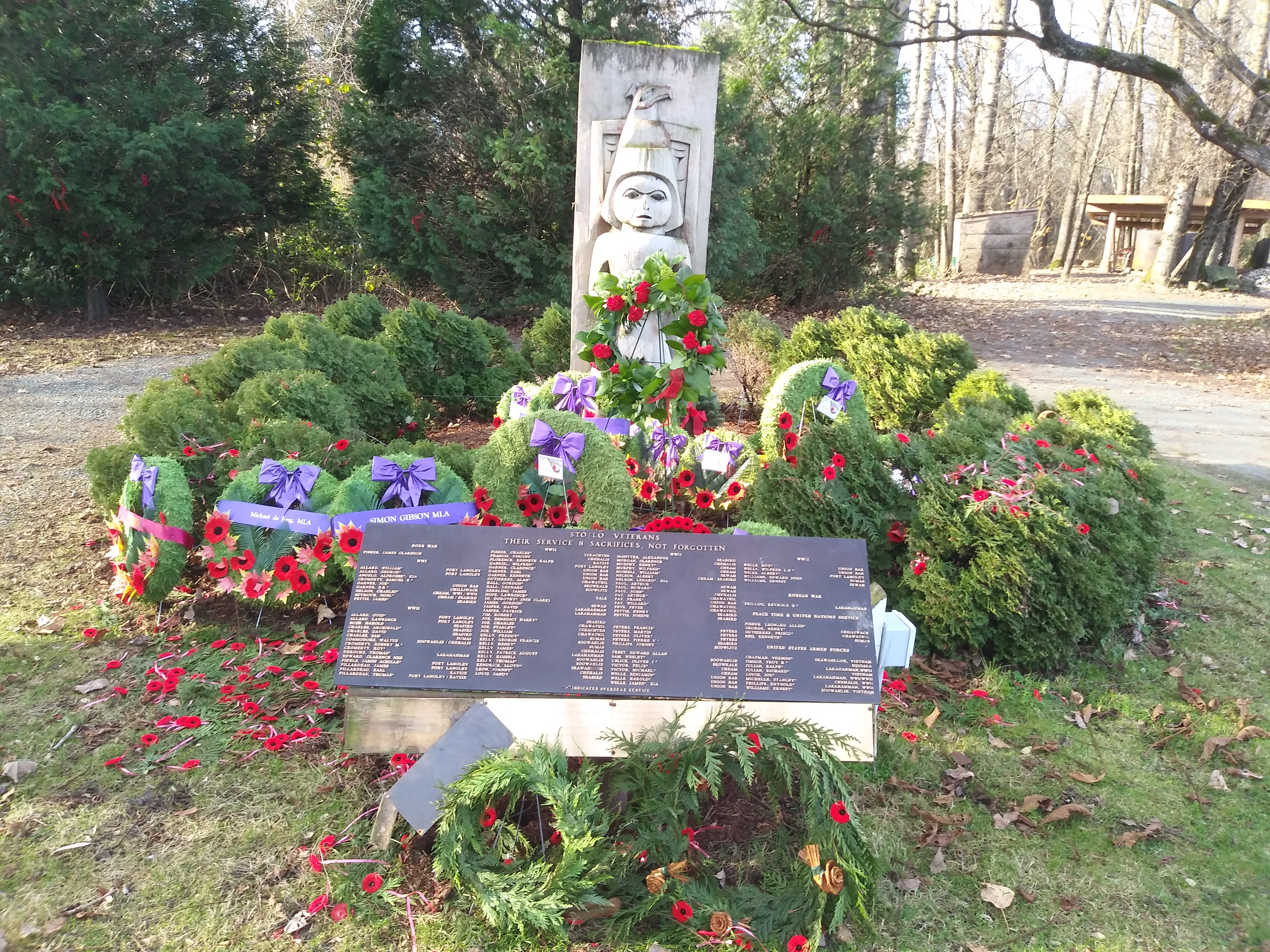
The Stó꞉lō Veteran's Pole Memorial Dec 2018

The Stó꞉lō have two elected tribal councils: the Sto꞉lo Nation Chiefs Council and the Stó꞉lō Tribal Council. Several bands belong to each council and some to both.

Six bands belong to neither council (see below for list). The Chehalis Indian Band of the Sts'ailes people on the Harrison River, while ethnically and linguistically similar, is among a number of First Nations governments in the region who have distanced themselves from Stó꞉lō collective governance. Others include the Musqueam Indian Band (Xwməθkwəy̓əm/X'Muzk'I'Um people), Tsleil-Waututh First Nation (historic: Burrard [Inlet] Indian Band, Səl̓ílwətaʔ/Selilwitulh people), Tsawwassen First Nation (Sc̓əwaθən Məsteyəx people), and Semiahmoo First Nation (Semyome people).

=== Members of the Stó꞉lō Nation Chiefs Council ===
- Aitchelitz First Nation (Áthelets/Ăthelets people, part of the Ts'elxwéyeqw (Chilliwack) tribe.)
- Leq'á:mel First Nation (former Nicomen Island Band, also known as Lakahahmen First Nation, Leq'ámel/Leq'á:mel people.)
- Matsqui First Nation (Máthxwi people.)
- Popkum First Nation (Popkum Band, Pópkw’em people, part of the Tiyt (Tait) tribe or Upper Stó:lō tribe.)
- Skway First Nation (official: Shxwhá:y Village, pre-2004: Squay First Nation, Shxwhá:y Village, part of the Ts'elxwéyeqw (Chilliwack) tribe.)
- Skawahlook First Nation (Sq'ewá:lxw/Sq'ewá:lx̲w people, part of the Tiyt (Tait) tribe or Upper Stó:lō tribe.)
- Skowkale First Nation (Skowkale Band, historic: Skulkayn Band, Sq’ewqeyl/Sq'ewqéyl people, part of the Ts'elxwéyeqw (Chilliwack) tribe.)
- Squiala First Nation (Sxwoyehà:là/Sxwoyehálá people, part of the Ts'elxwéyeqw (Chilliwack) tribe.)
- Sumas First Nation (Pepa:thxetel people, better known as Semà:th / Smá:th (Sumas) tribe.)
- Tzeachten First Nation (Ch'íyáqtel people, part of the Ts'elxwéyeqw (Chilliwack) tribe.)
- Yakweakwioose First Nation (Yakweakwioose Band, Yeqwyeqwí:ws people, part of the Ts'elxwéyeqw (Chilliwack) tribe.)

=== Members of the Stó꞉lō Tribal Council ===
- Chawathil First Nation (Chawathil Indian Band, Chowéthel, pre-1988: Hope Indian Band, part of the Tiyt (Tait) tribe or Upper Stó:lō tribe.)
- Cheam First Nation (Cheam Indian Band, Xwchí:yò:m/XwChiyo:m people, part of the Pelóxwlh Mestiyexw (Pilalt/Pil’alt) tribe.)
- Kwantlen First Nation (pre-1994: Langley Indian Band, Qʼʷa:n̓ƛʼən̓/Qw'ó:ntl'an or Qw'ó:ltl'el people.)
- Kwaw-kwaw-Apilt First Nation (Kwaw-kwaw-Apilt Indian Band, Qweqwe'opelhp people, part of the Pelóxwlh Mestiyexw (Pilalt/Pil’alt) tribe.)
- Sq'éwlets First Nation (Formerly called Scowlitz First Nation, Sq’éwlets or Sqwōwich people, Sq’éwlets/Sqwōwich (Scowlitz) tribe.)
- Seabird Island First Nation (Seabird Island Band, Sq'éwqel/Sq’ewqeyl/Sq'ewqéyl people, part of the Tiyt (Tait) tribe or Upper Stó:lō tribe, today a composite band made up of residents from many different Coastal First Nations.)
- Shxw'ow'hamel First Nation (Shxw'ow'hamel Band, historic: Ohamil/Ohaunil Band, Shxw’ōwhámél/Shxw'ōwhámel people, part of the Tiyt (Tait) tribe or Upper Stó:lō tribe.)
- Soowahlie First Nation (Th'ewá:lí people, part of the Ts'elxwéyeqw (Chilliwack) tribe.)

=== Stó꞉lō bands with no tribal council ===
- Skwah First Nation (Skwah Band, Sqwa/Sqwehá people, part of the Pelóxwlh Mestiyexw (Pilalt/Pil’alt) tribe.)
- New Westminster Indian Band (Qayqayt First Nation, Qiqéyt (Qəqəyt) village people, originally a Kwantlen/Qʼʷa:n̓ƛʼən̓ village, the main village Sχəyəməɬ of the Kwantlen/Qʼʷa:n̓ƛʼən̓ people was on the opposite riverside in New Westminster, also descendants of the T'sic̓əl̕əs village of the Musqueam/Xʷməθkʷəy̓əma people, composite band made up of residents from many different Coastal First Nations.)
- Kwikwetlem First Nation (Coqutlam/Kwayhquitlum Indian Band, historic: Coquitlam Indian Band, pre-2000: Kwayhquitlam First Nation, Kʷikʷəƛ̓əm/Kwikwetl'em people, slaves/servants of the Kwantlen/Qʼʷa:n̓ƛʼən̓ people.)
- Union Bar First Nation (historic: Texas Lake/Tenas Lake Peoples, Iwówes/Aywawwis/Ewa-Woos people, part of the Tiyt (Tait) tribe or Upper Stó:lō tribe.)
- Peters First Nation (Peters Band, pre-1952: Squawtits, Skwaw-Tits/Squatits people, part of the Tiyt (Tait) tribe or Upper Stó:lō tribe.)
- Katzie First Nation (Katzie Nation, q̓ic̓əy̓/Q'éyts'iy village people.)
- Sts'ailes Nation (Chehalis First Nation or Stsailes First Nation, Sts'ailes/Sts'a'íles people.)
- Yale First Nation (Yale Indian Band, had close family ties to Lower Nlaka'pamux (Nłeʔkepmxc) bands and therefore speak also the "Puchil (Yale) dialect" of Nlaka'pamuctsin (Nłeʔkepmxcin), part of the Tiyt (Tait) tribe or Upper Stó:lō tribe.)

=== BC treaty negotiations ===
The Stó꞉lō Declaration included twenty-four First Nations when it was signed in 1977. Twenty-one of these nations entered the BC Treaty Process as the Sto꞉lo Nation Chiefs Council in August 1995. Four First Nations withdrew from the treaty process, leaving seventeen to reach Stage Four of the six-stage process.

In 2005, an internal reorganization of the nineteen Stó꞉lō First Nations divided them into two tribal councils. Eleven of these First Nations — Aitchelitz, Leq'a:mel, Matsqui, Popkum, Shxwhá:y Village, Skawahlook, Skowkale, Squiala, Sumas, Tzeachten, and Yakweakwioose — chose to remain in the Stó꞉lō Nation.

Eight others formed the Stó꞉lō Tribal Council. The eight members — Chawathil, Cheam, Kwantlen First Nation, Kwaw-kwaw-Apilt, Scowlitz, Seabird Island, Shxw'ow'hamel First Nation, and Soowahlie — are not participating in the treaty process.

== See also ==
- Brent Galloway
- Steven Point
- Louie Sam

== General and cited references ==
- Carlson, Keith Thor, ed. (2001). A Stó꞉lō-Coast Salish Historical Atlas. Douglas & McIntyre. ISBN 1-55054-812-3.
- Carlson, Keith Thor, ed. (1997). You Are Asked to Witness: The Stó꞉lō in Canada's Pacific Coast History. Chilliwack, BC: Stó꞉lō Heritage Trust. ISBN 0-9681577-0-X.
- Glavin, Terry (2002). Amongst God's Own: The Enduring Legacy of St. Mary's Mission. Mission BC: Mission Indian Friendship Centre.
- Wells, Oliver N. (1987). The Chilliwacks and Their Neighbors. Edited by Ralph Maud, Brent Galloway and Marie Wheeden. Vancouver: Talonbooks.
