= Hwlitsum First Nation =

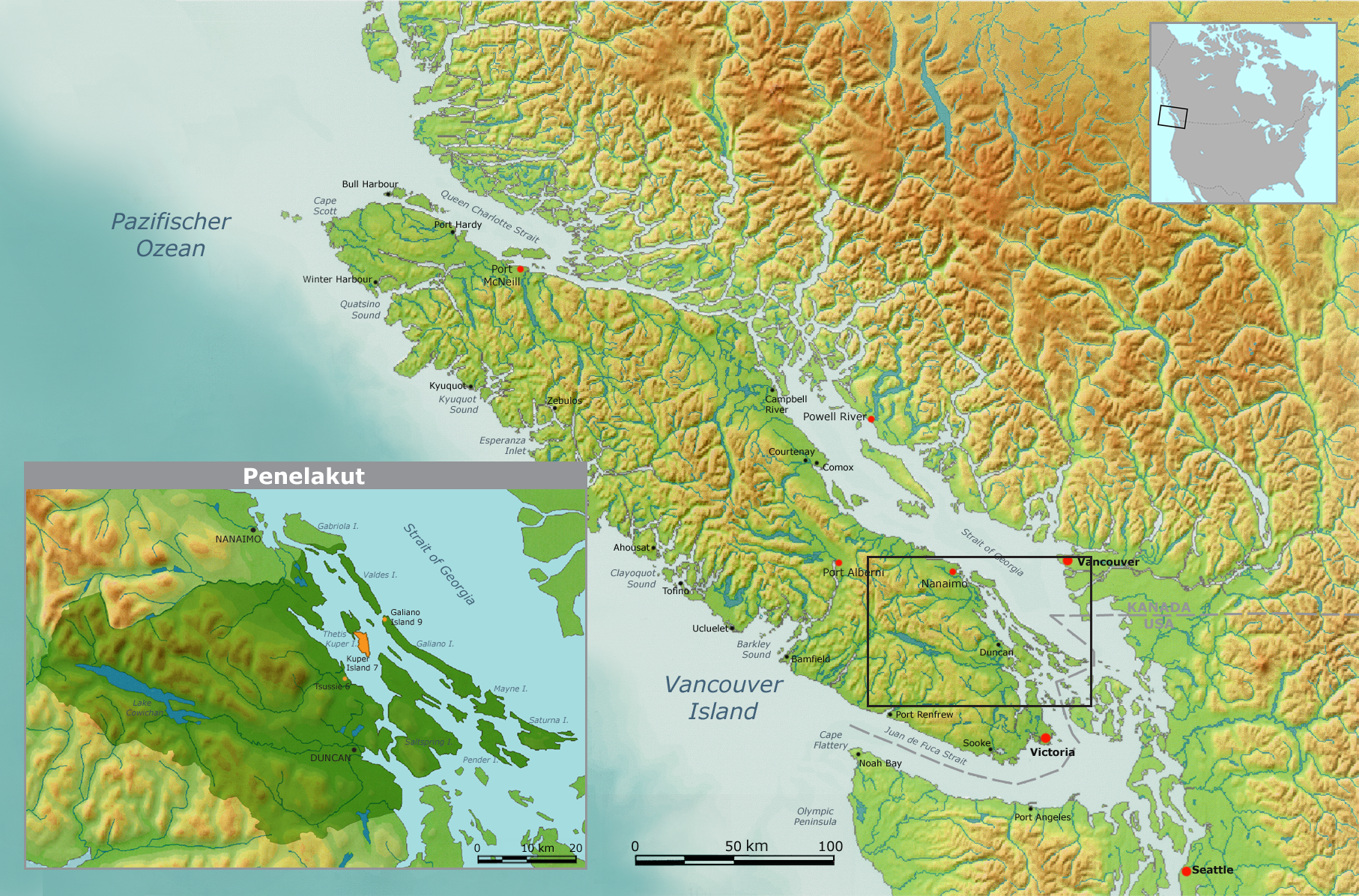
Penelakut Island, formerly Kuper Island and original home to the Lamalcha Peoples.

The Hwlitsum First Nation is an organization representing the group historically known as the Lamalchi or Lamalcha but properly called Hwlitsum. The Hwlitsum are the descendants of the Lamalchi people and changed their name to Hwlitsum when they moved to Hwlitsum (Canoe Pass, British Columbia) in 1892. Hul'qumi'num custom names groups based on the location of their winter village. Changing location of their winter village changed the name of the people. The Hwlitsum are a Hulquminum-speaking people whose home region is in the Southern Gulf Islands. The Hwlitsum were never granted reserves or band status and are currently seeking recognition as a band government from the governments of British Columbia and Canada.

The Hwlitsum are descendants of the Lamalchi (also called Lamalcha) peoples of Penelakut Island (formerly Kuper Island) in the Gulf Islands. Hwlitsum refers to Canoe Pass, near Steveston in Richmond, British Columbia and means “People of the Cattails”.

== Origin stories ==
- On Penelakut Island, two cedar logs lay on the shore. From these logs came the first man and woman on the island. These people became the ancestors of the Hul'qumi'num-speaking nations along with others who landed on mountains and hills on Vancouver Island or emerged from sands of Penelakut Island.
- Two Sqwxwa'mush families, Ah-Thult and Hola-Pult, built houses on an island. The houses were at different bays with a point of rock in-between them. Ah-Thult's family was unsuccessful hunting and sought the advice of Hola-Pult. Hola-Pult's family had great success hunting and suggested that perhaps Ah-Thult was not clean and pure enough to be visited by the hunting spirit. Ah-Thult left his family to go into the mountains until he was clean. While there he was visited by spirits who showed him how to be a successful hunter. Upon Ah-Thult's return Hola-Pult decided to steal this ability but Ah-Thult tricked him into leaving the Island. Hola-Pult and his men were lured to Penelakut Island and decided to relocate there. This became the home for the Lamalchi people who lived on the land until relocating to Hwlitsum (Canoe Pass).

== History ==
Hul'qumi'num custom identifies groups of people by the location of their winter village. The Lamalchi's winter home was on Penelakut Island at Lamalcha Bay. Prior to 2010 Penelakut Island was named Kuper Island. The Lamalchi shared Penelakut Island with the Penelakut and Yekaloas. The permanent summer villages of the Lamalchi were located in Hwlitsum (Canoe Pass). When the Lamalchi were prevented from returning to winter in Lamalcha Bay in 1892 they wintered in Hwlitsum and, in keeping with Hul'qumi'num custom, changed their name to Hwlitsum at that time.

The Hwlitsum Nation's ancestry can be traced back to the late 1790s. References and maps verify the Lamalchi living and working on Penelakut Island in the early eighteen-hundreds.

European explorers had only made brief, and superficial exploration into Hul'qumi'num territories by the early 1850s. At contact and when the British claimed sovereignty in 1846, the Lamalchi “were an autonomous social entity within the larger Coast Salish social network.” The Lamalchi had family ties and marriage connections to the Lummi Nation, Musqueam Nation, and Katzi Nation. and are part of the larger Cowichan community. The Lamalchi were one of the subtribes of the Cowichan people and had different histories and cultural practices from their ancestral neighbours on Penelakut Island. Penelakut Island was shared between the Penelakut, the Yekaloas and the Lamalchi who all maintained separate and individual villages.

The Lamalcha Nation was not recognized by the British when the international border between Canada and the United States was drawn in 1846. The Lamalchi were not identified by the British and United States authorities that settled the border dispute by agreeing to use the 49th parallel as the international border. This oversight left the Lamalchi in a position of not being accounted for in any treaty agreements. The Hwlitsum, descendants of the Lamalchi, are working with the Canadian government today to correct this omission in the written records.

Prior to and at the time of contact, the Lamalchi were involved in intertribal wars along the coast. Warriors would speak to an approaching canoe in Hul'qumi'num. If the occupants did not respond in Hul'qumi'num they were prevented from travelling in Hul'qumi'num waters.

The Lamalcha/Hwlitsum defended themselves against Royal Navy attack in the days of the Colony of Vancouver Island, and in the wake of that, their former territories were taken up by other peoples who did get reserves and status rights, which were denied to the Lamalcha (see the Lamalcha War section on the Hwlitsum article).

== Political organization ==
Their political organization, the Hwlitsum First Nation, is currently seeking legal recognition as a band government under the Indian Act, are in joint action with the Tsawwassen First Nation on mutual interests in the Fraser Estuary. They lobbied to have those interests included in the Tsawwassen Treaty negotiations but that treaty concluded without them being addressed.

A letter of support for their cause was sent to the federal and provincial governments in 2007 by the Union of BC Indian Chiefs. They have standing in the BC Treaty Process towards recognition but are still not a chartered band government.

== Language ==
The Hwlitsum, being descendants of the Lamalchi, are part of the Hul'qumi'num speaking community, and specifically use the Island dialect.

== Methods of travel ==
The Lamalchi travelled primarily by canoe. In September 1828, a European fur-trader counted 550 Cowichan canoes returning with fish along the Lower Fraser River.

== Traditional territory ==
Closely related groups of people occupied villages on Penelakut Island, Galiano Island, Valdez Island and the east coast of Vancouver Island. These groups identify themselves by the names of their winter villages such as Penelakut and Lamalcha among others. “Lamalcha and Penelakut families controlled access to certain lands and resources on both sides of Trincomali Channel from Sqthaqa'l to Kulman, including the north end of Salt Spring Island from stulan on the west side to Shiyahwt on the east, and all of Galiano Island.” The Lamalchi occupied “lands at Brunswick Point, Lamalcha Bay, portions of Salt Spring Island and Galiano Island, and elsewhere” to the exclusion of others. Up until contact in 1849 the Lamalchi usually spent November to March at Lamalcha Bay, and April to October at Hwlitsum (Canoe Pass). They also travelled to the Coquitlam River and Pitt River to harvest plants during the growing season.

== Food ==
The Lamalchi and Penelakut were the only people who regularly hunted sea-lions around the south end of the Georgia Strait. Fishing was a central and defining feature of the Lamalchi People. They fished at xegetinas (long beach) by Deas Island at the mouth of the Fraser River and shared the site with other Hul'qumi'num speaking communities.

During their stay at the winter camp, they harvested “chum salmon, winter springs, oysters, clams, cockles, mussels, crab, cod, rock-cod, halibut, sole, red snapper, prawns, shrimp, cuttlefish (occasionally), sea urchins, kelp, sea weed, octopus, squid, herring, dogfish, and perch from local waters and beaches.” They also hunted deer, elk, black bear, raccoon, mink, seals, otter and grouse. They gathered salal, ferns, cedar bark, alder, maple, and berries for medicines and food. They were able to store food by smoking or drying it and storing it in boxes or bentwood boxes and caches.

Spring, summer, and winter, food consisted of eulachon, spring salmon, coho salmon, sockeye salmon, steelhead, pink salmon, chum salmon, and sturgeon along with clams, crab, shrimp, halibut, ling cod, smelt, flounder, trout, and dogfish. They hunted “deer, mountain goat, black bear, muskrat, red fox, pheasant, mink, marten, ducks, geese, pigeon, widgeon, otter, seal, brant and snow geese.” Plants harvested were “cedar bark, cascara bark, devil's club, huckleberries, salmonberry, strawberry, salal, alder, maple, squasum berry, cattails, rhubarb, plums, crab apples, and wapato.”

== Population ==
In 1824 Francis Annance estimated the population to be approximately 1,000.

In 1827 George Barnston estimated the collective population of the three largest Cowichan villages as approximately 1,500 people. This figure includes Somenos, and Quamichan of the Cowichan River and the Penelakuts (and Lamalchi) of Penelakut Island. Barnston made this estimation from the deck of a ship while sailing past these communities.

In 1849 an HBC employee recorded 122 people living in Lamalchi Bay.

== Traditional houses ==
The Lamalchi traditionally lived in longhouses.
