= Larry Grant (elder) =

Musqueam and Chinese-Canadian elder

Elder Larry Grant
- sʔəyəɬəq 洪禮興
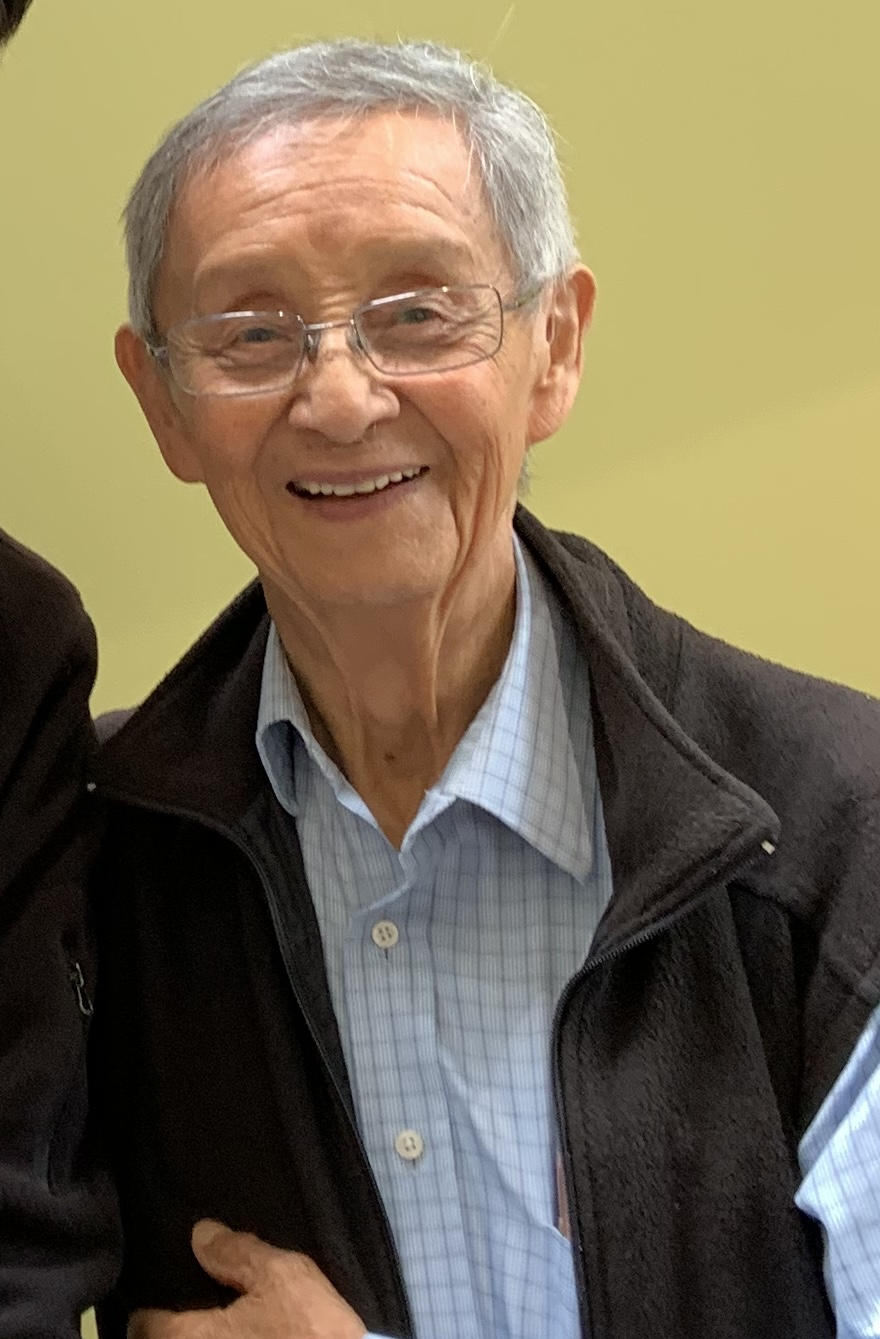
- Grant in 2023
- Born: September 1, 1936 (age 89); Agassiz, British Columbia, Canada
- Occupations: Educator, linguist, band councillor

Chinese name
- Traditional Chinese: 洪禮興
- Simplified Chinese: 洪礼兴
Transcriptions
Standard Mandarin
- Hanyu Pinyin: Hóng Lǐxìng
Yue: Cantonese
- Yale Romanization: hùhng láih hīng
- Jyutping: hung^{4} lai^{5} hing^{1}

Halkomelem name
- Halkomelem: sʔəyəɬəq

Elder Larry Grant (Halkomelem: sʔəyəɬəq; Chinese: 洪禮興) is a Musqueam and Chinese-Canadian elder, educator, adjunct professor, mechanic, longshoreman, and cultural consultant.

Grant serves as manager for the Musqueam language and culture department, and works towards revitalizing the hən̓q̓əmín̓əm̓ (Downriver Halkomelem) language. He serves as an adjunct professor for the University of British Columbia's First Nations and Endangered Languages Program. His work with hən̓q̓əmín̓əm̓ aided in providing dual-language names as well as new names to several locations in Vancouver.

== Early life ==
Grant was prematurely born September 1, 1936, to a Chinese father, Hong Tim Hing, and a Musqueam matriarch, Agnes Grant, on a hop field in Agassiz, British Columbia. Grant was the second of four children born to the couple, alongside Gordon Grant, Helen Callbreath and Howard E. Grant.

Hong Tim Hing was from Sei Moon, a village in Zhongshan, Guangdong Province. He immigrated in 1920 and was part of a group of Chinese migrants who had farmed on the Lin On Farm on Musqueam Reserve 2, one of 20 vegetable farms on the Musqueam reserve. The farm was owned by Agnes' father, Seymour Grant. Hong procured illegal documents which presented him as a relative of another settled Chinese worker, and was made to pay the Chinese head tax to enter the country. As a child, Grant seldom saw his father as a result of the provisions of the Indian Act, which had stipulated that non-Indigenous peoples were unable to cohabit on reserve lands. The Grant family was made to move from Musqueam to Vancouver's Chinatown as a result of the removal of Indian status due to Agnes' marriage to a non-Indigenous man. Grant was raised with help from his grandparents and the Musqueam community.

Grant was considered by the Canadian government as a Chinese citizen due to his ancestry, despite few connections with his father. Because of his Chinese ancestry, Grant was excluded from attendance within the Canadian Indian residential school system, and would instead attend public schools in Vancouver's neighborhood of Point Grey. Despite their mixed ancestry, the people of the Musqueam reserve treated the Grant children as fully Musqueam. Agnes Grant, according to her children, was one of the few remaining speakers of the hən̓q̓əmin̓əm̓ language, and passed on her oral history onto Grant. As a child, Grant would attend the potlatch and participate in games of slahal. As Grant's Indian status was not recognized, he was financially supported by his mother through his time in high school and three years of his apprenticeship. He would graduate from high school in 1955. Because of his family's financial situation, Grant was unable to attend university and instead worked towards becoming a tradesperson.

== Career ==
Grant worked as a heavy duty mechanic in the longshore industry and as an auto machinist for four decades prior to his retirement. Within Musqueam, Grant served as a band counselor from 1993 to 1998. He was then subsequently appointed to the Musqueam Fisheries Commission, where he served from 1999 to 2001. Following his retirement, Grant enrolled into the First Nations Language Program in the University of British Columbia and became an educator and an elder within the Musqueam community. Grant works as a language and culture consultant within the Musqueam community. Serving as the manager of the Musqueam language department, Grant has worked towards advancing Indigenous reconciliation and hən̓q̓əmin̓əm̓ language revitalization within the city of Vancouver. Grant is a Faculty Fellow at St. John's College, the inaugural Life Fellow for Green College.

During the 2010 Winter Olympics held in Vancouver, Grant aided in the formation of the cecəw stəlqayeʔ (Coastal Wolf Pack, Tsatsu Stalqayu) group of Coast Salish singers and dancers. In 2012, he was both a project lead and the participant of the Chinese Market Garden project, which archived the history of the Chinese market gardens on the Musqueam reserve.

Grant has led initiatives to rename various landmarks within the city. In 2022, Grant was consulted in the renaming of Vancouver's Trutch Street, named after Lieutenant Governor Joseph Trutch, to Musqueamview Street (Halkomelem: šxʷməθkʷəy̓əmasəm). Grant was additionally consulted in the renaming of Sir Matthew Begbie Elementary School, named after Matthew Baillie Begbie, to wək̓ʷan̓əs tə syaqʷəm.

=== Work within the University of British Columbia ===
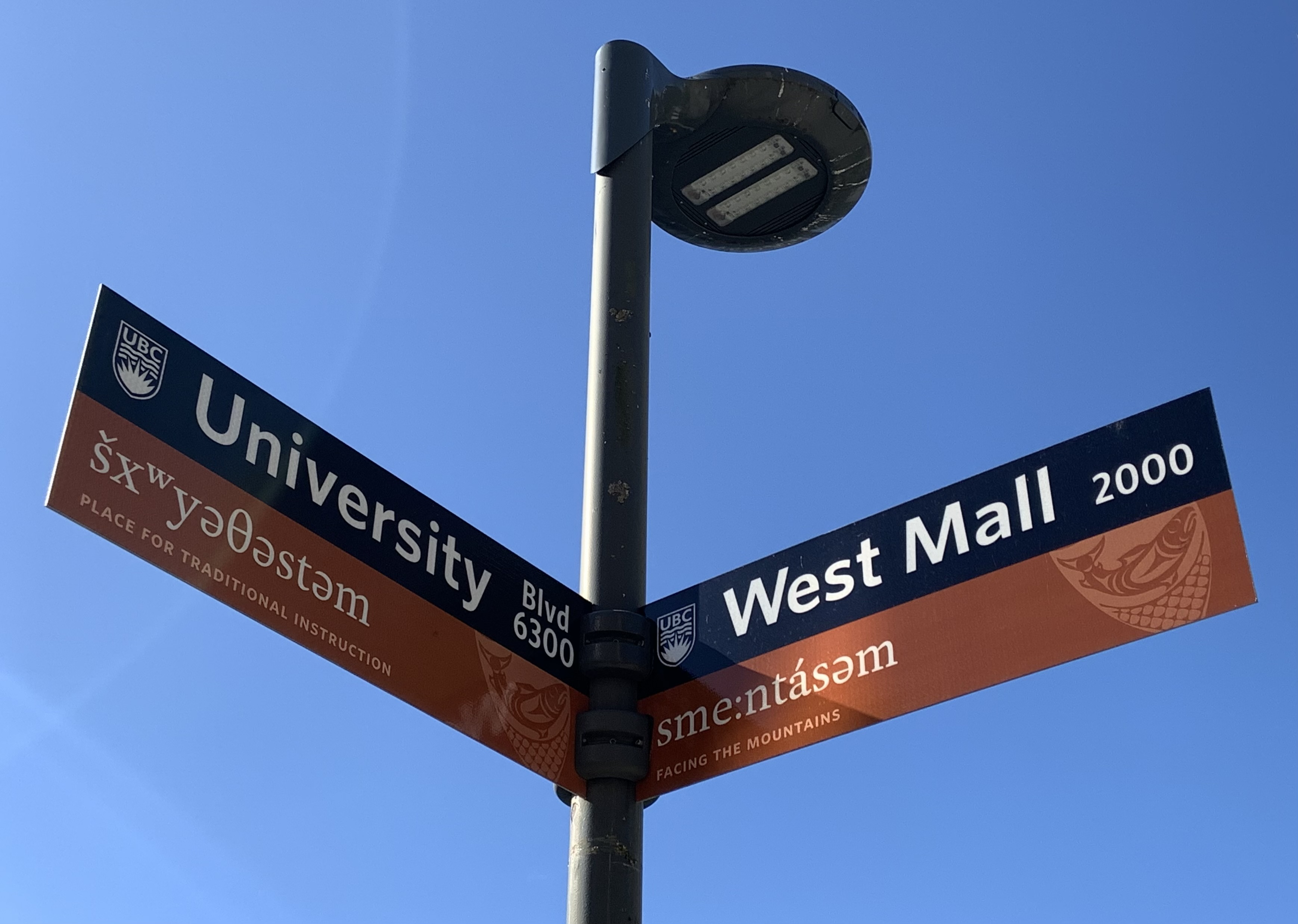
Grant provided hən̓q̓əmin̓əm̓ names to street signs at the University of British Columbia

Grant has served as the Elder-in-Residence for the University of British Columbia's First Nations House of Learning since 2001. In his duties as Elder-in-Residence, Grant serves as an ambassador for Musqueam, as well as an elder figure for Indigenous students looking for a home away from home. As of 2000, Grant serves as an adjunct professor within UBC's Institute of Critical Indigenous Studies' Musqueam Language and Culture Program, where he teaches courses on the hən̓q̓əmin̓əm̓ language.

Grant has served on the First Nations education standing committee, the UBC president's advisory committee on Aboriginal issues, and the Musqueam UBC Development committee.

Grant provided the names for a 2018 incorporation of hən̓q̓əmin̓əm̓ language names to street signs on the University of British Columbia grounds. Grant additionally provided the names of the tə šxʷhəleləm̓s tə k̓ʷaƛ̓kʷəʔaʔɬ residence area and the individual buildings təməs leləm̓ (Sea Otter House), sqimək̓ʷ leləm̓ (Octopus House), sɬewət̕ leləm̓ (Herring House), q̓əlɬaləməcən leləm̓ (Orca House) and qʷta:yθən leləm̓ (Sturgeon House). In 2011, as the lead representative for the Naming Advisory Committee for the Totem Park Infill Buildings, Grant provided Musqueam language names for two dormitory buildings. He was additionally involved in the naming of the Institute of Aboriginal health teaching and research garden at UBC Farm, as well as the Indigenous Studies Undergraduate Journal by the First Nations Studies Student Association.

== Personal life ==
Grant's great-great-great-grandfather was Chief Joe Capilano. He is a descendant of Musqueam warriors qiyəplenəxʷ (Capilano) and xʷəlciməltxʷ. Grant is married to Gina, an artist and residential school survivor. Gina's artwork includes Out of the Silence, which is displayed at the Vancouver International Airport.

In 2010 Grant received Vancouver Community College's Alumni Award of Distinction. In 2014, Grant became an honorary graduate of the University of British Columbia's Native Indian Teacher Education Program (NITEP).

=== In film ===
Grant was profiled as part of the Chinese Canadian Stories project by the University of British Columbia.

Grant's early life was profiled in the film All Our Father's Relations, which documented the Grant siblings retracing their father's journey from Guangdong to Musqueam, returning to their father's home community of Sei Moon, and highlighting the historical ties between Vancouver's Chinese Canadian community and the Musqueam. Grant was the subject of the 2007 documentary Writing the Land, produced by Kevin Lee Burton for the National Film Board of Canada, which documented his journey towards learning the hən̓q̓əmin̓əm̓ language.
