= Patricia Alice Shaw =

Canadian linguist (born 1946)

Pat Shaw
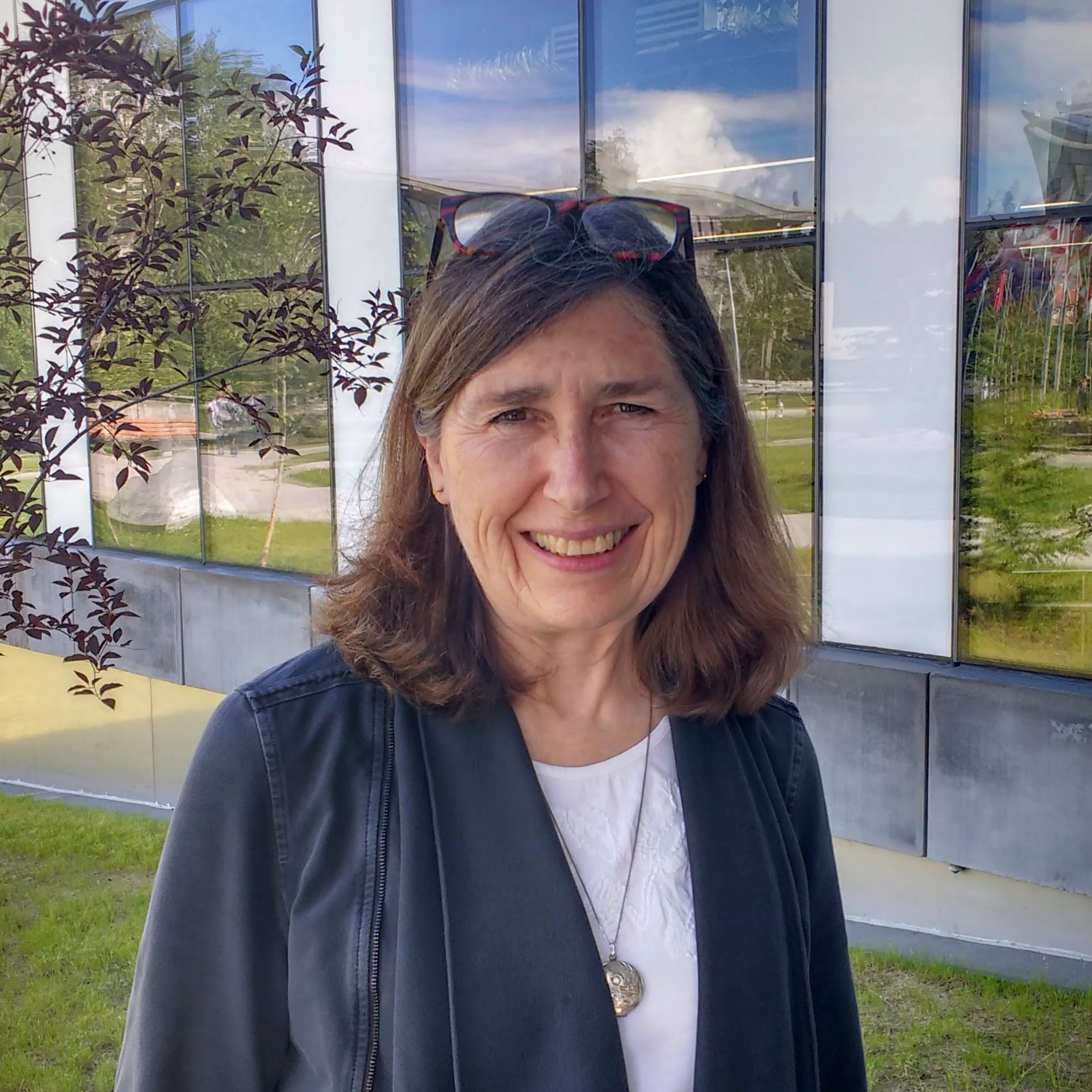
- Shaw in 2016
- Born: 1946 (age 78–79); Montreal, Quebec, Canada
- Scientific career
- Fields: Linguistics

Patricia Alice Shaw (born 1946) is a Canadian linguist specializing in phonology and known for her work on First Nations languages.

== Education and career ==
Patricia Shaw was born in Montreal and moved at the age of 12 to Winnipeg. She received her B.A. in English from St. John's College of the University of Manitoba in 1967, her M.A. in Linguistics from the University of Toronto in 1973, and her Ph.D. in Linguistics from the University of Toronto in 1976 with a dissertation on Theoretical Issues in Dakota Phonology and Morphology.

She taught at York University from 1976 until 1979 when she took up a position at the University of British Columbia. Since 30 June 2020 she is Professor emerita of Anthropological Linguistics in the Department of Anthropology at the University of British Columbia. She was Founding Chair of the university's First Nations and Endangered Languages Program (formerly known as the First Nations Languages Program).

A major focus of her work has been hən̓q̓əmin̓əm̓, the Musqueam dialect of Halkomelem, on which she has both done research and helped to create the joint Musqueam Indian Band-UBC First Nations Languages Program partnership.

== Honors and distinctions ==
- President of the Society for the Study of the Languages of the Americas (SSILA) from 2011-2013;
- Endangered Languages Steering Committee of the Canadian Linguistic Association,
- Committee on Endangered Languages and their Preservation (CELP); and has co-chaired several SSHRC Aboriginal Strategic Research Grant adjudication committees.
- Editor of the First Nations Languages Series at UBC Press;
- Taught at InField 2008 (UCSB), InField 2010 (U Oregon, Eugene), CoLang 2012 (U Kansas), CoLang 2014 (U Texas, Arlington)
- Faculty Mentor at the Breath of Life Archival Institute for Indigenous Languages in 2011, 2013 (Washington, DC), as well as the Breath of Life California Indian Language Restoration Workshop in 2012, 2014 (UC Berkeley).
- Board of Directors, Endangered Languages Fund

== Selected publications ==
Patricia A. Shaw. 1980. Theoretical Issues in Dakota Phonology and Morphology. Routledge. ISBN 978-0-429-46650-2

Kaisse, E., & Shaw, P. 1985. On the theory of Lexical Phonology. Phonology Yearbook, 2(1), 1-30. doi:10.1017/S0952675700000361

Patricia A. Shaw.1991. CONSONANT HARMONY SYSTEMS: THE SPECIAL STATUS OF CORONAL HARMONY. In: Carole Paradis, Jean-François Prunet (eds.), The Special Status of Coronals: Internal and External Evidence. Academic Press, Pages 125-157. ISBN 978-0-12-544966-3, doi:10.1016/B978-0-12-544966-3.50013-0

Patricia A. Shaw. 1993. Templatic evidence for the syllable nucleus. NELS 23, article 14. hdl:20.500.14394/36721

Shaw, Patricia A.. 2011. Non-adjacency in Reduplication. Studies on Reduplication, edited by Bernhard Hurch. Berlin, Boston: De Gruyter Mouton, pp. 161–210. doi:10.1515/9783110911466.161

Gordon, Matthew, Ghushchyan, Edita, McDonnell, Bradley, Rosenblum, Daisy and Shaw, Patricia A.. 2012. Sonority and central vowels: A cross-linguistic phonetic study. The Sonority Controversy, edited by Steve Parker. Berlin, Boston: De Gruyter Mouton, pp. 219–256. doi:10.1515/9783110261523.219
