= Muthkwey =

Unidentified flowering plant

məθkʷəy̓ (transliterated as muthkwey, malkway, mexwthi, or muthkwuy) is a legendary plant of uncertain identity which features in Musqueam oral histories. Anthropologist Wayne Suttles described it as "a plant no longer identifiable". In the Halkomelem language, it is described as a saχʷəl, a term which broadly means "plant".

== Tradition ==
According to Musqueam oral tradition, a two-headed serpent, sʔi:ɬqəy̓, transliterated as seelthkey, inhabited a small lake, xʷməm̓qʷe:m (Camosun Bog area), in Pacific Spirit Regional Park. Elders warned the youth of the community to avoid the bog, fearing they would be taken by the serpent. Tradition maintains that when it emerged from the bog and traversed the land, it would kill everything in its path. The two-headed serpent would leave behind droppings from which the məθkʷəy̓ would sprout. The path that the serpent traversed was said to have ultimately become Musqueam Creek, which passed through the Musqueam community, and stretched from Camosun Bog to the Fraser River. The Musqueam people considered the plant sacred as it had emerged from the serpent, and thus would refuse to harvest or walk over the plant. The plant was said to inhabit the tidal flats and Fraser River delta.

It was said that the məθkʷəy̓ plant's population fluctuated, at times being abundant and at other times being hardly found. The Musqueam people identified this trait with themselves, as their Musqueam community flourished at times, while at other times dwindled due to warfare or plague. One Musqueam story stated that the times of flourishing and dwindling for Musqueam people would be the same as those for the plant. The cycles of abundance that the plant underwent happened within a short period of time, according to the Charles family, a source of Musqueam oral tradition. It is said to have once grown abundantly throughout the Musqueam territory, but is now considered scarce and no longer grows within the territory. The Halkomelem name for Musqueam, xʷməθkʷəy̓əm, roughly translates to "the place where məθkʷəy̓ grows" or "place of məθkʷəy".

== Description ==
In the Halkomelem language, the məθkʷəy̓ plant was described as a saχʷəl, a term which broadly means "grass" or "plant", and was described as "unlike any other". Wayne Suttles noted that the "plant for which the village is named has been described variously," and called it "a plant no longer identifiable". The Charles family described the plant to Wayne Suttles as "grasslike, with an edible root" and noted that it no longer existed due to the presence of cattle which grazed on the plant. James Point described the plant as having thorns and small violet flowers, and said it had been eradicated due to burning and dyking in the area. Arnold Guerin, a native speaker, identified the plant as a "coarse grass". məθkʷəy̓ was originally transcribed into the English language as "grass". Later descriptions of məθkʷəy̓ identified it as another variety of flowering plant. As a result of the initial translation, the Musqueam people were referred to as the "People of the River Grass". It was later known by Vanessa Campbell and her team that saχʷəl denotes several varieties of plant, rather than referring only to grass.

=== Etymology ===
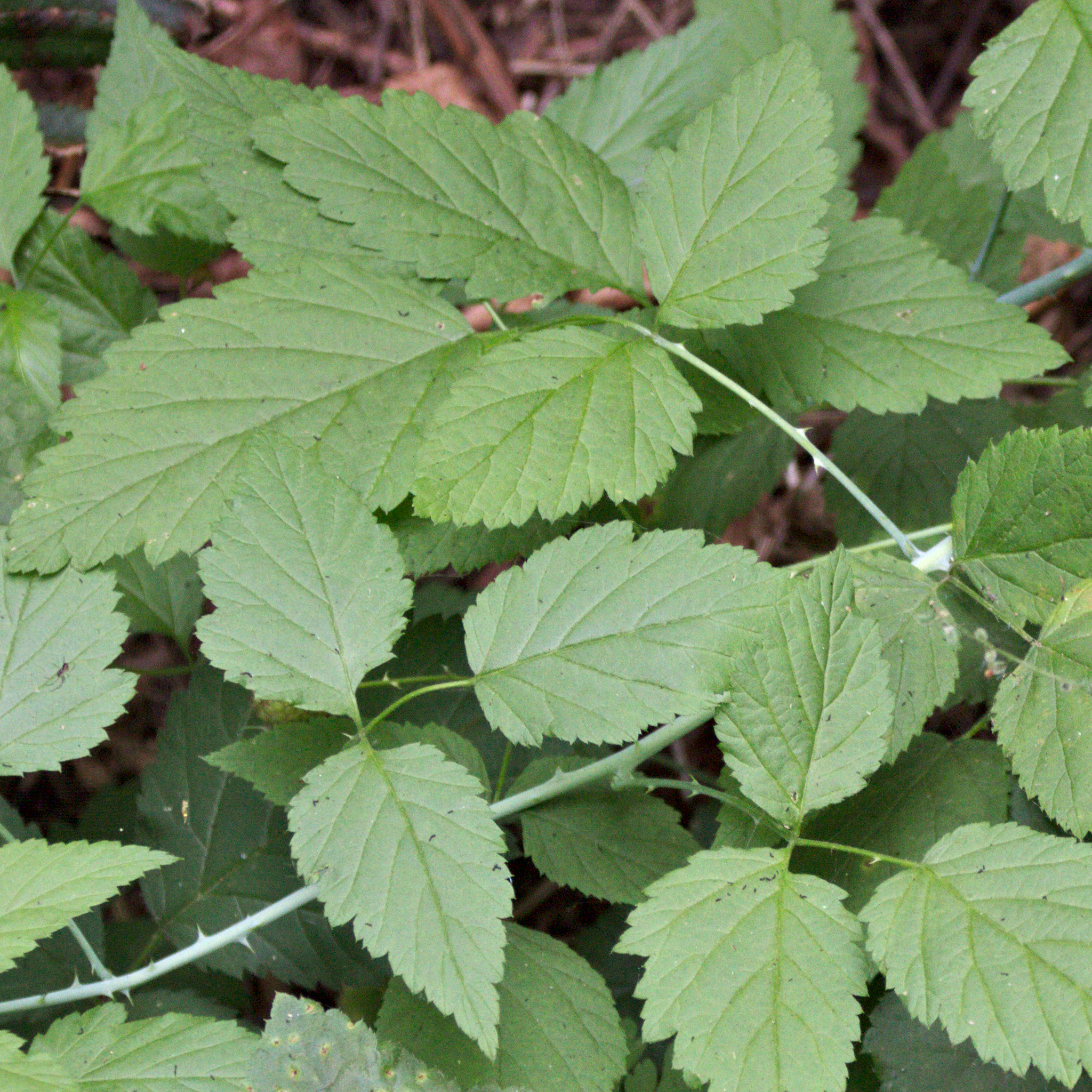
Kinkade (1986) noted the linguistic similarities between məθkʷəy̓ and the Proto-Salishan *məcə́kʷ (blackcap, Rubus leucodermis)

Kinkade (1986) notes his examination of the phrase məθkʷəy̓, and removal of the affix -m and -əy̓, resulting in mə̀θkʷ or mə̀t̓ᶿkʷ, which he identified with the Proto-Salishan word for "blackcaps": *məcə́kʷ. In consideration of the resulting change due to stress shift and regular changes, this form is noted to have reflexes from the Comox language to Tillamook language and from the Quinault language and Coeur d'Alene language. In the Lillooet language, Nuxalk language, and "all but two Central Salish languages", the term is replaced. In the Kwakʼwala language, it was borrowed into the lexicon. Thirteen languages keep the reflexes of məcə́kʷ, while nine languages replaced the term. Note the similar terms "mə́cəkʷ" in the Thompson, "məcúkʷ" in Shuswap, Spokane, and Coeur d'Alene, "mcákʷ" in Okanagan, and "mə́ckʷ" in Columbia-Moses.

The current term for blackcap raspberries in the Halkomelem language is cəlqáma, derived from the reconstructed root word *čəlq- of uncertain independent meaning. Additional languages that use the aforementioned root include Chilliwack, Nooksack, Lummi, and Lushootseed. The suffix -əy̓ denotes ‘plant, tree, wood’ according to Suttles (2004). For example: sə̀k̓ʷməy̓ "birch tree" is a combination of sák̓ʷm "whole bark" and the suffix -əy̓. The Halkomelem language name for Musqueam, xʷməθkʷəy̓əm, consists of the prefix xʷ- and suffix -əm, which is a typical structure for location names which incorporate plants or animals.

=== Botanical identity ===
At times it is referred to as "river grass", stemming from the original English translation. The book Musqueam: A Living Culture, a publication by the Musqueam First Nation, refers to it explicitly as a "grass". Wayne Suttles in the Musqueam Reference Grammar describes it as a "rush-like plant". Xwei’;ya Deanna Marie Point refers to the plant as "bullrushes" [sic]. Dale Kinkade identifies the plant as blackcap raspberry (Rubus leucodermis), citing the expected language shift from the Proto-Salishan root word *məcə́kʷ. He notes that the Musqueam do not associate the plant that is mentioned within the place name with the blackcap raspberry. In 2019, Vanessa Campbell, a Musqueam educator, was working alongside the University of British Columbia to determine the identity of the plant.

== See also ==
- Silphium
