= Brent Galloway =

American linguist (1944–2014)

- Born: April 8, 1944; Oakland, California, U.S.
- Died: August 6, 2014 (aged 70); Regina, Saskatchewan, Canada
- Education: University of California, Berkeley (B.A., C.Phil., Ph.D.)
- Occupations: Linguist; researcher
- Known for: Work with endangered Amerindian languages

Brent Douglas Galloway (8 April 1944 – 6 August 2014) was an American linguist noted for his work with endangered Amerindian languages, specializing in several of the Pacific Northwest and British Columbia. He completed his degrees through a doctorate in linguistics in 1977 at the University of California, Berkeley, undertaking extensive fieldwork in that period.

== Early life, education and career ==
Galloway was born in Oakland, California, and received his B.A., C.Phil., and Ph.D. in linguistics at the University of California, Berkeley, in 1965, 1971, and 1977, respectively. He conducted linguistic field work with the Haisla language, Upriver Halkomelem (from 1970), and Nooksack (from 1974).

In the case of Nooksack and Samish (see below), he worked with the last known surviving fluent speakers (since 2002 one person has become a fluent speaker of Nooksack, and there may be 3 or 4 descendants who speak Samish).

== Career ==
From 1975 and 1980 Galloway founded and headed the Halkomelem Language Program at the Coqualeetza Education Training Centre in Sardis, British Columbia. He developed the Stó:lō Halkomelem orthography, which was subsequently adopted officially and is now in wide use throughout the Fraser Valley. He also compiled the first grammar of Upriver Halkomelem, published in 1977, plus treatises on the region's ethnobotany and ethnozoology. According to Galloway, some words in Halkomelem "encapsulate the whole knowledge of the culture." The language has a rich oral literature which shows a whole way of looking at the universe that is different from that of English or other European languages.

From 1984, he worked on the Samish dialect of Northern Straits Salish. In 1988 Galloway joined the Saskatchewan Indian Federated College's Department of Indian Languages, Literatures, & Linguistics and served as its head from 1988 to 1994. He continued to work extensively with Halkomelem and Nooksack language education. In 1994 he also began to work on the Gullah language of the South Carolina and Georgia Low Country.

== Works ==
Galloway compiled elements of a dictionary for Samish, "A Phonology, Morphology, and Classified Word List for the Samish Dialect of Straits Salish (1990 National Museum of Civilization, Canadian Ethnology Service, Mercury Series Paper #116),

- (co-authored with Virginia Mixson Geraty), a dictionary for Gullah (c.1994) (She later independently published Gulluh Fuh Oonuh/Gullah for You: A Guide to the Gullah Language (English and Gullah Edition) (1998)
- Halkomelem: (co-authored with George Adams, a tribal elder and fluent speaker), "Grammatical Sketch and Classified Word List of Upriver Halkomelem" (1980, Coqualeetza Education Training Centre)
- "Classified Word List of the Nooksack Language", 2008
- Dictionary of Upriver Halkomelem (2009), University of California Press, Publications in Linguistics.
- Nooksack Place Names (2011, co-authored with Allan Richardson; University of British Columbia Press)

In addition, he published about 100 descriptive articles and papers on Halkomelem and Nooksack, and several on Assiniboine and Samish. As of October 2008 he was working to complete a Nooksack dictionary. His work on these languages was based on original field work and recorded tapes that have been copied to CDs.

Galloway also wrote a number of papers and articles on his theory of cognitive semantics, first called Three-Dimensional Semantics and now called Multi-Dimensional Semantics. He retired in August 2008 from First Nations University of Canada and was appointed professor emeritus there. He held that position until his death in Regina, Saskatchewan, six years later.

Dr. Galloway was also a composer of classical music (since 1956, mainly piano pieces, then synthesizer and orchestrated pieces). His orchestral pieces The Night Before Christmas and Mexican Colors have been performed by the Regina Symphony Orchestra.
