= Hwlitsum =

Indigenous people of Gulf Islands, British Columbia

The Hwlitsum are descendants of the Lamalchi or Lamalcha, an Indigenous people whose traditional territories were in the Gulf Islands of British Columbia, Canada. Their traditional villages were on Canoe Pass, which is known in their language as Hwlitsum, and on Kuper Island (called by them Lamalchi, another spelling of their name,) Saltspring Island and Galiano Island.

== The Lamalcha War ==
On 20 April 1863, a shelling of their village on Kuper Island by the Royal Navy's HMS Forward led to a series of events known as the Lamalcha War or Lamalchi Affair. The reason for the shelling was the authorities of the Colony of Vancouver Island believed the village was sheltering men suspected of murdering three white men. After a prolonged firefight, resulting in the killing of one British sailor, the Forward retreated. While some say this episode was the only tactical defeat of the Royal Navy in the era following the Crimean War to the opening of the 20th Century, the Forward returned the next day to destroy the then-abandoned village. During the war the escaped Lamalcha evaded capture by various other Royal Navy warships, including HMS Satellite, until the seven suspects were captured and brought to Esquimalt.

Eventually four Lamalcha were hanged for murder in Victoria and the Lamalcha village confiscated; that area is now home to the Penelakut and Kuper Island's Indian reserves are governed by the Penelakut First Nation.

A detailed account of the events leading to the Lamalcha War is provided by Chris Arnett in "Terror of the Coast - Land Alienation and on Vancouver Island and the Gulf Islands 1849 -1863.”

== Political organization ==
=== Contemporary landclaim ===
In 2014 elders of the group filed a land claim in the BC Supreme Courts for large pieces of Stanley Park, Galiano Island and Saltspring Island, overlapping with claims of the Squamish and Musqueam Nations and others (this is common throughout BC). Currently the Hwlitsum Band is not yet recognized under the federal Indian Act.

A letter of support for their cause was sent to the federal and provincial governments in 2007 by the Union of BC Indian Chiefs.
