= Donna Gerdts =

American linguist (fl. 21st century)

Donna B. Gerdts (Halkomelem: Sp’aqw’um’ultunaat) is professor of linguistics and associate director of the First Nations Languages Program at Simon Fraser University. She is a syntactician who has worked most extensively on Halkomelem and Korean. She has created extensive teaching materials for Halkomelem, and is currently engaged in further research on the language, funded by the Social Sciences and Humanities Research Council of Canada. Some of her key areas of interest are: syntactic theory, language typology and universals, the syntax/morphology interface, and the form and function of grammatical categories.

Gerdts earned her Phd in Linguistics from the University of California at San Diego. Gerdts was editor of International Journal of American Linguistics from 2014 to 2019. She was a founding co-editor of the Northwest Journal of Linguistics, and currently serves on its editorial board. She also worked as an associate editor of Language, a journal produced by the Linguistic Society of America.

In 2008, Gerdts was president of the Society for the Study of the Indigenous Languages of the Americas.

== Research and Works ==
Gerdts has researched and written extensively on Halkomelem and Korean, and proposed syntactic theory "Mapping Theory," an offshoot of Relational Grammar. She has also created substantive educational materials on Halkomelem, including a talking dictionary and school materials for students and teachers in the First Nations Representatives and Nanaimo School District No. 68.

=== Mapping Theory ===
Gerdts proposed Mapping Theory in 1992 as an offshoot of Relational Grammar that takes into account the association between grammatical relations and morphosyntactic argument structure. There are no levels between grammatical relations and the argument structure, and instead of using a universal inventory of grammatical relations, Mapping Theory posits "morphosyntactically-licensed argument positions," or MAPs.

==== Mapping Halkomelem Grammatical Relations (1993) ====
In this article, Gerdts gives a relational profile for Halkomelem. She starts by arguing that the relational profile of a language is related to its morphosyntactic argument structure and uses this as a starting point for Mapping Theory. She defines relational profile as an account of the systematic constructions in a language's grammar, emphasizing that grammatical constructions are not random. A relational profile for Halkomelem would be that it is a direct object-centered language, because "rules of the grammar pivot on the concept object, while the concept indirect object seems to be irrelevant."

==== Mapping Korean Grammatical Relations (1993) ====
In this article, Gerdts provides an outline of Korean grammar based in Mapping Theory, and concludes that Korean is a 2-MAP language, despite the fact that it displays characteristics of languages that allow more MAPs.

=== Additional Works ===
- Gerdts, Donna B. (1987). "Surface Case and Grammatical Relations in Korean: The Evidence from Quantifier Float". Studies in Language. 11 (1): 181–197. doi:10.1075/sl.11.1.08ger.
- Gerdts, Donna B. (1988). Object and Absolutive in Halkomelem Salish. London: Routledge. ISBN 9781317918080.
- Gerdts, Donna B.; Michelson, Karin, eds. (1989). Theoretical Perspectives on Native American Languages. Albany: State University of New York Press. ISBN 9780887066436.
- Gerdts, Donna B.; Marlett, Stephen A. (October 2008). "Introduction: The Form and Function of Denominal Verb Constructions". International Journal of American Linguistics. 74 (4): 409–422. doi:10.1086/595571. JSTOR 10.1086/595571. S2CID 143978309.
- Gerdts, Donna B.; Hukari, Thomas E. (October 2008). "Halkomelem Denominal Verb Constructions". International Journal of American Linguistics. 74 (4): 489–510. doi:10.1086/595575. JSTOR 10.1086/595575. S2CID 145756089.
- Gerdts, Donna B. (October 2017). "Indigenous linguists: bringing research into language revitalization". International Journal of American Linguistics. 83 (4): 607–617. doi:10.1086/693763. S2CID 149081645.

== Teaching ==
Gerdts teaches classes on languages of the First Nations, which are indigenous languages of southern Canada. More specifically, she teaches courses on narrative and discourse structure, morphology and syntax, and socio-cultural and cognitive aspects of First Nation Languages. She also teaches more general linguistics courses, on field methods and description analysis.

Graduate students who she taught have contributed to linguistic literature through their theses in a variety of languages, including but not limited to: Arabic, ASL, Azeri, Breton, Hausa, Kashmiri, Koine Greek, Korean, Kunuz Nubian, Okanagan, and Shuswap.
