= First Nations and Endangered Languages Program =

The First Nations Endangered and Endangered Languages Program (FNEL, formerly known as the First Nations Languages Program, FNLG) was initiated in 1996 as part of University of British Columbia's ongoing commitment to community-based collaboration with First Nations peoples, in recognition of the profound importance of First Nations languages, and the rich cultural traditions they represent. FNEL and UBC’s Vancouver Campus is located on the traditional, ancestral, and unceded territory of the hən̓q̓əmin̓əm̓-speaking Musqueam people.

== History ==
In 1997, a partnership was initiated between the First Nations Languages Program and the Musqueam Indian Band to promote the development and use of hən̓q̓əmin̓əm̓, Musqueam’s traditional language, through collaborative research initiatives.

== Program ==
Students can pursue a Major or Minor in FNEL. The program regularly offers university-level language courses in hən̓q̓əmin̓əm̓ at beginner, intermediate, and advanced levels. FNEL students have benefited from various other First Nations languages, including Cree (Plains Algonquian) Kwak̓wala (Northern Wakashan), Nɬe’kepmxcin (Northern Interior Salish), Dakelh Dene (Carrier Athapaskan), Dene Zāge’ (Kaska Athabaskan) and Nuu-chah-nulth (Southern Wakashan). FNEL methodology courses explore the processes and protocols for the documentation, conservation, revitalization, and reclamation of endangered languages, cultures, and Indigenous knowledge systems locally, regionally and internationally.

The First Nations Unicode Font was developed by the UBC FNEL Program under the auspices of a UBC Teaching and Learning Enhancement Fund (TLEF), and is accessible to anyone with the aim of promoting documentation and literacy in First Nations languages.
