= Penelakut =

First Nation in British Columbia

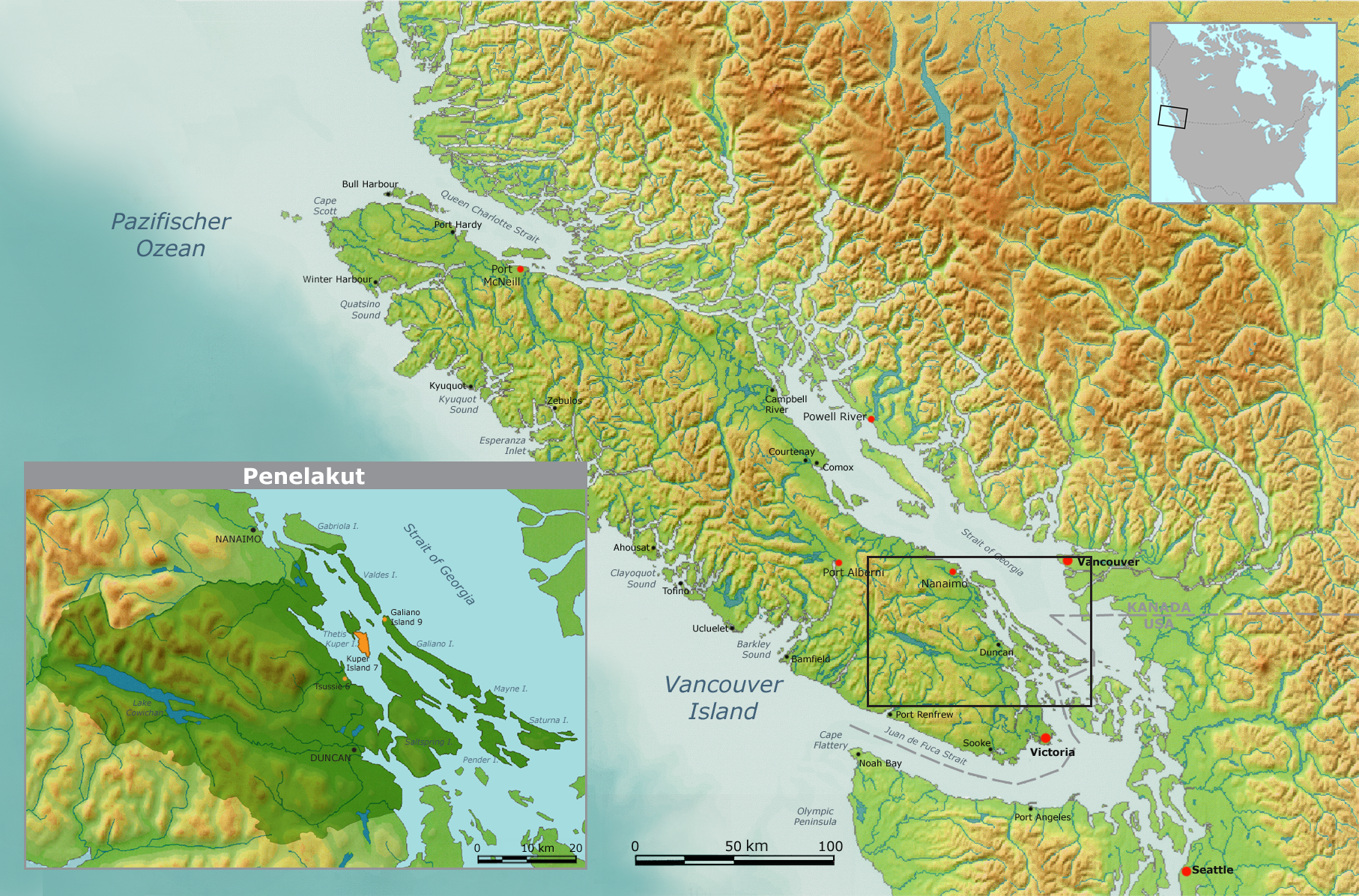
- Location of traditional Penelakut tribal territory

Total population
- 1,304 (2026)

Regions with significant populations
- Gulf island of British Columbia

Languages
- Halkomelem language

Religion
- Indigenous religion

Related ethnic groups
- other Coast Salish peoples

The Penelakut are a Hul'qumi'num-speaking First Nation located in the gulf islands of British Columbia, Canada. They number about 1,304 in 2026 and primarily live on Penelakut Island (formerly Kuper Island) near the south end of Vancouver Island, and Galiano Island. Their land stretches to Tent Island, which is private and currently uninhabited.

The Penelakut people are enrolled in the Penelakut Tribe.

== Name ==
The name Penelakut comes from penálaxeth', the village on the northeast end of Penelakut Island, once the largest Hul'qumi'num-speaking village in the Gulf Islands. Penálaxeth' means "log buried on the beach", which may refer to the many longhouses that were once on the beach near there.

== Territory ==
The Penelakut's territory is in the gulf islands of British Columbia, with the majority living on Penelakut Island.

== Lanuage ==
The Hul'qumi'num language is a Central Salish language. As of 2016, 40 of 555 Penelakut people spoke their Indigenous languages.
