= Virginia Mixson Geraty =

Virginia Mixson Geraty (1915–2004) was an American writer, librarian, and outspoken defender of the Gullah language. She authored poetry and books in the Gullah language and produced popular recordings in Gullah. She was also involved in theater and film productions that promoted popular understanding of the language.

== Biography ==
A Euro-American woman, Geraty spent some of her childhood years on Yonges Island, South Carolina. She learned Gullah from a family servant named "Maum Chrish," and she attributed her love of Gullah speech to those early interactions. Geraty worked for many years as a librarian in the Charleston County School System. Noticing that white teachers could not understand the speech of Gullah-speaking children, she spoke out in favor of language training for the teachers, but for many years her views were regarded as eccentric at best.

Geraty later produced a popular long-playing record with amusing anecdotes in Gullah. She wrote a Gullah-English dictionary, a Gullah cookbook, and a Gullah adaptation of the children's book The Night Before Christmas. She also wrote the script and served as the dialect coach for the award-winning film Gullah Tales in which the characters speak entirely in Gullah, and she served as a consultant to the BBC production The Story of English. Geraty translated the libretto of Porgy & Bess into Gullah and produced her version of the famous opera for audiences in Charleston. She also wrote a Christmas book dedicated to her Great grand children Luke and Anna.

Geraty was still active in her work to promote Gullah until shortly before her death at the age of 89. Even in advanced age, she was still controversial, sometimes telling Gullah young people that their Gullah speech was not correct because it was different from the old-fashioned Gullah she learned as a child. But Geraty had many warm friendships in the Gullah community, and in her later years, she often expressed joy at hearing Gullah spoken by small children. She devoted her life to preserving the language that she had learned as a child, and to gaining respect for it in the wider world.

== Awards ==
In 1995, Geraty received an honorary Doctorate of Humane Letters from the College of Charleston in recognition of her efforts to preserve the Gullah language. In 1998, she received the South Carolina Governor's Award in the Humanities. Her other honors include the Pegasus Award from the South Carolina Poetry Society and the Outstanding Accomplishment Award from the National League of American Penwomen.
