= Alpen Club =

Ethnic Cultural Organization

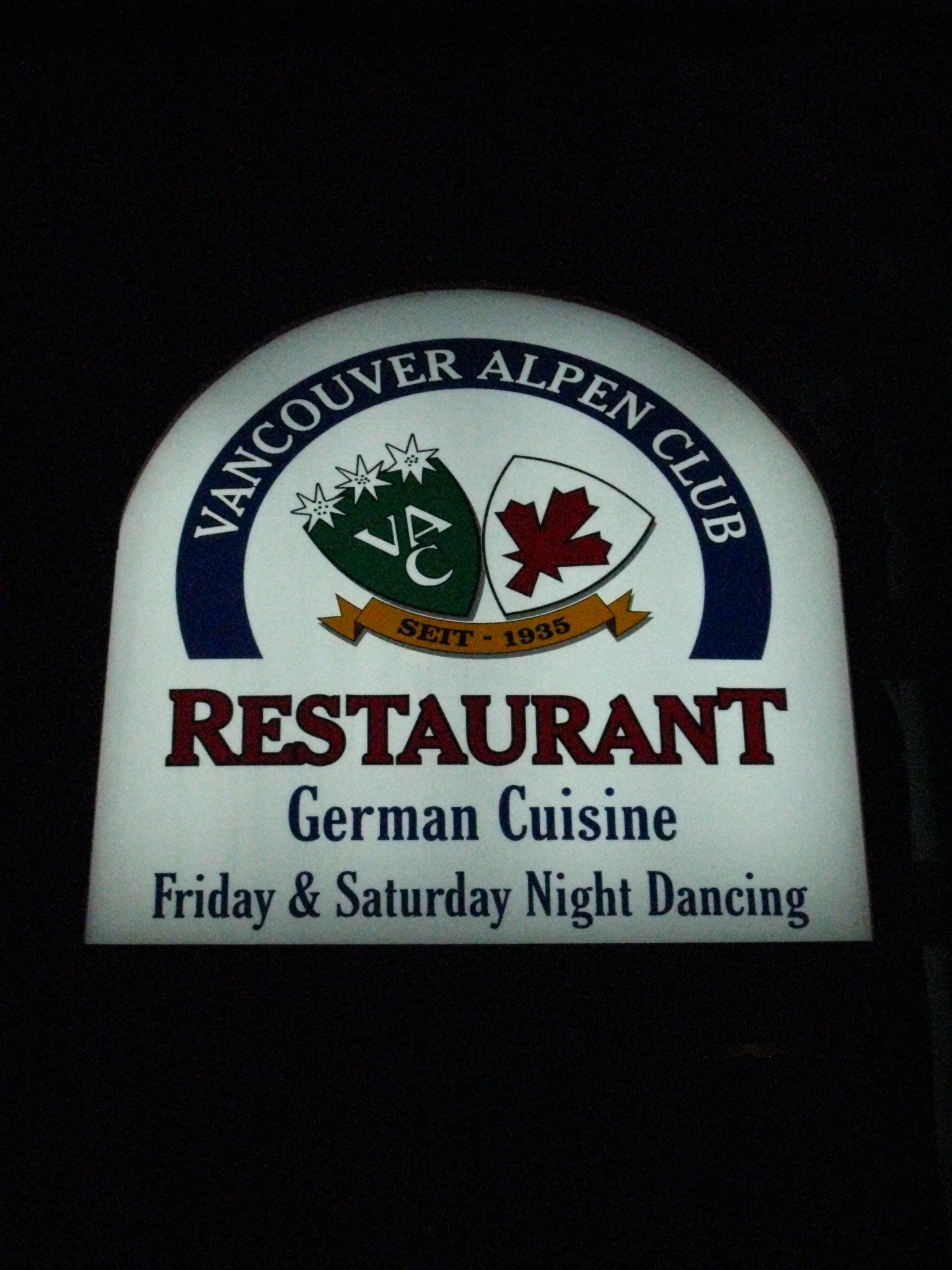
Alpen Club sign

The Vancouver Alpen Club is an ethnic cultural organization for German Canadians in Vancouver, British Columbia, Canada. Its headquarters, community hall and social centre are on Victoria Drive and 33rd Avenue, near Kingsway in East Vancouver.

== History ==
The Vancouver Alpen Club was founded by Bavarian immigrant Sebastian Schmidt and other German and Austrian immigrants in 1935, though it did not receive its provincial charter until 1938. The purpose of the club was to preserve the German language and culture, while being non-political. It "owed its early success to the Schuhplattler, a German folk dance which originated in the Bavarian and Tyrolean Alps, thus giving the name Alpen Club to the organization." The club's focus on dance, rather than politics was reflected in its original slogan, "Get away from politics and let's schuhplattle."

Originally, the club met at a house rented by Schmidt on the corner of Robson and Cambie. The organization outgrew the location, and meetings were held at Homer Hall, Winter Garden, English Bay pier, and Hamilton Hall at the corner of Hamilton and Dunsmuir.

Club activities included: folk dancing, concerts, a choir, German language instruction, calisthenics classes, and food and beverage service. In 1936, the club's Schuhplattler dance group won the trophy for best folk dance at the Canadian Folk Festival in Vancouver.

=== The World War II Period ===
The Vancouver Alpen Club was the only German club in North America to stay open during World War II. "This was largely influenced by the Canadian Folk Society who urged members to keep on with their Schuhplattler, and also to the fact they had never been tinged with political influences." During the War, the club's "liquor permit was cancelled, the dances stopped, and all non-naturalized Germans were evacuated from the coastal areas. In 1940 the German language classes ended and in 1941 the shutters were pulled down in the [Hamilton] hall." In January 1945, club members formed a building committee and began fundraising for their own hall.

==== The Post-War Period ====
By the end of 1946, the club was able to purchase the property at Victoria Drive and 33rd Avenue. "Eventually, this property was added to until Club holdings consisted of eight lots." The building was officially opened on October 19, 1950.

The club's membership increased steadily during the post-war period, as there was an influx of German-speaking immigrants to the Vancouver Lower Mainland. During the 1950s, the club produced stage productions, supported soccer teams in the Mainland League, and maintained its choir.

== The Current Vancouver Alpen Club ==
The Vancouver Alpen Club's restaurant, Deutsches Haus, serves German cuisine and beers. Sub-groups within the club include the Alpen Plattlers, a Schuhplatter dance group, choirs and card players.
