= Penelakut Island =

Island in the southern Gulf Islands of British Columbia, Canada

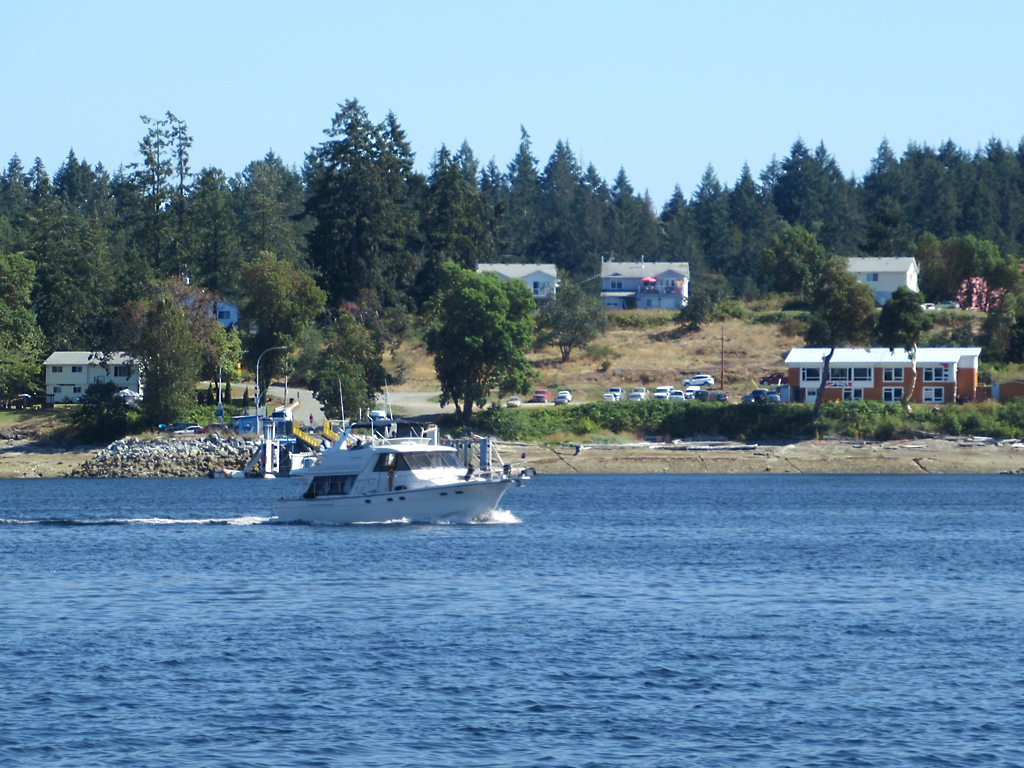

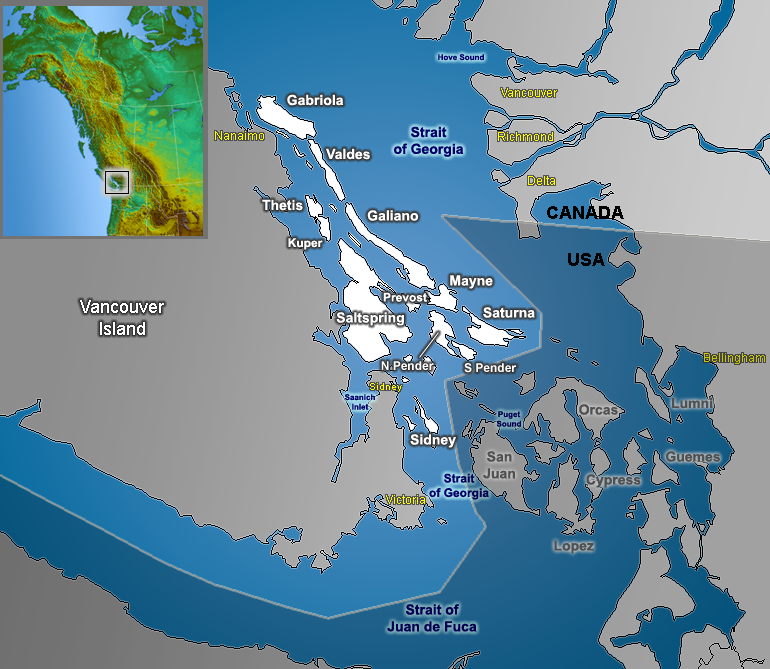
- Location of Penelakut Island in the Gulf Islands (labelled as Kuper Island)

- Location within Vancouver Island Location within British Columbia
- Coordinates: 48.96°N 123.645°W
- Country: Canada
- Province: British Columbia
- Regional district: Cowichan Valley Regional District

Government
  - MLA: Doug Routley (NDP)

Area
  - Total: 8.66 km^{2} (3.34 sq mi)

Population
  - Total: 302
- Time zone: UTC−8 (PST)
  - Summer (DST): UTC−7 (PDT)
- Postal code: V0R 5K0

Penelakut Island (called Kuper Island by most people between 1851–2010) is located in the southern Gulf Islands between Vancouver Island and the mainland Pacific coast of British Columbia, Canada. The island has a population of about 300 members of the Penelakut Band. The island has an area of 8.66 square kilometres (3.34 sq mi). There is frequent car and passenger ferry service to Penelakut from Chemainus on Vancouver Island. On its west side sits Telegraph Harbour.

A Mediterranean climate of mild winters and warm, dry summers supports a unique ecosystem and an ideal living environment. The island is in the rain shadow of Vancouver Island, with an annual rainfall of about 850 millimetres (33 in). Unlike most neighbouring Gulf Islands, the topography is subdued with few bluffs or rock outcrops. Poorly drained soils are common.

== History ==
Britain's Royal Navy, surveying the area in 1851, cruised into a group of five islands in the Strait of Georgia, declaring the colonial name of the two largest islands to be Kuper and Thetis, after their Captain Augustus Kuper R.N. (1809–1885) and his frigate, HMS Thetis, a 36-gun Royal Navy frigate on the Pacific Station between 1851 and 1853.

In 1861 about 300 Bella Bella Indigenous people in 19 large canoes were ordered away from Victoria by Governor James Douglas. On their return journey north, they staged a surprise attack at dawn on the Penelahut natives of Kuper Island, a tribe of about 400 in number. About 225 Penelahuts were murdered in one of the worse massacres recorded. A Nanaimo chief named Winni-win-chin was visiting Kuper Island. He escaped to Nanaimo and reported the massacre to Mr. A.G. Horne, in charge of the Hudson's Bay Company post. Mr. Horne dispatched canoe men to Victoria to report the act.

On April 20, 1863, the British gunboat HMS Forward attacked the native village on Kuper Island. The captain believed that the village harboured individuals of the separate Lamalchi tribe involved in two recent assaults in the Gulf Islands in which three Europeans had been killed in combat. HMS Forward used her guns to level the village; she then transported her captives to Victoria where they were tried and hanged.

From 1890 to 1978, the Catholic Church operated a residential school on the island. The present comprehensive school is run by the Penelakut. There is still much bitterness in the community over the violence and sexual abuse suffered by Indigenous children who attended the school. In 2002, Glenn Doughty, a Catholic Oblate brother who was employed at the school was sentenced to three years in prison for his historical crimes at the Kuper Island School, including indecent assault on a male, gross indecency, and one count of buggery involving 11 different victims. Those were the laws on the books when the crimes occurred in the 1960s and 1970s, and former attendees say the abusive practices were widespread. In July 2021, an announcement was made that 160 unmarked graves were identified near the site of the residential school.

== Gallery ==
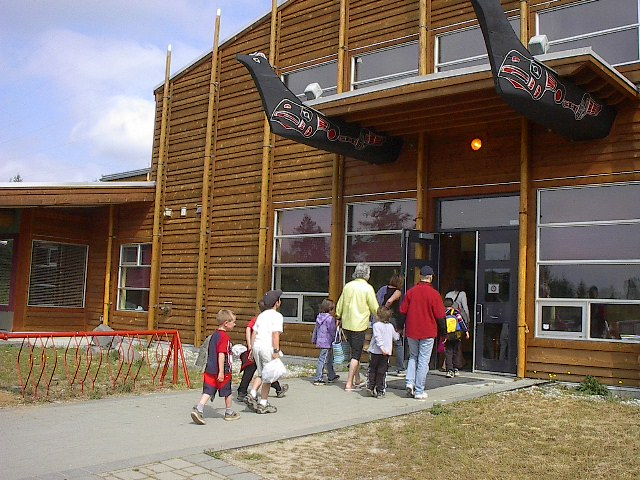
Kuper Island School

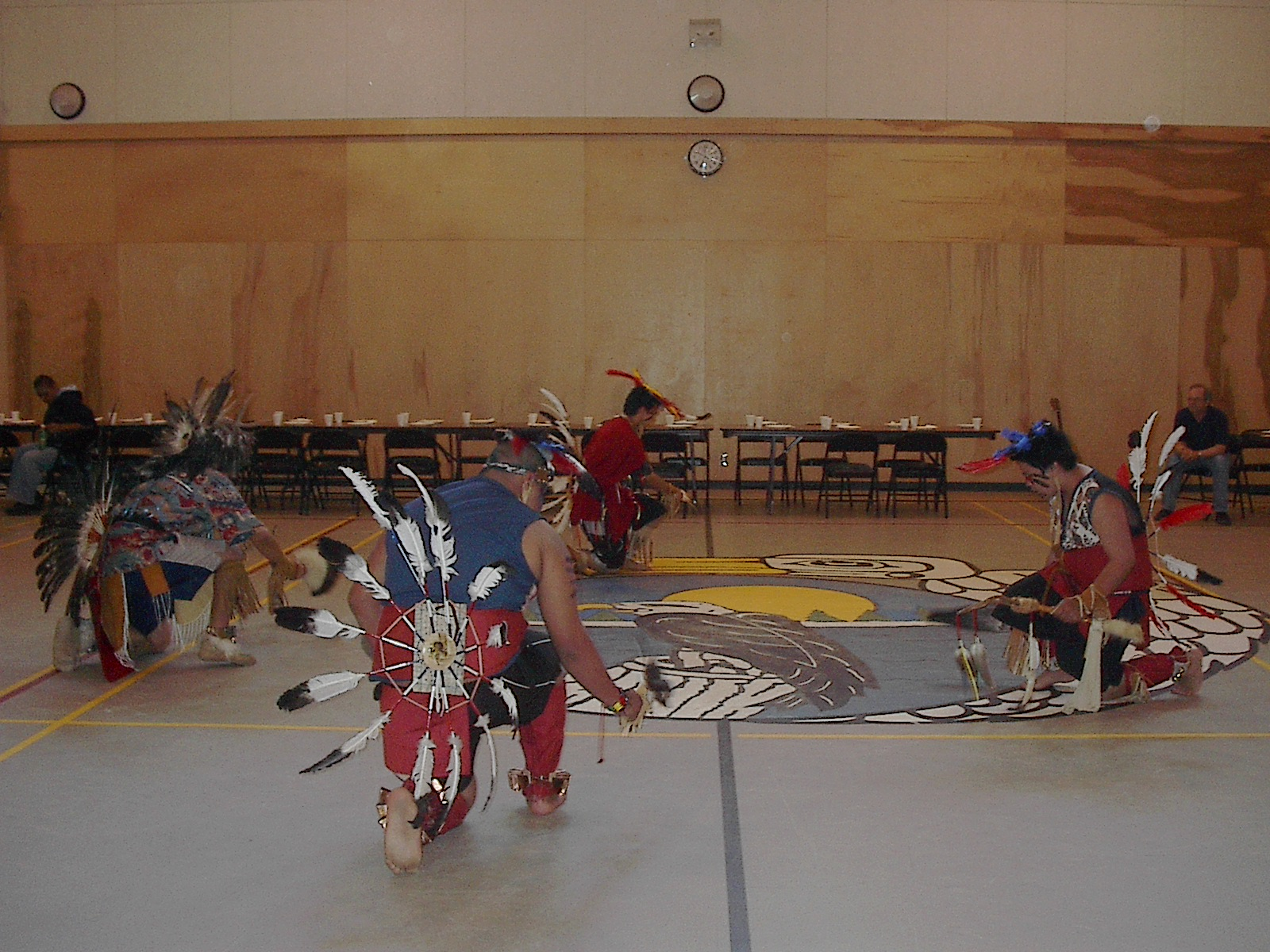
Ceremonial Dance, Kuper School Gymnasium

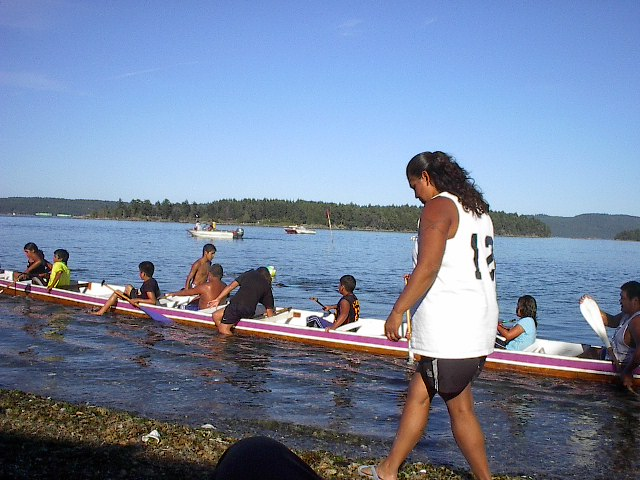
Ceremonial Canoe Races, 2006, Penelakut

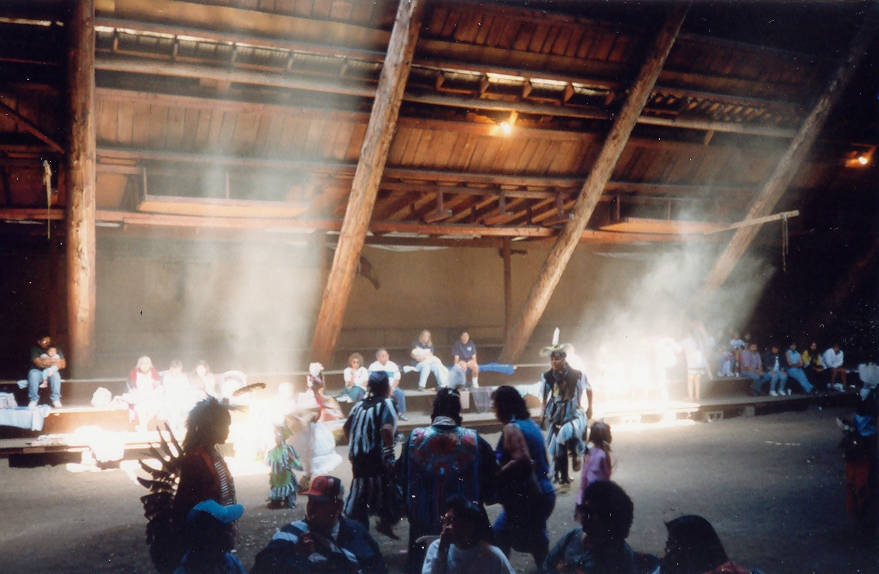
Penelakut Longhouse

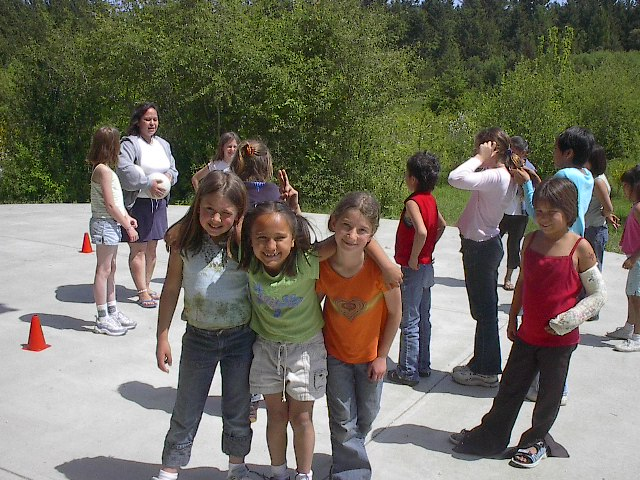
New Friends-Galiano Students visit Penelakut Band School, Penelakut
