= Halkomelem =

Salishan language

- Halq̓eméylem / Hul̓q̓umín̓um̓ / hən̓q̓əmin̓əm̓
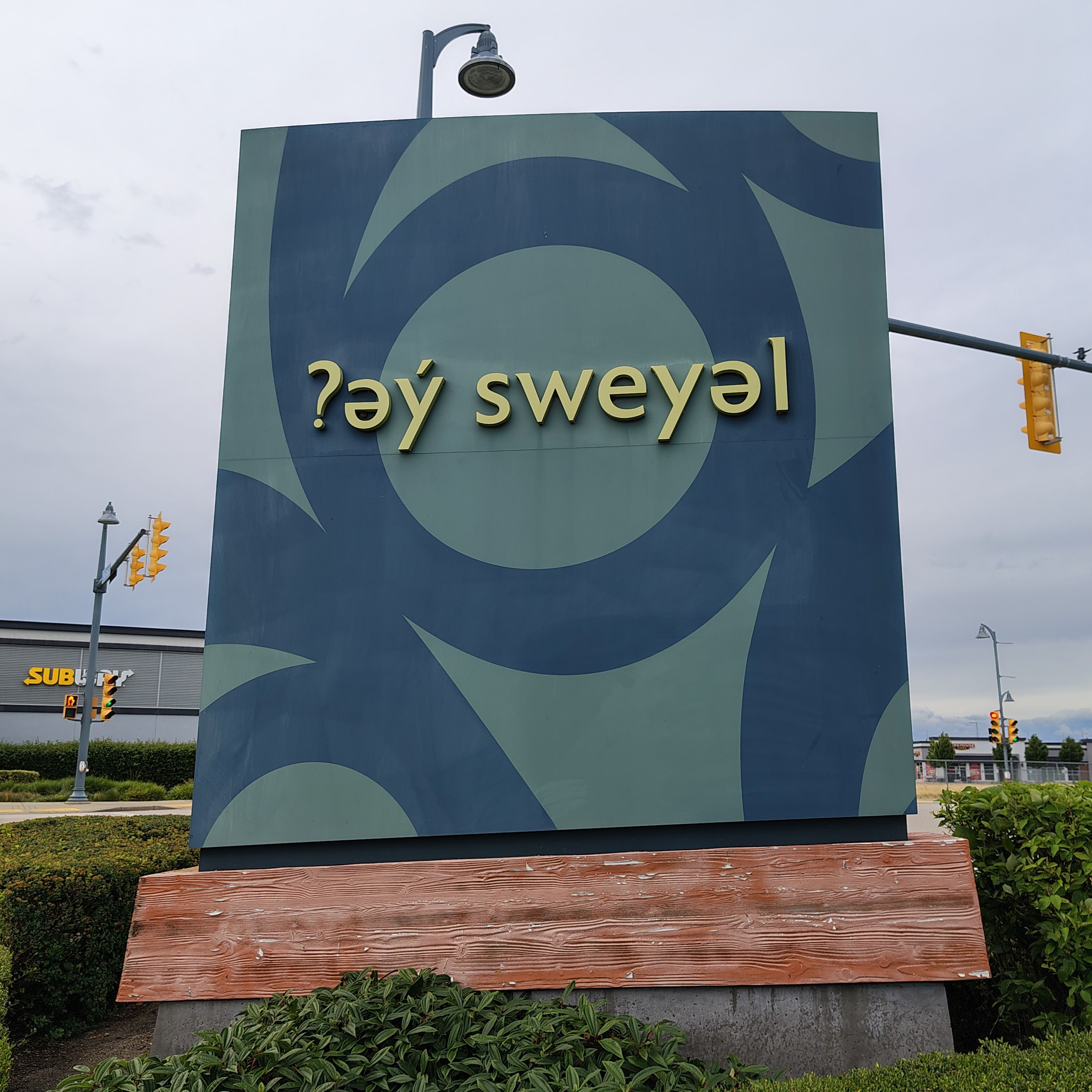
- A farewell sign at Tsawwassen Mills in Delta, British Columbia, Canada. The Halkomelem text reads "ʔəy̓ sweyəl", which means 'good day'.
- Native to: Canada, United States
- Region: Southwestern British Columbia into Northern Washington
- Ethnicity: various Halkomelem-speaking peoples
- Native speakers: c. 100–260 in Canada (2014); 25 in the US (1997)
- Language family: Salishan: Coast Salish; Central; Halkomelem
- Writing system: NAPA

Language codes
- ISO 639-3: hur
- Glottolog: halk1245
- ELP: Hulʻqʻumiʻnumʻ (Halkomelem)
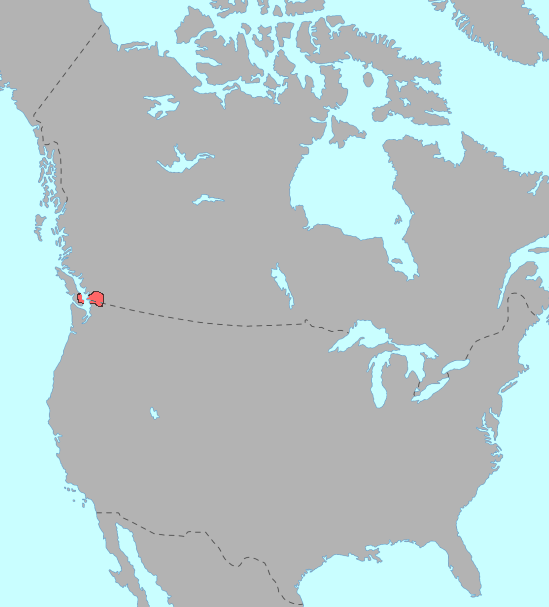

- Halkomelem is classified as Severely Endangered by the UNESCO Atlas of the World's Languages in Danger.

Halkomelem (/ˌhɒlkəˈmeɪləm/ HALL-kə-MAY-ləm; Halq̓eméylem in the Upriver dialect, Hul̓q̓umín̓um̓ in the Island dialect, and hən̓q̓əmin̓əm̓ in the Downriver dialect) is a Salishan language spoken by various First Nations peoples of the British Columbia Coast. It is spoken in British Columbia, ranging from southeastern Vancouver Island from the west shore of Saanich Inlet northward beyond Gabriola Island and Nanaimo to Nanoose Bay and including the Lower Mainland from the Fraser River Delta upriver to Harrison Lake and the lower boundary of the Fraser Canyon.

== Classification ==
In the classification of Salishan languages, Halkomelem is a member of the Central Salish branch. There are four other branches of the family: Tsamosan, Interior Salish, Bella Coola, and Tillamook. Speakers of the Central and Tsamosan languages are often identified in ethnographic literature as "Coast Salish".

== Name ==
The word "Halkomelem" is an anglicization of the name Halq̓eméylem.

== Dialects ==
The language has three distinct dialect groups:

1. Hulquminum / Hulʼqʼumiʼnumʼ (Island dialect) or "Cowichan" (spoken by separate but closely related First Nations on Vancouver Island and adjoining islands on the west side of the Strait of Georgia: the Snuneymuxw (Nanaimo), Snaw-naw-as (Nanoose) – the former "Saalequun tribe" is part of both First Nations, Stzꞌuminus (Chemainus), Cowichan Tribes, Lake Cowichan (Tsꞌuubaa-asatx), an originally Southern Wakashan-speaking people), Halalt, Lyackson, Penelakut, and Lamalchi.
2. Hunʼqumiʼnum / hən̓q̓əmin̓əm̓ (Downriver dialect) or "Musqueam" (spoken by seven First Nations in the Lower Mainland in and around Vancouver, as well as in the Fraser River Delta and the lower reaches of the Fraser River; which consider themselves linguistically and culturally related ethnicities – but do not identify as Stó꞉lō (although in the literature mostly attributed to these), but today often refer to themselves as "Musqueam", the Musqueam, Tsawwassen, Kwantlen, Tsleil-Waututh, New Westminster Indian Band, Kwikwetlem (Coquitlam), Katzie, and the now extinct Snokomish (Derby people).)
3. Halqemeylem / Halqʼeméylem (Upriver dialect) or "Stó꞉lō" (spoken by today 24 Sto꞉lo First Nations upstream along the Fraser River from Matsqui on to Yale; the historic "Tsꞌelxwéyeqw" (Chilliwack) (today's First Nations Aitchelitz, Shxwhá꞉y Village, Skowkale, Soowahlie, Squiala, Tzeachten, and Yakweakwioose), "Pelóxwlh Mestiyexw" (Pilalt/Pilʼalt) (today's First Nations Cheam, Kwaw-kwaw-Apil, and Skwah), "Tiyt" (Tait) or "Upper Stó꞉lō" (today's First Nations Popkum, Skawahlook, Chawathil, Seabird Island, Shxwꞌowꞌhamel, Union Bar, Peters, and Yale), "Pepa꞉thxetel" or "Semà꞉th (Sumas)", and the "Sqʼéwlets/Sqwōwich" (Scowlitz) (Sqꞌewlets First Nation) tribes.

The language differences (namely, in phonology and lexicon) are greatest between the Island and Upriver dialects, with the Downriver dialect (especially the Tsawwassen First Nation) providing a central link between the other two. The diversity of the Halkomelem dialects is noted to be the result of complex social and economic forces and linguistic change, as many Island people crossed the Georgia Strait to camp along the Fraser River (in both the Downriver and Upriver areas) for the summer runs of salmon. Arranged marriages between children in different language areas was also common, helping to establish a regional social network in the Strait of Georgia–Puget Sound Basin.

== Use and revitalization efforts ==
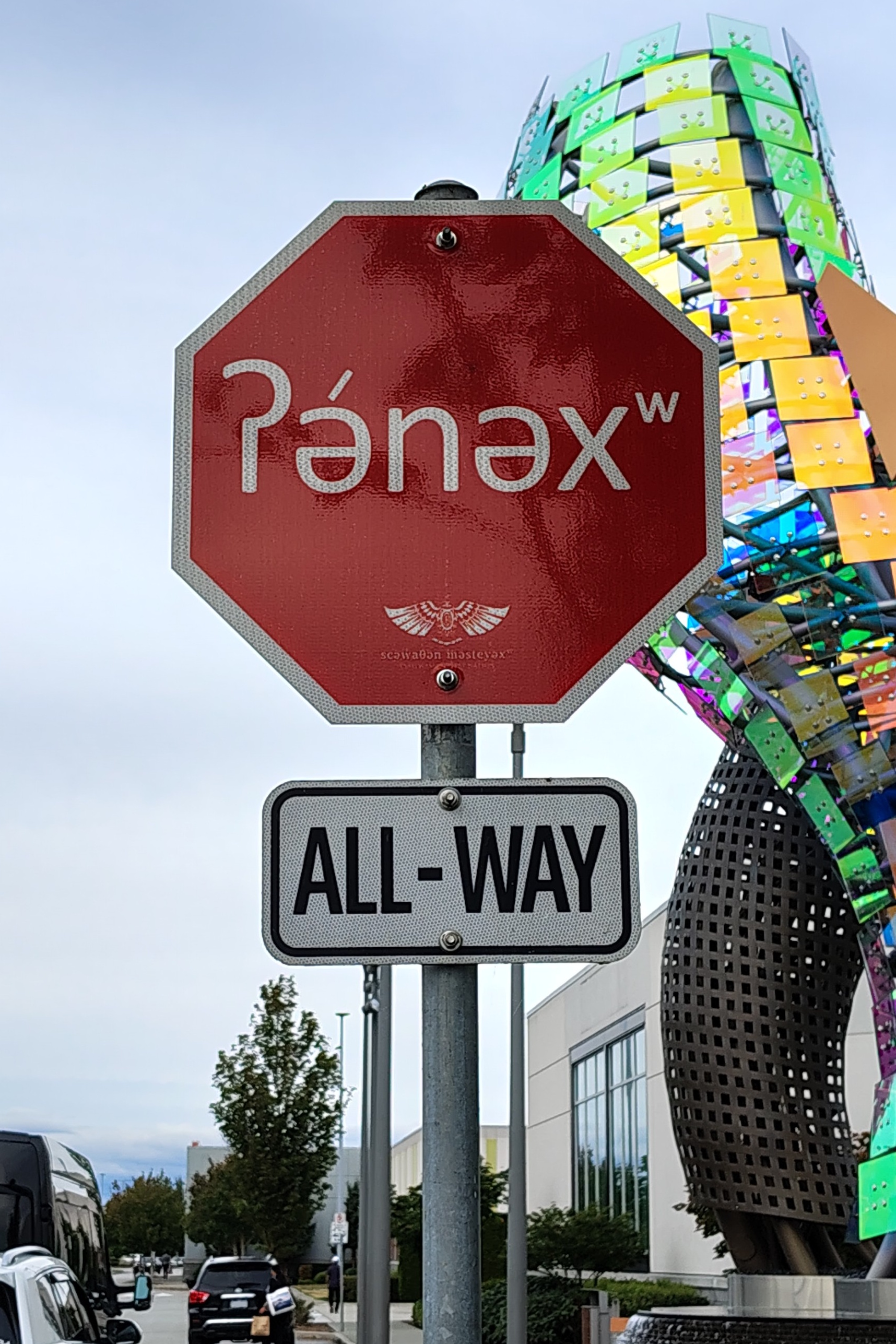
A Halkomelem stop sign at Tsawwassen Mills in Delta, British Columbia, Canada. The text reads "ʔə́nəxʷ".

The First Peoples' Cultural Council reported 263 fluent speakers of Halkomelem in 2014. Community efforts to maintain and teach the language include language classes, the development of teaching materials and the recording of speakers.

Since 1997, Musqueam has worked with the University of British Columbia to support the revitalization of hən̓q̓əmin̓əm̓, the Downriver dialect. The partnership includes university-level language classes offered through UBC's First Nations and Endangered Languages programme. Musqueam community members receive priority registration.

In September 2009, the University of California Press published linguist Brent Galloway's Dictionary of Upriver Halkomelem. The dictionary covers the Upriver dialect and draws on material gathered from speakers between 1970 and its publication, as well as earlier published sources.

== Phonology ==
Note: All examples are drawn from the Downriver dialect of Halkomelem spoken by the Musqueam band. Relevant differences in the phonology of the Island and Upriver dialects are noted at the foot of the phoneme charts.

=== Vowels ===
Halkomelem has five vowel phonemes. Long and short vowels (but not schwa) contrast. Vowel length is written in the native orthography as ⟨·⟩ or ⟨:⟩ after the vowel letter depending on the orthography.

	Front		Central		Back (rounded)	
	short	long	short	long	short	long
High	i	iː ⟨i·⟩			u	uː ⟨u·⟩
Mid	e	eː ⟨e·⟩	ə		o^{1}	oː ⟨o·⟩^{1}
Low			a	aː ⟨a·⟩		

^1 Upriver Halkomelem dialects also have a mid back vowel /o oː/.

All five vowel phonemes vary considerably phonetically. The phoneme /i/ has three distinct allophones. It is realized as [e] following unrounded uvulars. It is realized as [ɪ] with a central off-glide preceding both unrounded and rounded uvulars. Elsewhere, it is realized as low [i] or high [e]. The /e/ is realized as a low to mid-front vowel, usually between [ɛ] or high [æ]. The /a/ is low and central to back, often close to [ɑ]. The /u/ is high, back, and rounded, realized somewhere between low [u] or high [o].

When stressed, the schwa /ə/ appears in most environments as a mid-central, but it is fronted and raised before /x/, approaching [ɪ]; before /j/ it is also fronted, approaching [ɛ]; before /w/ it is lower and back, approaching [ɑ]; and before rounded velars it is mid-back, close to [o]. Unstressed /ə/ can be as high as [ɪ] before /x/ and /j/, and before labialized velars it is realized as [o] or [ʊ]. This phoneme can also be assimilated to a stressed /e/ or a stressed /a/ in an adjacent syllable, by vowel harmony.

=== Consonants ===
		Labial	Dental	Alveolar			Palatal	Velar		Uvular		Glottal
		Labial	Dental	median	sibilant	lateral	Palatal	plain	labial	plain	labial	Glottal
Plosive/ Affricate^{1}	voiceless	p ⟨p⟩	tθ ⟨tθ⟩^{2}	t ⟨t⟩	ts ⟨c⟩		t͡ʃ ⟨č⟩^{2}	k ⟨k⟩^{2}	kʷ ⟨kʷ⟩	q ⟨q⟩	qʷ ⟨qʷ⟩	
Plosive/ Affricate^{1}	ejective	pʼ ⟨p̓⟩	tθʼ ⟨t̓θ⟩	tʼ ⟨t̓⟩	tsʼ ⟨c̓⟩	tɬʼ ⟨ƛ̓⟩	t͡ʃʼ ⟨č̓⟩^{5}	kʼ ⟨k̓⟩^{2}	kʷʼ ⟨k̓ʷ⟩	qʼ ⟨q̓⟩	qʷʼ ⟨q̓ʷ⟩	ʔ ⟨ʔ⟩
Plosive/ Affricate^{1}	voiced^{3}	b ⟨b⟩		d ⟨d⟩			d͡ʒ ⟨j⟩					
Fricative	voiceless	f ⟨f⟩^{3}	θ ⟨θ⟩		s ⟨s⟩	ɬ ⟨ɬ⟩	ʃ ⟨š⟩^{2}	x ⟨x⟩	xʷ ⟨xʷ⟩	χ ⟨x̌⟩	χʷ ⟨x̌ʷ⟩	h ⟨h⟩
Sonorant	voiced	m ⟨m⟩		n ⟨n⟩		l ⟨l⟩	j ⟨y⟩	ɣ ⟨r⟩^{3}	w ⟨w⟩			
Sonorant	glottalized^{4}	mˀ ⟨m̓⟩		nˀ ⟨n̓⟩		lˀ ⟨l̓⟩	jˀ ⟨y̓⟩		wˀ ⟨w̓⟩			

^1 The stops and affricates are grouped together for simplification purposes.
^2 Of recent and/or peripheral phonemic status.
^3 /b d d͡ʒ f ɣ/ occur only in a few borrowed and imitative words.
^4 The five glottalized resonants pose a problem in phonemic analysis, but occur frequently.
^5 Occurs in the Upriver dialect.

The plain plosives are less aspirate before vowels than in English, but they are more aspirate finally. Although the glottalized plosives are ejectives, they are not usually strongly released.

Suttles (2004) makes several interesting notes on the Musqueam obstruents. The labiodental fricative /f/ occurs in recent loans from English and their derivatives such as in káfi "coffee" and in číf "chief". The stops /t/ and /tʼ/ are articulated at a point slightly forward of that of the usual English /t d/, while the affricates c /ts/ and cʼ /tsʼ/ are somewhat more retracted than these same English /t d/. The affricate [d͡ʒ] has only been recorded in kinjáj "English people" and kinjájqən "English (language)". The glottalized lateral affricate /ƛʼ/ [tɬʼ] is produced when the apex of the tongue at the onset is in the position for the lateral release rather than for a /t/, and there is less friction produced than with other affricates. The phonemes /k/ and /kʼ/ occur in "baby talk" as substitutes for /q/ and /qʼ/. The uvular fricative x̌ [χ] is produced with a great deal of friction and/or uvular vibration, and it contrasts strongly with the velar fricative /x/.

There is variation in the extent to which Musqueam speakers glottalize resonants. Phonetically, there are glottalized resonants (e.g. [nˀ]) and resonants preceded or followed by glottal stops (e.g. [ʔn nʔ]), however, Suttles (2004) finds no instances of contrastive distribution among any of the three. He puts forth two explanations for these facts: that there are two sequences of phonemes, /Rʔ/ and /ʔR/, with overlapping [Rˀ] allophones, or that there is a single phoneme /Rˀ/ that is realized in three distinct ways. In preferring the latter explanation, Suttles holds that there may be five glottalized resonant phonemes in the dialect, although Downriver speakers glottalize resonants very lightly, making them difficult to detect.

In most Upriver dialects, glottalized resonants do not exist, while in Island dialects, they are more sharply articulated (tenseness is a key feature of Island speech). As is the case with many other phonological features, Downriver Halkomelem stands as a link between the other dialect areas, and it is possible that its speakers vary depending on Island or Upriver influence. Other differences between dialects include: Island and Downriver have both /n/ and /l/, while Upriver has merged these as /l/. Upriver Halkomelem lacks the post-vocalic glottal stops of the other two dialects, and shows compensatory lengthening in that environment. Additionally, Upriver dialects have greater pitch differences, and some words are differentiated by pitch alone.

=== Stress and pitch ===
Based on Suttles' (2004) recordings of several speakers of the Downriver (Musqueam) dialect, stress in Halkomelem consists of an increase in intensity and an accompanying rise in pitch. The three levels of stress are primary (marked /׳/), secondary (marked /`/), and weak (unmarked). There is one vowel with primary stress in every full word, however, its occurrence is not completely predictable.

In uninflected words with more than one vowel, the primary stress usually falls on the first vowel (e.g. as in céləx "hand" and léləmʼ "house"). There are exceptions to this general pattern (e.g. as in xəmén "enemy"). As shown by the preceding example, if the word contains both a full vowel and one or more schwas, the stress is placed on the full vowel. Again, there are exceptions to this pattern, such as in words with a final glottal stop that cannot be preceded by schwa (e.g. as in nə́cʼaʔ "one").

Although minimal pairs contrasting stress are rare, they do exist in the language. The primary stress of a verb root consisting of a resonant, a schwa, and an obstruent followed by the suffix /-t/ "transitive" can fall on either the root or the suffix, allowing for minimal pairs such as mə̀kʼʷət "salvage it" and məkʼʷə́t "finish it all."

The secondary stress appears most often in words that are composed of a root that has retained its stress and a stressed suffix (e.g. as in cʼéwəθàmx "help me"). It may be the case, however, that the secondary stress recorded by Suttles (2004) in words like cʼéwəθàmx is actually a falling pitch; this seems to be characteristic of the last stressed syllable of a phrase in the language. Additional analyses of the sentential intonation patterns are needed.

=== Phonotactics ===
All obstruents (except the glottals) typically follow one another in sequences of up to four, although a sequence of five is also possible (e.g. as in txʷstx̌ʷásʔal "just standing in shock"). There are no specific restrictions on the types of obstruent sequences that can occur. Plosives appearing in sequences are rearticulated, and sequences of /ss/ are common in the language.

Resonants only appear adjacent to vowels. When these sounds occur in the middle of words, they are found in sequences of resonant-obstruent, resonant-resonant, and obstruent-resonant. An initial resonant is always followed by a vowel, and a final resonant must be preceded by one.

The laryngeals are more restricted than members of the other natural classes in Halkomelem. The glottal stop occurs only adjacent to a vowel, and, within words, it does not follow any obstruent except (the prefix) /s/. It can never occur in final position following a schwa. /h/ occurs only before vowels, following a resonant or one of the fricatives at morpheme boundaries, but never following other obstruents. It can appear between an unstressed and a stressed vowel, but it cannot occur between a stressed and an unstressed vowel.

=== Morphophonemics ===
Certain processes affect the realization of underlying sounds in Halkomelem. Alternations that occur fairly commonly are discussed in this section, rather than in the following section on morphology.

- In rapid speech, there is optional loss of some instances of schwa, glottal stop, glottalization of resonants, and /h/.
  - An unstressed schwa following an initial nasal stop may be lost, if there is a vowel preceding; the nasal is sometimes heard as part of that syllable (e.g. as in tənəmén ~ tən mén "my father").
  - /nə/ with no preceding vowel sometimes appears as syllabic [n] (e.g. as in xʷnəcʼáwəθ ~ xʷncʼáwəθ "one kind").
  - A glottal stop after an unstressed final vowel may be lost, in which case the vowel will be reduced to a schwa (e.g. as in méqeʔ ~ méqə).
  - The glottalization of resonants following unstressed vowels is often inaudible (e.g. as in smənʼé·m ~ sməné·m descendants).
  - /h/ before a stressed vowel may be lost when preceded by a spirant (e.g. as in shá·yʼ ~ sá·yʼ "finished").
- An unstressed schwa may take on the quality of an adjacent full vowel, or one that is separated from it by a glottal stop (e.g. as in "spéʔəθ ~ "spéʔeθ "black bear").
- When a root with the shape of /CARˀ/ (C is any consonant, A is a full vowel, Rˀ is a glottalized resonant), takes the suffix /-ət/ "transitive", the resulting form is /CAʔəRt/. It appears that the resonant and schwa have switched positions (a form of metathesis), but the glottal stop protects the schwa from assimilating to the full vowel (e.g. as in wílʼ "appear" and wíʔəlt "make it appear").
- Several roots appear alone, without having undergone affixation (e.g. as in ʔí "big" and pá "get blown on"). When this type of root is followed by a suffix that begins with a stressed vowel, (e.g. as in /-ínəs/ "chest"), an /h/ appears (e.g. as in θəhínəs "barrel-chested"). A final /h/ is never realized after a stressed vowel.
- A number of suffixes beginning with /n/ have forms with initial /l/ when they are added to a root or stem ending in /l/ (i.e. there is alternation of /n/ and /l/ in certain morphological cases in this language) (e.g. as in /-nəxʷ/ ~ /-ləxʷ/ "limited control" in ɬə́qʼəlləxʷ "know it" and cə́llexʷ "catch up with him").
- In the progressive and resultative forms of few verbs with initial /c/ or /x/ followed by /a/, the /c/ is reduplicated as /kʷ/ and the /x/ as /xʷ/ (e.g. as in cám "go/come inland" and its progressive cákʷəm "be going/coming inland").
- Vowel gradation often occurs between a full vowel, schwa, and zero, depending on the type of root or stem, type of suffix, and placement of stress.
- When some suffixes are joined with stems, a change in the quality of the stressed vowel, from one full vowel to another, in the stem, or (rarely) in the suffix results. The vowel mutations are the product of the assimilation of one vowel to that of an adjacent syllable at an earlier stage in the language's history. Three kinds of these mutations exist (although only the first example is common). In the first two examples, the vowel mutation is similar to the umlauting effect of a suffix on stems in Germanic languages.
  - Stem /e/ changes to /a/ (e.g. as in xʷƛʼáqtəs "long-faced" [ƛʼéqt "long"]).
  - Stem /a/ to /e/ (e.g. as in pé·ltʼθeʔ "buzzard (turkey vulture)", which is composed of spá·l "raven" and the suffix /-itθeʔ/ "clothing, blanket" [with metathesis]).
  - Suffix /e/ to /a/ (e.g. as in sqʼəqʼəxán "partner", which is composed of sqʼəqʼáʔ "accompanying" and the suffix /-xən/ ~ /-xén/ "foot").

== Writing system ==
In 1997, the Musqueam First Nation officially adopted the Americanist phonetic alphabet. This alphabet does not use upper-case letters.

Musqueam (hən̓q̓əmin̓əm̓) alphabet
	c̓	č	h	k	kʷ	k̓ʷ	l	l̓	ƛ̓	ɬ	m	m̓	n	n̓	p	p̓	q	q̓	qʷ
q̓ʷ	s	š	t	t̓	t̓ᶿ	θ	w	w̓	x	xʷ	χ	χʷ	y	y̓	ʔ	a	a꞉	e	e꞉
i	i꞉	u	u꞉	ə	ay	ey	ey̓	əy	əy̓	aw̓	a꞉w̓	ew	iw	iw̓	əw	əw̓			

The xʷəlməxʷqən Cultural Society (XWCS) hən̓q̓əmin̓əm̓ orthography, used by the Tsawwassen, is very similar but uses ⟨·⟩ instead of ⟨:⟩, ⟨x̌⟩ instead of ⟨χ⟩, and ⟨ł⟩ instead of ⟨ɬ⟩.

The Stó꞉lō use a cased Latin alphabet with modifier apostrophes, letter colon for both vowel length and geminate consonants, and the special letters Ō and X̱. The vowel letters are a for /e/, e for /ə/, o for /a/, and ō for /o/. Sh is /s/ before xw, and is found in a few English and French loans.

Using the letter a as a carrier, á marks high tone, à mid tone, and a low tone.

Stó꞉lō alphabet
A a	Ch ch	Chʼ chʼ	E e	H h	I i	K k	Kʼ kʼ	Kw kw	Kwʼ kwʼ
L l	Lh lh	M n	O o	Ō ō	P p	Pʼ pʼ	Q q	Qʼ qʼ	Qw qw
Qwʼ qwʼ	S s	Sh sh	T t	Tʼ tʼ	Th th	Thʼ thʼ	Tlʼ tlʼ	Ts ts	Tsʼ tsʼ
U u	W w	X x	Xw xw	X̱ x̱	X̱w x̱w	Y y	ʼ	꞉	

The Cowichan use a cased Latin alphabet with modifier apostrophes and doubled letters for vowel length. Ou is used for the long [u] sound in French loanwords, and u is used for schwa. The alphabet includes the tetragraph tthʼ.

Cowichan alphabet
A a	Aa aa	Ch ch	Chʼ chʼ	E e	Ee ee	H h	Hw hw	I i	Ii ii
K k	Kw kw	Kwʼ kwʼ	L l	Lʼ lʼ (ʼl)	Lh lh	M m	Mʼ mʼ (ʼm)	N n	Nʼ nʼ (ʼn)
O o	Oo oo	Ou ou	P p	Pʼ pʼ	Q q	Qʼ qʼ	Qw qw	Qwʼ qwʼ	S s
Sh sh	T t	Tʼ tʼ	Th th	Tlʼ tlʼ	Ts ts	Tsʼ tsʼ	Tth tth	Tthʼ tthʼ	U u
W w	Wʼ wʼ (ʼw)	X x	Xw xw	Y y	Yʼ yʼ (ʼy)	ʼ			

=== Typography ===
The Musqueam Band language department collaborated with the University of British Columbia to create a typeface called Whitney Salishan that displays all the characters correctly.

=== Comparison ===
Comparison of Halkomelem alphabets (dated)
IPA	APA	Island	Cowichan	Stó꞉lō (Upriver)
i	i	i		
e ~ ɛ ~ æ	e ~ ɛ ~ æ	e		a
ə ~ ʌ ~ ɪ ~ ʊ	ə ~ ʌ ~ ɪ ~ ʊ	u		e
u	u	oo	ou	u
o	o	–	o	ō
a	a	a		o
p	p	p		
tθ	tᶿ	tth		–
t	t	t		
ts	c	c	ts	
tʃ	č	ch		
k	k	k		
kʷ	kʷ	kw		
q	q	q		
qʷ	qʷ	qw		
ʔ	ʔ	ʼ		
pʼ	p̓	p̓	p̱	pʼ
tθʼ	θʼ	t̓h	t︫t︭h︬	thʼ
tʼ	t̓	t̓	ṯ	tʼ
tɬʼ	ƛ̓	t̓l	t͟l	tlʼ
tsʼ	c̓	c̓	t͟s	tsʼ
tʃʼ	č̓	č̓	c͟h	chʼ
kʼ	k̓	k̓	ḵ	kʼ
kʷʼ	k̓ʷ	k̓w	k͟w	kwʼ
qʼ	q̓	q̓	q̱	qʼ
qʷʼ	q̓ʷ	q̓w	q͟w	qwʼ
θ	θ	th		
ɬ	ł	lh	l̈	lh
s	s	s		
ʃ	š	sh		
x	x	–		x
xʷ	xʷ	xw	hw	xw
χ	x̌, x̣	x̌	ḧ	x̱
χʷ	x̌ʷ, x̣ʷ	x̌w	ḧw	x̱w
h	h	h		
m	m	m		
n	n	n		
l	l	l		
j	y	y		
w	w	w		
mʔ ~ ʔm	m̓	m̓	mʼ ~ ʼm	–
nʔ ~ ʔn	n̓	n̓	nʼ ~ ʼn	–
lʔ ~ ʔl	l̓	l̓	lʼ ~ ʼl	–
jʔ ~ ʔj	y̓	y̓	yʼ ~ ʼy	–
wʔ ~ ʔw	w̓	w̓	wʼ ~ ʼw	–

== Morphology ==
Like the majority of Salishan languages, Halkomelem is polysynthetic. A word in Halkomelem may consist of a root standing alone and unaltered, or of a root altered by one or more processes of internal modification and/or accompanied by one or more affixes. Since all words (with the exception of a few adverbs) can function as predicate heads, there is no basis for distinguishing verbs, nouns, and adjectives. There are other bases, however, for distinguishing these classes. Verbs have progressive forms and do not take possessive affixes, while nouns do not have progressive forms and do take possessive affixes. Adjectives have neither progressive forms, nor do they take possessive affixes. Compounding is non-existent in the language, although some scholars believe to have found a few possible examples.

The majority of verb roots have the shapes CAC, CəC, CəCC, while noun roots typically have the shape CVCVC (V is any vowel). The most common shapes of adjective roots are CəC and CAC. There is a prefix that nominalizes verbs and adjectives, and there are several prefixes that make verbs out of nouns. Additionally, there are several ways to make adjective-like words from nouns. Processes of internal modification of the root include reduplication (of initial CV and CVC), shift in stress and vowel grade, and glottalization of resonants (which also affects suffixes). Roots of different shapes often undergo different processes to produce forms that are grammatically identical.

=== Verbs ===
Verbs roots are identified as perfective, as opposed to progressive, aspect.

- Perfective sə̀qʼ "split, tear"
- Progressive səsə̀qʼ "be splitting, be tearing"

Several verbs also have a durative aspect, which can occur in both forms.

- Perfective qʼíkʼʷət "bite it"
- Progressive qʼíqʼəkʼʷət "be biting it"

A number also have an iterative-dispositional aspect. For a few of these verb roots, this aspect can appear in both a progressive and in a perfective form.

- sə́qʼsəqʼ "easy to split"

The majority of verbs have a resultative form which is adjective-like and does not carry a progressive-perfective distinction.

- ssəsíqʼ "split, torn"
- skʼʷəkʼʷíɬ "spilled, capsized"

The plural can be optionally marked in all of these forms. The diminutive is also marked, optionally, in only the progressive and resultative aspects.

=== Nouns ===
It is possible to internally modify noun roots in Halkomelem for the plural, the diminutive, and the diminutive plural. Compare:

- céləx "hand"
- cəlcéləx "hands"
- cécləx "little hand"
- cəcécləx "little hands"

A few nouns may have resultative forms. They do not have progressive forms, but they may be made into a verb with a verbalizing affix and then express this form.

=== Adjectives ===
Similar to noun roots, adjective roots can be internally modified for plural, diminutive, and diminutive plural. They can only have progressive forms if made into verbs by means of a verbalizing affix.

- pʼə́qʼ "white"
- pʼépʼqʼ "white" (PL)

Complex adjectives are formed from adjective roots and lexical suffixes.

- máʔəqʷ "large bird"

=== Affixes ===
Halkomelem contains prefixes, suffixes, and infixes. All infixes of the language have been described in the preceding sections. Affixes are typically divisible into inflectional or derivational and grammatical or lexical categories, depending on their involvement in paradigms and meaning; however, a number of Halkomelem affixes mix these categories. Suttles (2004) identifies the following classes of suffixes and prefixes; a sampling of these affixes follow.

- Non-personal affixes
  - Suffixes of the voice system
    - Transitive: /-t/ /-nəxʷ/ /-x/ "transitive"
    - Intransitive: /-əm/ "intransitive", /-éls/ "activity" (compare pə́n "get buried", pə́nət "bury it", pə́nəm "plant", and pə́néls "bury something")
    - Causative: /-stəxʷ/ "causative"
    - Permissive: /-s/ "let", as in "let him go" or "let it be"
    - Applicative: /-nəs/ "goal" (e.g. as in nəʔémnəs "go after him"), /-ném/ "go"
    - Reflexive: /-θət/ "oneself", /-námət/ "oneself (limited control)"
    - Reciprocal: /-təlʼ/ "each other"
    - Subordinate passive: /-ət/ "subordinate passive"
  - Aspectual and modal affixes
    - Aspectual prefixes: /wə-/ "established", wəɬ- "already"
    - Modal suffixes: /-ə́lmən/ "want to, intend to, seem about to"
  - Derivational affixes
    - Affixes with purely grammatical meaning
      - Nominalizing prefix: /s-/ "nominalize (verbs and adjectives)"
    - Verbalizing affixes (combine grammatical and lexical meaning): /c-/ "get, make, do, go to", ɬ- "partake of", /txʷ-/ "buy", /-à·l/ "travel by"
    - Lexical prefixes: /mə-/ "come", /tən-/ "from"
    - Lexical suffixes
      - Body parts: /-aqʷ/ "head"
      - Common artifacts: /-wət/ "canoe"
      - Natural phenomena: /-ətp/ "plant, tree"
- Personal affixes

=== Possessive affixes ===
The following table lists the possessive affixes which appear in attributive possessive structures in Halkomelem.

Attached to word prior	Attached to possessed head	Translation
-əl / -l		'my'
-ɛ́ / -ʔɛ́		'your (singular)'
	-s	'her, his, its, their'
	-cət	'our'
-ɛ́ / -ʔɛ́	-ələp	'your (plural)'

Possession is marked either on the possessed noun (the head) or the word preceding it through these affixes. Together with the appearance of affixes, possession also requires a structural component, in that the possessor of the head is found to the right of the head. The possessor is always preceded by a determiner, although depending on the noun class, it can also appear with an oblique case marker. If the possessor is a common noun, it will be introduced by a determiner, but without an oblique case marker. If, however, the possessor is a proper noun, it must appear in the oblique case. Thus, it will be preceded by an oblique case marker, and the possessed noun will appear without a possessive affix. For proper nouns, the determiner and the oblique case marker are fused into a single particle. Marking common nouns with an oblique case marker results in an ungrammatical construction:

kʷθə sqʷəmeyʔ-s ɫe sɫeniʔ	AUX dog-3POS DET woman	'the woman's dog'
kʷθə pukʷ-s ɫe sɫeniʔ	AUX book-3POS DET woman	'the woman's book'
kʷθə sqʷəmeyʔ ʔə-ʎ John	DET dog OBL-DET John	'John's dog'

Most verbs roots are semantically patient-oriented (e.g. they have glosses like "get hit" or "get washed"), while few verbs are semantically agent-oriented (e.g. "look" or "see"). All are grammatically intransitive. These relations are different with the suffixes of the voice system. A verb that is made up of an inactive root and an intransitive suffix is grammatically intransitive, but semantically active. An inactive or active root that takes on a transitive suffix is grammatically transitive and takes an object. The transitive suffix is the base for an object or passive person suffix. Two of the most commonly used transitive suffixes distinguish actions performed with limited control or accidentally from those performed with full control or purposely.

Aspectual prefixes, which precede predicate heads, have adverbial meaning and express temporal distinctions. Modal suffixes follow the suffixes of the voice system and indicate desire or intention and search or arrangement.

Lexical suffixes can be related to verb roots as objects, locus, or instruments; to adjective roots as noun heads; and to noun roots as noun possessors or the noun heads of modifiers.

The personal affixes distinguish first, second, and third person in singular and plural. There are neither dual forms nor inclusive/exclusive distinctions in this language. There is also a set of possessive affixes (prefixes for first and second person singular, suffixes for first-person plural and third person, and a combination of prefix and suffix for second-person plural). This system will be covered, in detail, in the "Syntax" section.

=== Ordering of affixes ===
Derivational prefixes and suffixes form an inner layer around the word root, while inflectional affixes form an outer layer around the root. Among derivational affixes, those with lexical meaning stand closer to the root than those with purely grammatical meaning. Among inflectional affixes, those of the voice and person systems stand closer to the root than the aspectual prefixes and modal suffixes.

- xʷqʷénəctəs. "[She] punches holes in the bottom of it."

== Syntax ==
In Musqueam, a sentence minimally consists of a predicate. Predicate heads can be bare roots (e.g. cákʼʷ "far"), derived forms (e.g. spéʔeθ "black bear"), inflected forms (e.g. cʼéwət "help him/her/them"), and forms including both derivational and inflectional affixes (e.g. kʷə́xnəct "name-base-transitive," as in "name a price"). Predicate heads can also be words that are definable morphologically. This includes verbs (e.g. ném "go"), adjectives (e.g. θí "big"), nouns (e.g. swə́yʼqeʔ "man"), members of the closed sets of personal words (see the following section), and interrogative words (e.g. stém "what").

A verbal predicate may be expanded with the addition of one or two auxiliary verbs before the head and/or one or more adverbs preceding or following the head.

- ʔi(AUX) cən cʼécʼəw-ət. "I am helping him."
  - Two pairs of verbs function as auxiliaries, setting the predicate within a spatial context. The choice between the locative pair, /ʔi/ "be here" and /niʔ/ "be there," depends on the location of the speaker relative to whatever the predicate refers to. The directional auxiliaries, /ʔəmí/ "come" and /ném/ "go," identify motions toward or away from the speaker.
- ƛʼ(ADV) cən nəwɬ x̌té. "I did it again."

Verb heads are also found with verb complements and compound verbs.

- θə́t("try") ɬákʷ. "He tried to fly."

Like verbal predicates, adjectival and nominal predicates can be expanded with other elements. Nominal predicate heads can appear alone, followed by particles and adverbs.

- swə́yʼqeʔ cən. "I am a man."
- swə́yʼqeʔ čxʷ ƛʼe. "You're a man too."

Syntactically, adjectival and nominal predicate heads appear with auxiliaries less often than verbs. Adjectives and nouns can appear together in nominal predicates expanded with adjectives. A nominal predicate head can be preceded by a modifying adjective or numeral.

- ʔə́yʼ("good") čxʷ("you") swə́yʼqeʔ("man"). "You're a good man."

Adjectives usually appear as predicate heads accompanied by particles only, but they can be preceded by auxiliaries and adverbs acting as intensifiers.

- kʼʷámʼkʼʷəmʼ cən. "I'm strong."
- ni(AUX) ʔukʼʷámʼkʼʷəmʼ. "He [absent] is strong all right."
- x̌ə́ɬ(ADV) qʼáqʼəyʼ. "He was very sick."

=== Person markers ===
The Halkomelem person markers (forms that correspond in meaning to English personal pronouns) include a set of affixes, one set of particles, and two sets of words (personal and possessive). As mentioned in the "Morphology" section, there is no dual number or inclusive/exclusive distinction in the language. However, some scholars believe that the forms identified here as second-person "singular" were once used in addressing a married couple, a pair of brothers, or even a family, while the "plural" forms were used for a larger or less integrated group.

==== First- and second-person argument particles ====
The first- and second-person particles pattern like a nominative–accusative case marking system. In other words, the same particles mark first- and second-person arguments in both intransitive and transitive predicates in main clauses (coordinate constructions).

	Singular	Plural
First-person	cən	ct
Second-person	čxʷ	ce·p

Suttles (2004) classified the first- and second-person argument particles as second-position predicate particles, along with about twenty other particles that can appear within the predicate. Most of the second-position predicate particles are mobile, appearing after the first word of the predicate (whatever that may be). If the only word in the predicate is the head, the first- and second-person argument particles will follow it; if the head is preceded by an auxiliary verb, they will follow the auxiliary; if the head is preceded by an adverb, they will follow the adverb.

- cʼéw-ət cən ceʔ. "I'll help him/her/them."
- ʔi cən cʼécʼəw-ət. "I am helping him/her/them."
- lə́qʼ cən wəmʼi técəl. "I generally get here."

==== Object person markers ====
An object person marker can only be suffixed to a transitive verb (i.e. a verb stem that has a transitive suffix). The four forms appear to be composed of identifiable elements: /-S/ and /-am/ "non-third-person singular", /-al-/ "non-third-person plural", /-x/ and /-xʷ/ "first person", and /-ə/ second person. Third-person objects are unmarked.

	Singular	Plural
First-person	-Samx ~ -amx	-alʼxʷ
Second-person	-Samə ~ -amə	-alə

The element /-S/ occurs with the transitivizer /-t/, and they coalesce as /θ/. With the root cʼéw- "help" and /-t/ "transitive", we find:

- cʼéwəθàmx "help me"
- cʼéwəθàlʼxʷ "help us"

These forms are normally accompanied by person markers.

==== Third-person arguments ====
The third-person arguments follow an ergative–absolutive system. With an intransitive predicate head, a third-person argument is like a third-person object in being marked by zero. Plurality is optionally indicated by the particle ʔé·ɬtən.

- némʼ ceʔ. "He/she/it/they will go."
- némʼ ceʔ ʔé·ɬtən. "They will go."

With a transitive predicate head in a main clause, on the other hand, a third-person agent must be marked by the suffix /-əs/. It always follows the transitivizer and object person marker, if any. Unlike the first- and second-person particles, the suffix does not move to follow an auxiliary or adverb. Again, the plurality of the third-person may be indicated by the particle ʔé·ɬtən.

- cʼéwətəs ceʔ. "He/she will help him/her."
- ni cʼéwətəs. "He/she helped him/her."
- kʼʷəcnámxəs ceʔ ʔé·ɬtən. "They will see me."

==== Constraints ====
In the active paradigm, a third person cannot be the agent with a second person as the object. Instead, we find passive forms.

- cʼéwətàləm ceʔ. "You folks will be helped."

Only third persons can be agents in the passive. Other relations (e.g. the forms "*I am seen by you" or "*he is seen by me") can be expressed only in the active (e.g. "you see me" and "I see him").

==== Subordinate clauses ====
A subordinate clause is produced by prefixing one of the two subordinating particles, /wə-/ "if, when, that" and /ʔəl/ "whenever, whatever," to the first word in a predicate and replacing its coordinate agent marker with a subordinate agent marker. Subordinate agent markers are the same in both intransitive and transitive active predicates.

	Singular	Plural
First-person	-e·n ~ -ən	-ət
Second-person	-əxʷ	-e·p ~ -əp
Third-person	-əs	same as singular

Subordinate clauses usually follow main clauses, but there are a few exceptions.

- kʼʷəcnámə cən ceʔ, wənémʼè·n. "I will see you, if/when/that I go."

== Basic words and phrases ==
English	Halq̓eméylem
Hello/Greetings	kwéleches
How are you?	lichexw we eyo
I am fine	tsel we eyo
Thank you	kwʼas ho꞉y
What is your name?	tewat teʼ skwix
1	letsʼe
2	isa꞉le
3	lhi꞉xw
4	X̱eʼo꞉thels
5	lheqʼa꞉tses
6	tʼx̱em
7	tho꞉kws
8	teqa꞉tsa
9	tu꞉xw
10	o꞉pel

== See also ==
- List of Halkomelem-speaking peoples
- Brent Galloway
- Donna Gerdts
- Patricia Shaw
- Wayne Suttles
