= Musqueam First Nation =

Musqueam Nation xʷməθkʷəy̓əm
- First Nation
- Musqueam Indian Band
- Flag Seal
- Etymology: From the Hunʼqumiʼnum name xʷməθkʷəy̓əm, meaning "place where the muthkwey grows"
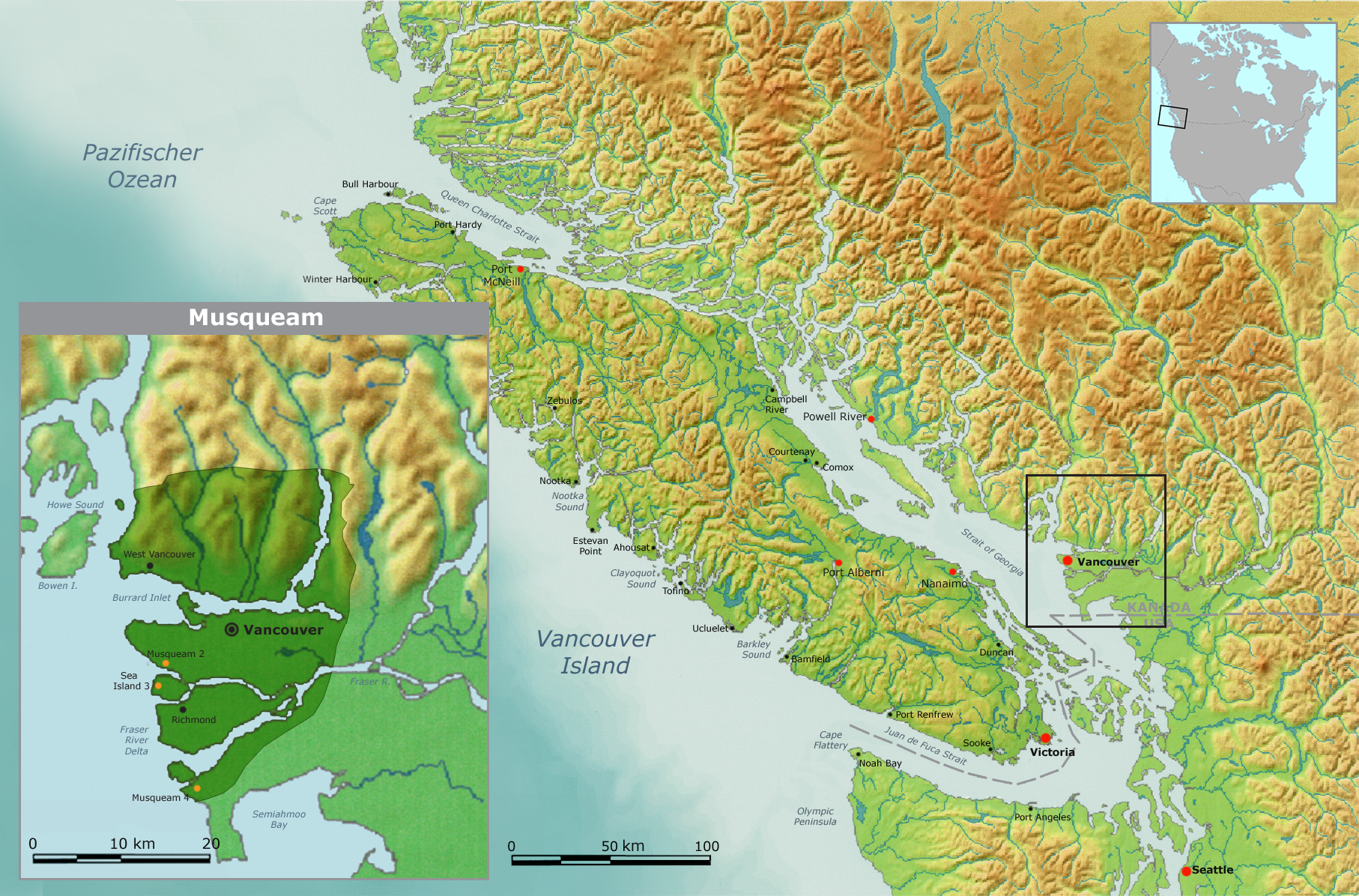
- Traditional territory of the Musqueam Nation, as defined by the 1976 Musqueam Declaration

- Location in British Columbia
- Country: Canada
- Province: British Columbia

Government
  - Type: Band council
  - Chief: Wayne Sparrow
  - Councillors: Full list (10): Morgan Guerin; Megan Harkey-Mentzos; Allyson Fraser; Gordon Grant; Angela Point; Kim Guerin; Jordan Point; Michele Point; Alec Guerin; Richard Sparrow

Area
  - Traditional territory: 1,448.88 km^{2} (559.42 sq mi)
  - Reserve land: 2.73 km^{2} (1.05 sq mi)

Population (2021)
  - Total: 1,656
- Time zone: UTC-7 (Pacific Time Zone–MST)
- Postal code span: V6N (Musqueam 2), V4K 3N2 (Musqueam 4)
- Area codes: 604, 778, 236, 672
- Ethnic group: Coast Salish
- Languages: Hunʼqumiʼnum; English
- Reserves: Musqueam 2 (main); Musqueam 4; Sea Island 3
- Website: www.musqueam.bc.ca

- Person: xʷməθkʷəy̓əm
- People: xʷməθkʷəy̓əm
- Language: hən̓q̓əmin̓əm̓
- Country: šxʷməθkʷəy̓əmaɁɬ təməxʷ

The Musqueam Nation is a First Nation whose traditional territory encompasses the western half of what is now Greater Vancouver, in British Columbia, Canada. It is governed by a band council and is known officially as the Musqueam Indian Band under the Indian Act. "Musqueam" (/ˈmʌskwiəm/ MUS-kwee-əm) is an anglicization of the Hunʼqumiʼnum name xʷməθkʷəy̓əm, which means "place where the muthkwey grows".

== Etymology ==
"Musqueam" is derived from the Hunʼqumiʼnum name xʷməθkʷəy̓əm, meaning "place where the muthkwey (məθkʷəy̓) grows".

The oral history of the Musqueam people speaks to the muthkwey plant's cultural significance. The Musqueam origin story tells of an enormous double-headed serpent (sʔi:ɬqəy̓) which lived in Camosun Bog (xʷməm̓qʷe:m). The serpent was so massive that its winding path created the Fraser River (stal̕əw̓). All living things that crossed the serpent's path were said to have died, and from the serpent's droppings bloomed the Muthkwey plant, which grew abundantly around the serpent's home. The people of the area therefore named the land xʷməθkʷəy̓əm.

== History ==
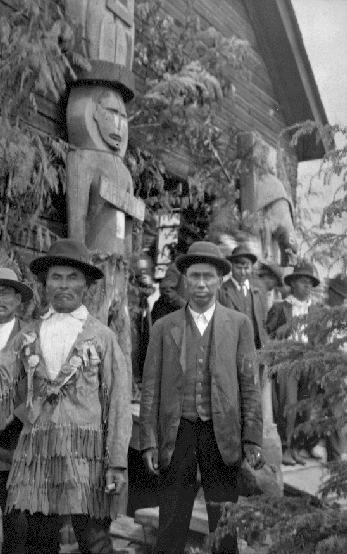
Musqueam people and chief, 1913

The Musqueam people have lived in the Point Grey area (today part of Vancouver), around the mouth of the Fraser River, for at least 4,000 years. Archaeological evidence taken from the Marpole Midden (or Great Fraser Midden) attest to the Musqueam people's thousands-year-old history in the area. The Marpole Midden was the location of c̓əsnaʔəm, the largest village in Musqueam some 2,500 years ago. The changing river delta prompted its inhabitants to move to the present site of the Musqueam 2 reserve starting approximately 1,500 years ago. Musqueam 2 has a residential area called "Musqueam Village"; the reserve formerly had a second residential area, the village of Ma Li (maləy̓).

The Marpole Midden is also the location of a burial ground sacred to the Musqueam. It was desecrated by non-native archeologists in the late 19th and early 20th century. Harlan Ingersoll Smith, an archaeologist from the American Museum of Natural History participating in the Jesup North Pacific Expedition from 1897 to 1900, unilaterally excavated from the midden the skeletal remains of up to 75 Musqueam, taking them with him back to New York City to be researched and exhibited. The belongings of those buried at the site, including tools, jewelry, carved artworks and ceremonial objects, were also excavated and taken. The midden consisted mostly of layers of biofacts such as shells and non-human animal bones, which were not taken.

In 1913, the Canadian federal government and BC provincial government jointly established the McKenna–McBride Royal Commission (officially the "Royal Commission on Indian Affairs") to finalize the boundaries of reserve lands. The Musqueam people gave testimonies to federal and provincial commissioners in which they reasserted their rights to live, fish, and hunt on their traditional, unceded territories. In his testimony, Musqueam chief Johnny (χʷəyχʷayələq) contrasted the Musqueam people's traditional ways of fishing and hunting with those of recently arrived settlers:

I have a few words to say yet. It is indeed true what the Chairman said, the Indian's custom of taking fish was only by the means of a small net, and they only caught very few, so as not to destroy the fish with a net only 3 feet wide. This is the reason I say that I did not destroy the fish. It is the Whiteman that brought the long nets and catches all kinds of fish. That is the reason the fish are all going away. Whenever we go out and hunt for the deer, if we get one we bring it down and use all the meat – we do not waste any of it, only the guts and the tripe is left behind. The Whiteman goes out hunting for the deer, sometime they shoot a buck and just take the horns or maybe just take the skin off and leave the meat there. It is a living for the Indians, it is a pleasure for the whites, and about the ducks it is the same way. When the Whitemen go out, they shoot all descriptions of ducks and leave them floating in the sea, but when the Indians go out shooting, they know when they have enough but the Whiteman never knows, and about the fish it is the same way. The Whitemen use a long net, and whenever they get so much fish that they cannot sell them, they throw them overboard – but the Indians do not do that whenever we get or catch fish, we know when to stop and we eat or sell all we catch. These are the grievances I bring before you commissioners, and I say that the food of the Indians is being seized and destroyed.

He also reasserted the Musqueam people's right to fish along the Fraser River, saying:

When I want to go fishing, the two parties are also holding on to each end of my boat – there are initials and numbers on the bow and initials and numbers on the stern, and I know that I own the water ... When I want to catch fish for my living I do not want to be interfered with at all.

The Musqueam Nation completed a reconciliation agreement with the Province in 2008 which transferred ownership of the land occupied by the University Golf Club and the River Rock Casino Resort to the Nation.

In 2016, the Musqueam, Squamish, and Tsleil-Waututh nations partnered to form the MST Development Corporation in order to develop properties owned or co-owned by the nations.

== Territory ==
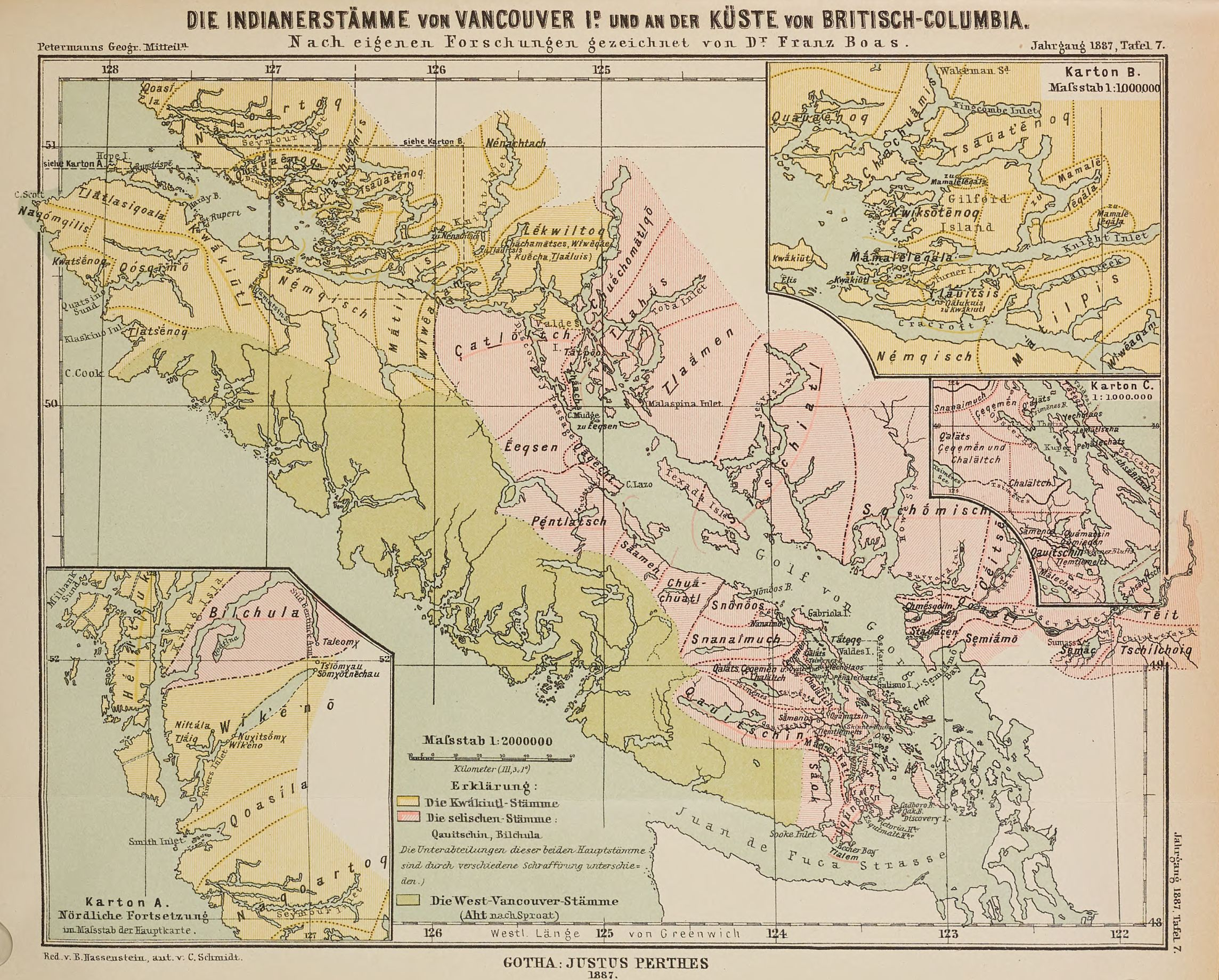
1887 map by German-American anthropologist Franz Boas showing Indigenous territories in southwest British Columbia. Musqueam is labelled "Chmésqoim".

=== Musqueam Declaration ===
On June 10, 1976, the Musqueam people collectively made the Musqueam Declaration, which was ratified by then Musqueam chief, Delbert Guerin, and the five members of the Musqueam band council. The Musqueam Declaration described the traditional territory of the Musqueam people as follows:

The lands, lakes and streams defined and included by a line commencing at Harvey Creek in Howe Sound and proceeding Eastward to the height of land and continuing on the height of land around the entire watershed draining into English Bay, Burrard Inlet and Indian Arm; South along the height of land between Coquitlam River and Brunette River to the Fraser River, across to the South or left bank of the Fraser River and proceeding downstream taking in the left Bank of the main stream and the South Arm to the sea, including all those intervening lands, islands and waters back along the sea shore to Harvey Creek, AND, the sea, its reefs, flats, tidal lands and islands adjacent to the above described land and out to the centre of Georgia Strait.

=== Reserves ===
The reserves under the administration of the band are:

- Musqueam 2 (xʷməθkʷəy̓əm), at the mouth of the Fraser River to the north of Sea Island, 470 acres (190.40 ha). 49°14′00″N 123°13′00″W
- Musqueam 4, to the east of Canoe Passage near Westham Island, 142 acres (57.30 ha). 49°04′00″N 123°07′30″W
- Sea Island 3 (sqʷsaθən), on the northwest corner of Sea Island, 16 acres (6.50 ha). 49°12′35″N 123°12′00″W

== Language ==
The Musqueam people speak Hunʼqumiʼnum (hən̓q̓əmin̓əm̓), the downriver dialect of the Salishan language Halkomelem. The Musqueam people are closely related to neighbouring peoples of the lower Fraser River. The nearby Kwantlen and Katzie First Nations just upriver share the same dialect, while the upriver Sto:lo people speak another dialect, Halkomelem (Halq'əméyləm) or the upriver dialect. The Cowichan, Chemainus, Snuneymuxw and neighbouring Coast Salish peoples of Vancouver Island and the parts of the Gulf Islands of the southern Gulf of Georgia speak a third dialect, Hulquminum (Hul'qumi'num'), often called the straits or island dialect. It is not to be confused with North Straits Salish, which is a group of related dialects to the south.

In early 2018, the University of British Columbia (UBC) installed 54 Hunʼqumiʼnum-language street signs at its main campus, located in the Point Grey area. UBC's satellite campus in Okanagan had already put up signs in Nsyilxcen, the language of the Okanagan Nation.

== Flag ==
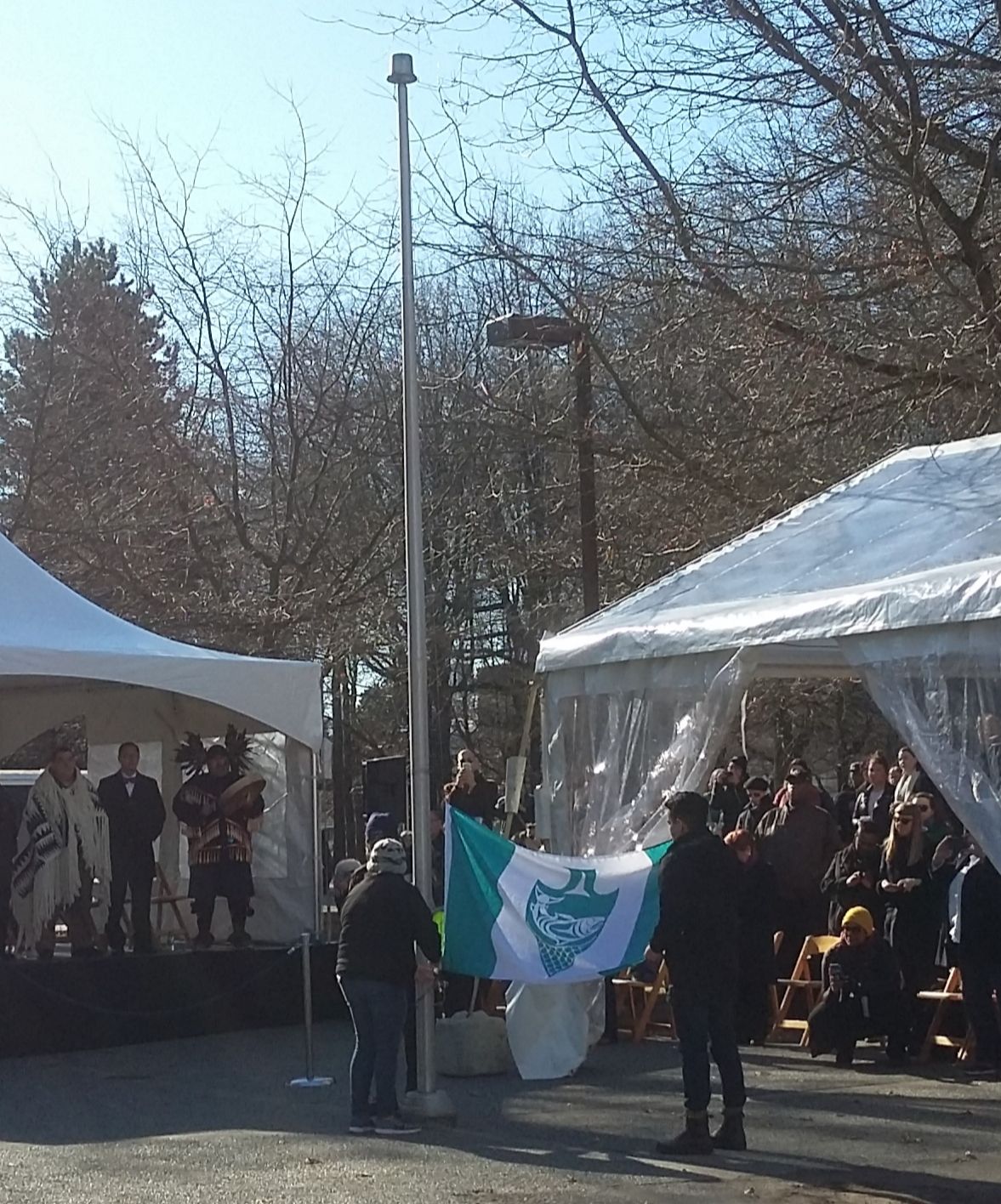
Musqueam students Grace Point (left) and Brett Sparrow (right) raise the Musqueam flag at UBC's Point Grey campus, February 25, 2019.

The Musqueam flag was designed by Musqueam artist Susan Point, who also helped design the flag of Nunavut. The design of the flag is a white Canadian pale on a teal field, with an arrowhead in the centre depicting a salmon leaping above a net.

The flag was permanently raised at UBC's Point Grey campus during a public ceremony on February 25, 2019. The act was meant to symbolize the university's commitment to furthering their partnership with the Musqueam people, as the Vancouver campus is located on unceded Musqueam territory. Musqueam students Grace Point and Brett Sparrow were invited to raise the flag. Musqueam chief Wayne Sparrow and then UBC president Santa Ono were in attendance.

== Economic Development ==
Economic development of Musqueam lands is completed by the Musqueam Capital Corporation. The corporation also manages multiple real estate holdings throughout the lower mainland which are owned by the nation.

In October 2025, the Musqueam Nation agreed to partner with the Snuneymuxw First Nation in the latter's purchase of the River Rock Casino. The Musqueam Nation was in talks to acquire the River Rock Casino prior to the acquisition by the Snuneymuxw First Nation.

The Musqueam Capital Corporation also participates in business partnerships with other companies, such as with local developer Townline to construct the redevelopment of the Vancouver Alpen Club.
