= Coast Salish weaving =

Pacific Northwest Indigenous textile art form

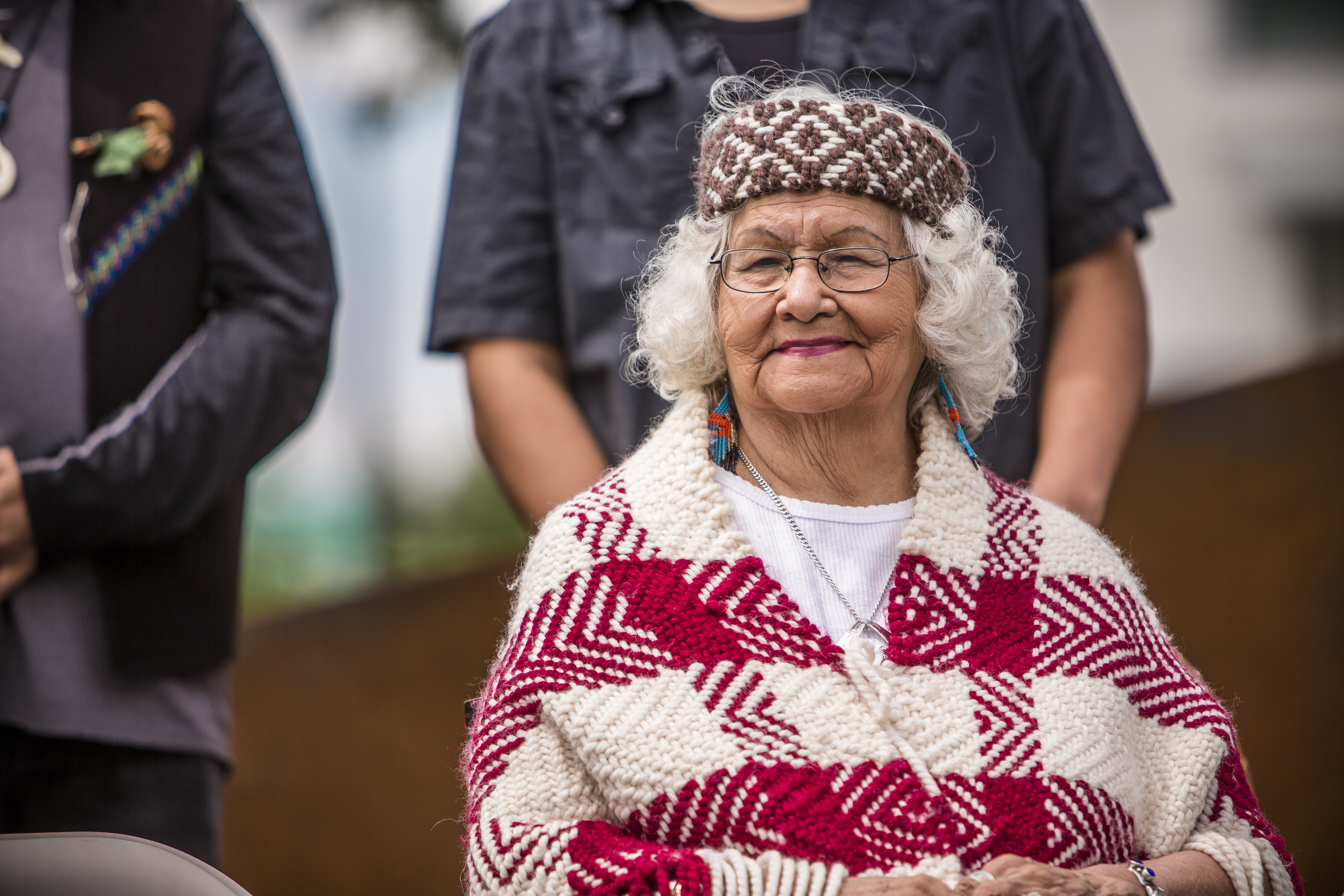
Squamish elder Audrey Rivers wearing wool regalia at a pole raising ceremony, 2012

Coast Salish weaving is a customary textile art of Coast Salish peoples in the Pacific Northwest. They are most noted for their twill blankets. The adoption of new fabrics, dyes, and weaving techniques allow the study of a wide variety of Salish weavings today.

== History ==
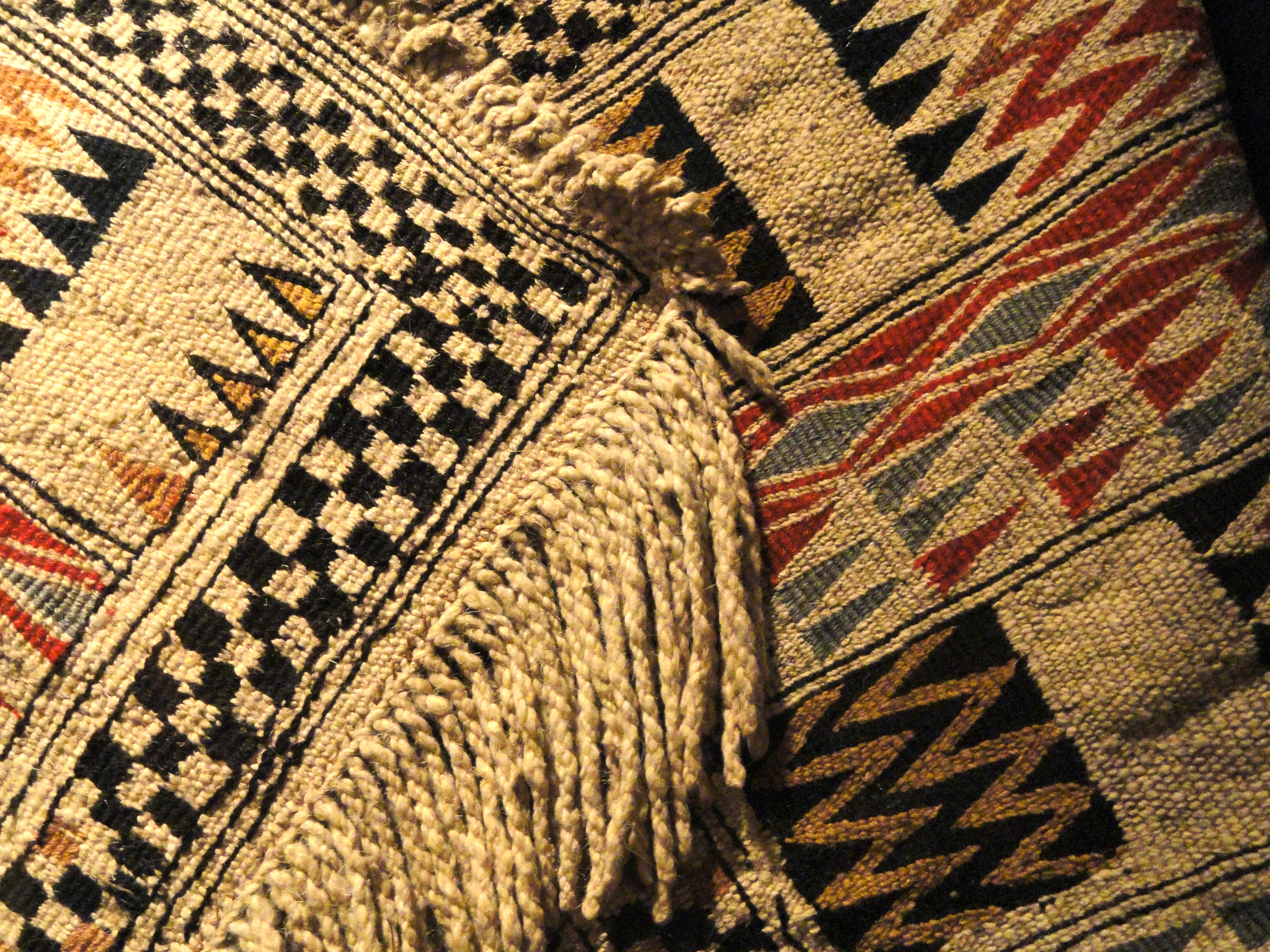
Detail of a woven Salish cloak, pre-1828

According to oral history, blankets have been used for ceremonial purposes since the beginning of time. Coast Salish blankets identified the wearer as being a civic and religious leader in the community. Honored individuals would be adorned with a blanket to distinguish them or they would sit or stand upon their blankets so as to raise them in accordance of their honored status. Blankets also represented an individual's wealth and were often given away to members of the community or even other villages to show prosperity. Because of their high value, blankets were also used as a currency for which other goods could be purchased or bartered.

Women were in charge of making the blankets. Young girls were trained by their grandmothers as early as ten years of age, with more intense training at puberty. Weaving blankets required serious commitment and could take long periods of time to complete. Additionally, they were often associated with spiritual tasks or rituals such as abstinence.

== Geography ==
The name Salish refers to groups of indigenous peoples in the Pacific Northwest whose speech and culture share enough of a commonality to suggest an ancient relationship, in a similar vein to the name Indo-Europeans or the name Polynesians. The region inhabited by this group includes the north of the Fraser canyon to Vancouver Island, to Aberdeen in Washington. The Nuxálk region, farther north, also speak the Salish dialect. Though the Salishan peoples were highly stratified, with a relatively complex division of labor and a powerful elite, each village was distinct from the others, the Salish region was not unified and those people who inhabited the Salish regions did not view themselves as part of a unified Salish group, much like Indo-European and Polynesian peoples.

== Traditions ==
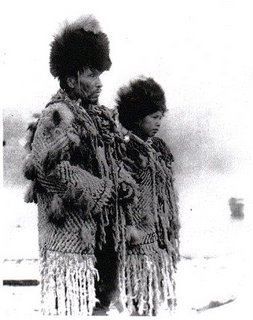
Squamish Chief George and his daughter wearing Coast Salish woven clothing, Sen̓áḵw, British Columbia, 1902

During the potlatch ceremony blankets would be distributed among the attendants as a show of wealth. While the attendants obtained the blankets the donor gained prestige allowing for him to raise his social status. Sometimes, in order to supply as many people with blankets as possible, the blankets at would be cut in pieces so that more attendees could receive a gift. These fragments would often be reworked and incorporated into larger blankets.

In the winter season, spirit dances were often held. Here, a group of men would perform a dance. A change in the song could lead to their being "possessed" allowing them to perform a dance unlike the others. Spectators often would give blankets as gifts to these new dancers to honor them.

== Weaving techniques ==
The Salish adopted many of the numerous weaving techniques. These include: wrapped, diagonal openwork, vertical and slanting openwork, openwork, overlay, simple twining, three stand twining, plain openwork and double twining. The most frequent method used the plain, twill and twine techniques.

=== Plain design ===
Also known as checkerboard or diagonal weave, the plain design involves simple plaiting of one weft strand in and out over one warp strand and under the next. Sometimes the weave varies when making baskets by passing the weft over two, under two, or over one, under two. This weave is mainly used in the construction of cedar bark and rush mats, and other coarse materials.

=== Twill ===
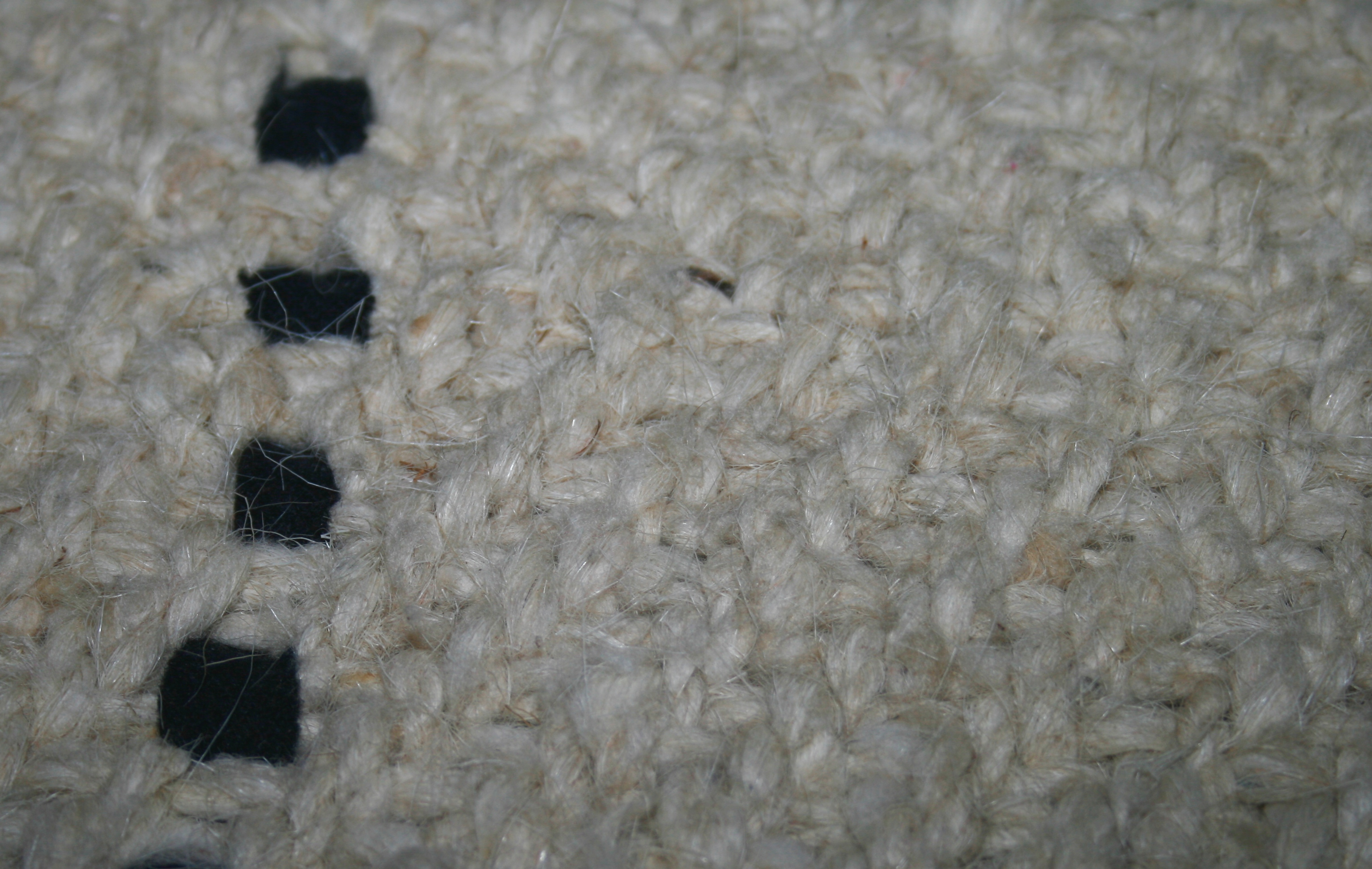
An example of the twill weave pattern from a blanket in the collection of the Simon Fraser University Museum of Archaeology and Ethnology

This type of weave is used in the production of the largest blanket styles. The warp and weft are usually of the same material. The weft crosses the warp over two, under two, or over two, under one. At the edge the weft is turned back and woven across in the opposite direction. The order of crossing the warp is changed as each line is woven - it is stepped along one warp, but the system of over two, under one is continued throughout the weave.

=== Twine ===
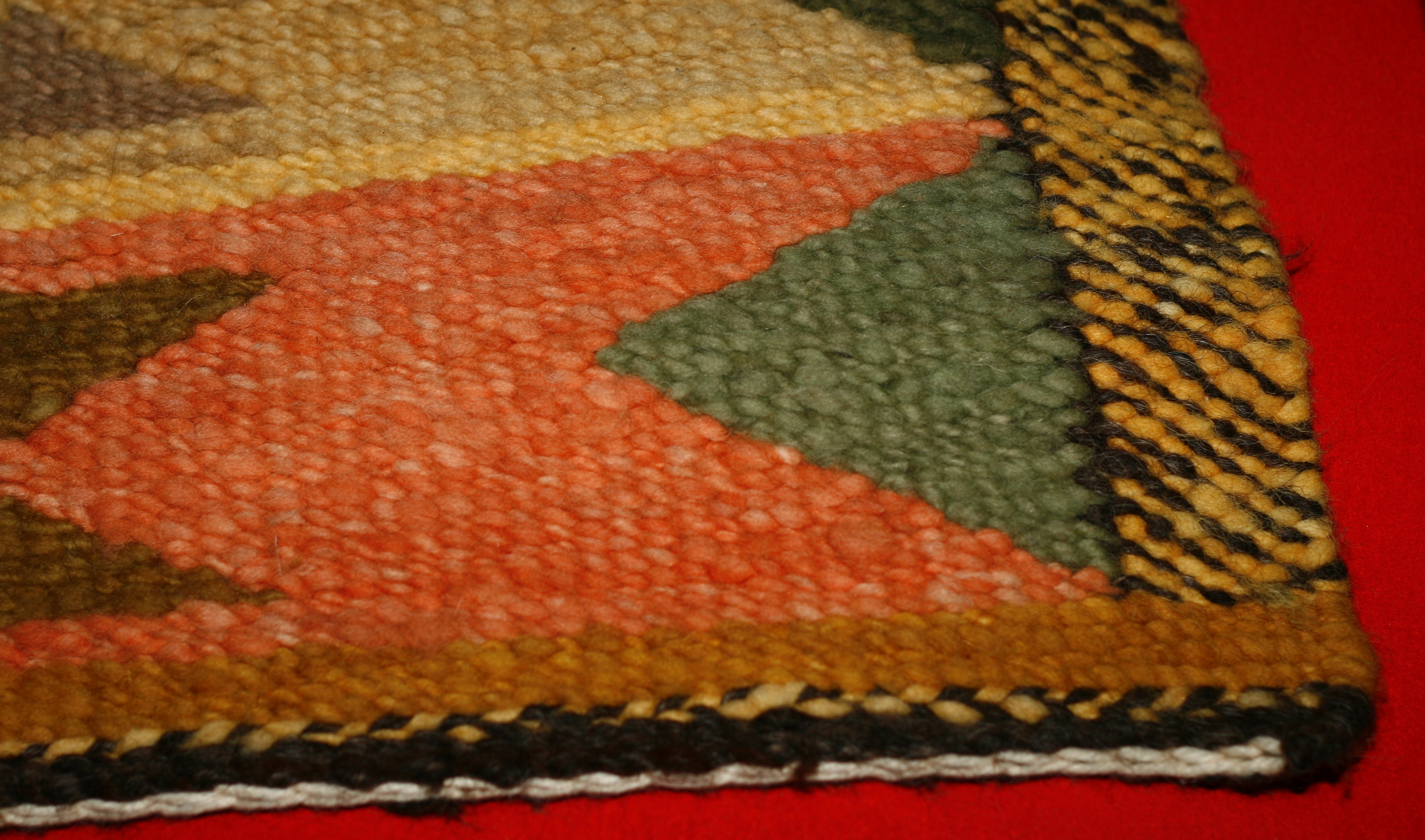
An example of the twine weave pattern from a blanket in the collection of the Simon Fraser University Museum of Archaeology and Ethnology

Twining is a type of weave and its modification double twined and two and three strand twining are used in many of the finest pieces of Salish weaving. The design produced is similar on both sides of the web. The warp is completely covered and can be of a different material.

== Materials ==
The Salish people choosing weaving materials that grew abundantly in their local environment. Archaeological excavations done in the area have uncovered extensive amounts of basketry and fibers, revealing which materials were used historically.

=== Mountain goat's wool ===
The Salish used mountain goat wool as the main source of fiber for weaving. Blankets made from goat hair were the most valuable. Originally, the Salish obtained wool high in the mountains where the mountain goats spent their summers and shed their old wool. Wool might be found caught or tangled in low bushes. During this season, they would also save wool acquired from goats killed for food. They would roll up the skin with flesh sides together and after several days, the wool would shed naturally. Then it was plucked off to be made into yarn. Before the raw fiber was spun into workable threads, it was mixed with a white chalk-like clay, absorbing the grease allowing the wool fibers to cling together. Since the 19th century, domestic sheep wool has mostly replaced mountain goat wool, which is rare and difficult to obtain.

=== Dog's hair ===
In addition to collecting mountain goat wool, the Salish kept (mostly white) woolly dogs to use their fur as weaving fibers. In a 1792 log, Captain George Vancouver wrote that "The dogs belonging to this tribe...were numerous, and resembled those Pomerania, though in general somewhat larger. They were all shorn as close to the skin as sheep are in England; and so compact were their fleeces, that large portions could be lifted up by a corner without causing any separation."

The Sto:lo people had dogs similar to a coyote, with a deep, woolly undercoat covered by a coarser long hair. The dogs were plucked for their wool, not sheared. Often the Salish would incorporate the down of waterfowl or the down of milkweed into the fiber as it was being spun into yarn.

=== Cedar bark ===
The Coast Salish had an abundant supply of cedar bark and used it for many things including clothing. The softer inner bark was used for weaving. It was made softer and pliable by boiling for periods of up to two days. They would then work the strips by bending, twisting and rubbing between their hands which were covered with protective buckskin gloves. Once it was prepared, strips were taken off to use for plaiting or open-work basket weaving. When used for clothing, the bark was first pounded into shreds then combed into small separate fibers. Then it was spun into a fine twine, or cord as required.

=== Hemp dogbane ===
Growing in many areas, Indian hemp (hemp dogbane or Apocynum cannabinum) was harvested and dried before maturity. The grass was boiled to render them soft and pliable. Whenever used for weaving, the fibers were kept moist. Indian hemp was used by the Salish speaking people near Spuzzum on the Fraser River, as a foundation warp material. On the grass warp, the blanket of soft dog's hair or mountain goat wool was woven.

=== Nettle fibre ===
Twine made from the bark of nettle stems was used extensively in the manufacture of items requiring strength through a firm, sturdy warp strand. Dried nettles were damped to make the bark sufficiently flexible, while the pith of the stem remained dry and brittle. By splitting the stem and rubbing it over a blunt edge, the bark would separate from the pith. This bark was then beaten and combed, or carded into a soft tissue which could be spun with the use of a spindle similar to the spinning of wool. Twine produced from nettle fiber was of great strength and utilized in the making of nets and fishing line, as well as for a warp in weaving.

=== Milkweed fiber ===
Twine was made from the bark of the milkweed fiber, a plant indigenous to the Thompson River area. From the bark, the finest of twine could be made, and from the seed, a soft down was obtained. Combined with goat's wool and dog hair it made for the finest fiber to weave a blanket.

=== Rushes and reeds ===
There are two types of rushes used: flat and round stemmed. Harvested for use in the late summer, the rushes were cut at or below water level then laid out on racks to dry. They were woven to make mats or bags or stripped to be used as twine cord, string and bags.

=== Willow bark ===
The inner bark was woven into many forms which held their shape and showed considerable strength and durability. Boiling it made it soft and pliable so it could be shaped.

=== Domesticated sheep wool ===
Sheep's wool is the most common material used for contemporary Salish weaving. Some knitters still buy shorn fleeces and go through most of the traditional preparation, but most buy the washed and carded wool directly from a commercial carding mill. The fleece is lightly washed in a tub of tepid water and then hung outside to dry. It is then teased or picked apart with fingers to remove any matted areas and loose dirt. The wool is then carded, leaving the wool in soft batts, where the fibers lie lengthwise. Taken to the spinning machine, the wool is deftly hand fed into the axle of the spindle. This separates sections of the batt of wool and allows the desired amount of spinning to take place before the tension is eased to wind the wool onto the spindle. When the spindle has filled, the wool is unwound and stored in balls or skeins.

== Dyeing ==
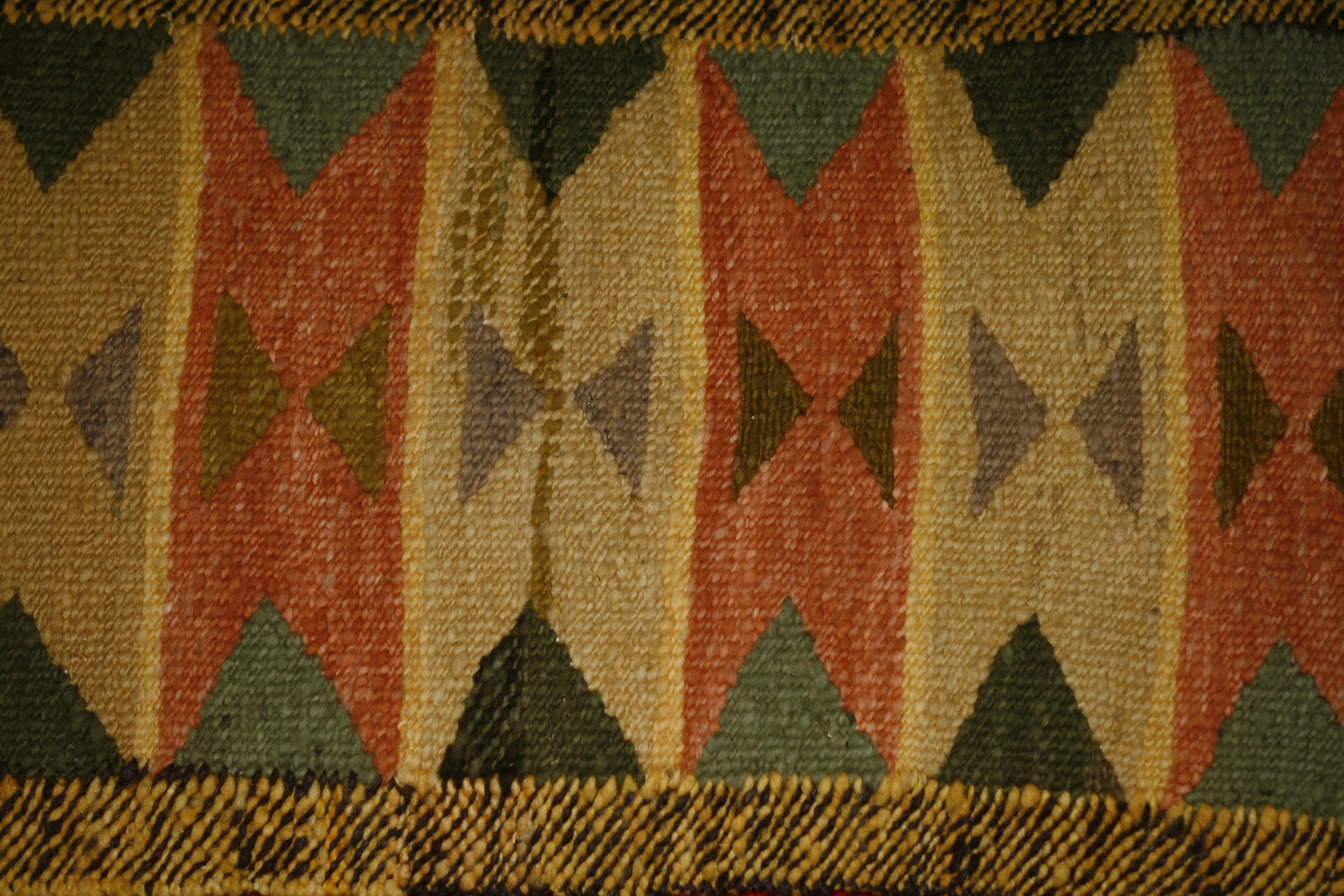
An example of a multicoloured blanket in the collection from the Simon Fraser University Museum of Archaeology and Ethnology

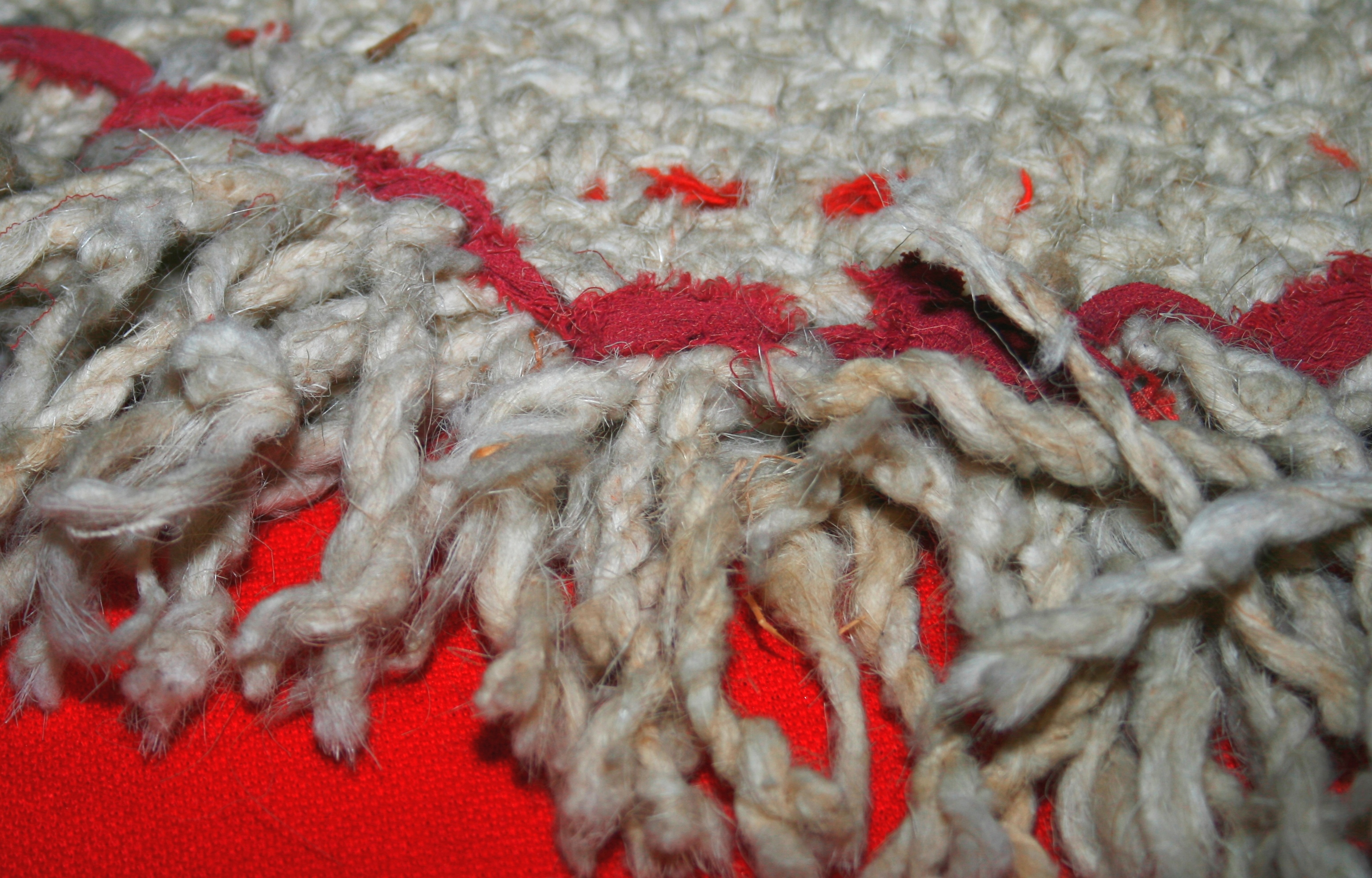
An example red fabric inclusions in a white wool blanket in the collection from the Simon Fraser University Museum of Archaeology and Ethnology

All the dyes available to the Salish originated from local plant and mineral sources. For example, red dyes were extracted from red alder or western red cedar.

The modern hand dyeing process requires the yarn to be saturated in a pot containing the color source and water already boiled together. Next the yarn would be put in a mordant bath left to simmer for over an hour. Aluminum mordant makes yellow, copper sulphate mordant makes green while ferrous sulphate/iron mordant creates a greyed look. Other mordants are chrome and tin. The final step combined the dye with the yarn and simmered for over an hour after which the dyed yarn was removed, rinsed and left to dry.

Some red inclusions, found in some blankets, may be made of wool fabric and were used by the Salish weavers in the last quarter of the 1800s. Strips were torn from imported blankets or other materials and used in weaving. It is likely that the introduction of these foreign materials into the weaving was based on colour; strips of richly dyed fabric are common in the later plain or solid style Salish blankets while brightly coloured commercial yarns are included in many of the decorative blankets. In most cases the introduced fabric strips and yarns use colours not available through native plant or mineral dyes.

== Spinning process ==
Preparing the fiber was an extensive process that involved cleaning and teasing the fiber, spinning the yarn and plying it, dyeing the coloured yarns, and lastly weaving. Creating the yarn was done with a shank which is usually 2–3 ft. long and holds the stone or preferably whalebone whorl. The spindle is rotated by striking the lower side of the whorl with the right hand, while the upper end of the shank is held between the thumb and forefinger of the other hand, and the lower end rests on the ground. Using the spindle the two strands of yarn are twisted round each other into a single thread. Goat hair was always spun “s” meaning that the whorl would be turned counterclockwise in spinning. As goat hair was always made into two-ply yarn, the doubled yarn would have been spun by attaching two lengths of single –ply "s" spun yarn and then turning the whorl clockwise in a "z" twist.

The objective of weaving a blanket was not only to create something functional but also meaningful and symbolic. An example is the zigzag design found in many of the Salish blankets. The pattern is more than aesthetic and could represent such things as a trail, lightning or a snake.

Fran James (Lummi, 1924–2013) and Bill James (Lummi, 1944–2020)

== Tools ==
=== Coast Salish technology ===
The Coast Salish loom is formed with two vertical posts that support two horizontal bars about 6 ft in length. On these horizontal bars the blankets are woven and adjusted on the vertical posts for variations in size. The warp is wrapped around the horizontal bar and held tight during the weaving process.

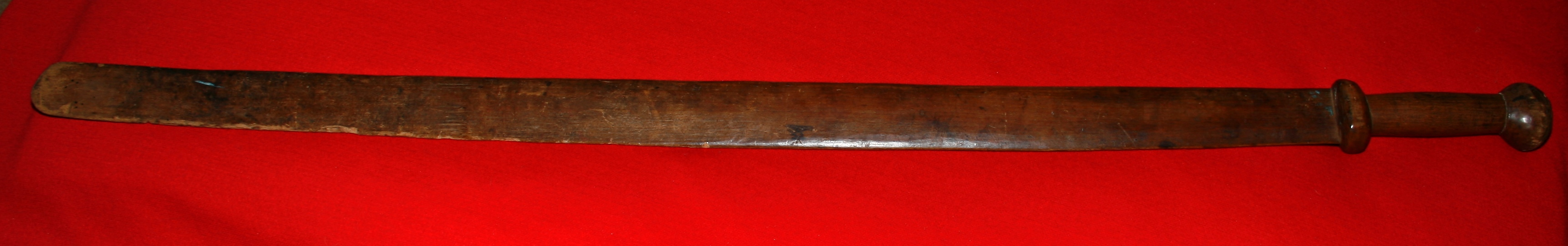
Wooden baton used during the weaving process from the collection of the Simon Fraser University Museum of Archaeology and Ethnology

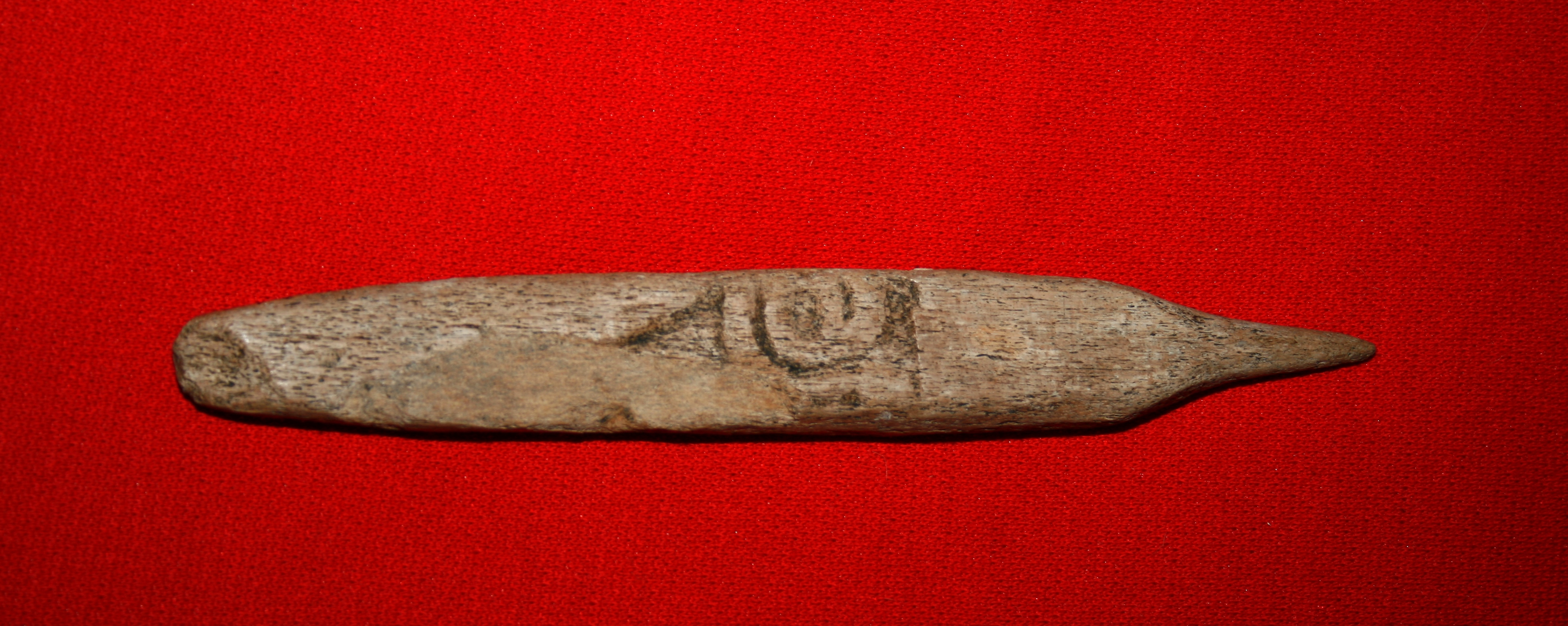
A carved bone shuttle used during the weaving process in the collection of the Simon Fraser University Museum of Archaeology and Ethnology

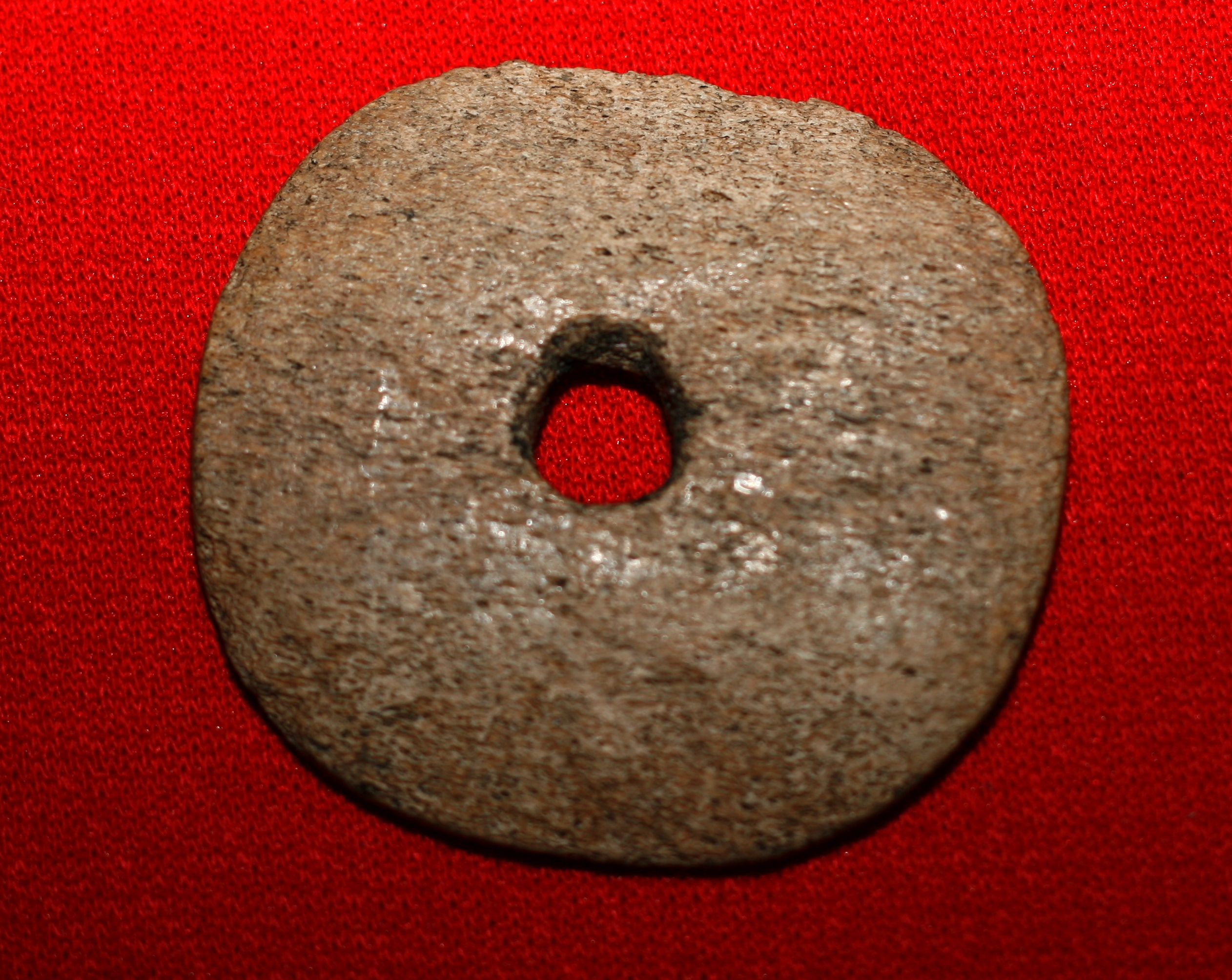
A bone spindle whorl used during the spinning process in the collection of the Simon Fraser University Museum of Archaeology and Ethnology

== Legacy ==
In 1884, a Canadian law was passed banning religious practices of the First Nations people as part of an attempt by the colonizers to forcibly assimilate the Indigenous population. This law stayed in force until the 1920s. The important potlatch ceremony was included in this ban. In addition to these laws, colonizers also brought with them their own wool blankets, most famously the off-white Hudson's Bay Company blankets, which featured red, yellow and green stripes. Because of their quick production time, these HBC blankets were as much as 20 times cheaper than the traditional Salish blankets. Traditional goat-hair blankets were valued at 20 times the Hudson Bay blankets because of their better material and more labour-intensive production.

Coast Salish blanket weaving declined in the early 20th century. As blanket weaving declined, Salish women began to adopt the practice of knitting sweaters and other garments. These sweaters, known as "Cowichan" after the Vancouver Island Salish community, were made with sheep's wool obtained from the settlers. The form was the traditional European cardigan sweater, but the designs knitted into the garment were such Salish motifs as eagles and whales. While these knitted garments did not have the same ceremonial or symbolic importance as the woven blankets, they were nonetheless worn during notable civic and religious events.

== See also ==
- Coast Salish art
- Salish Weavers Guild
