= Salish Wool Dog =

Extinct North American dog breed

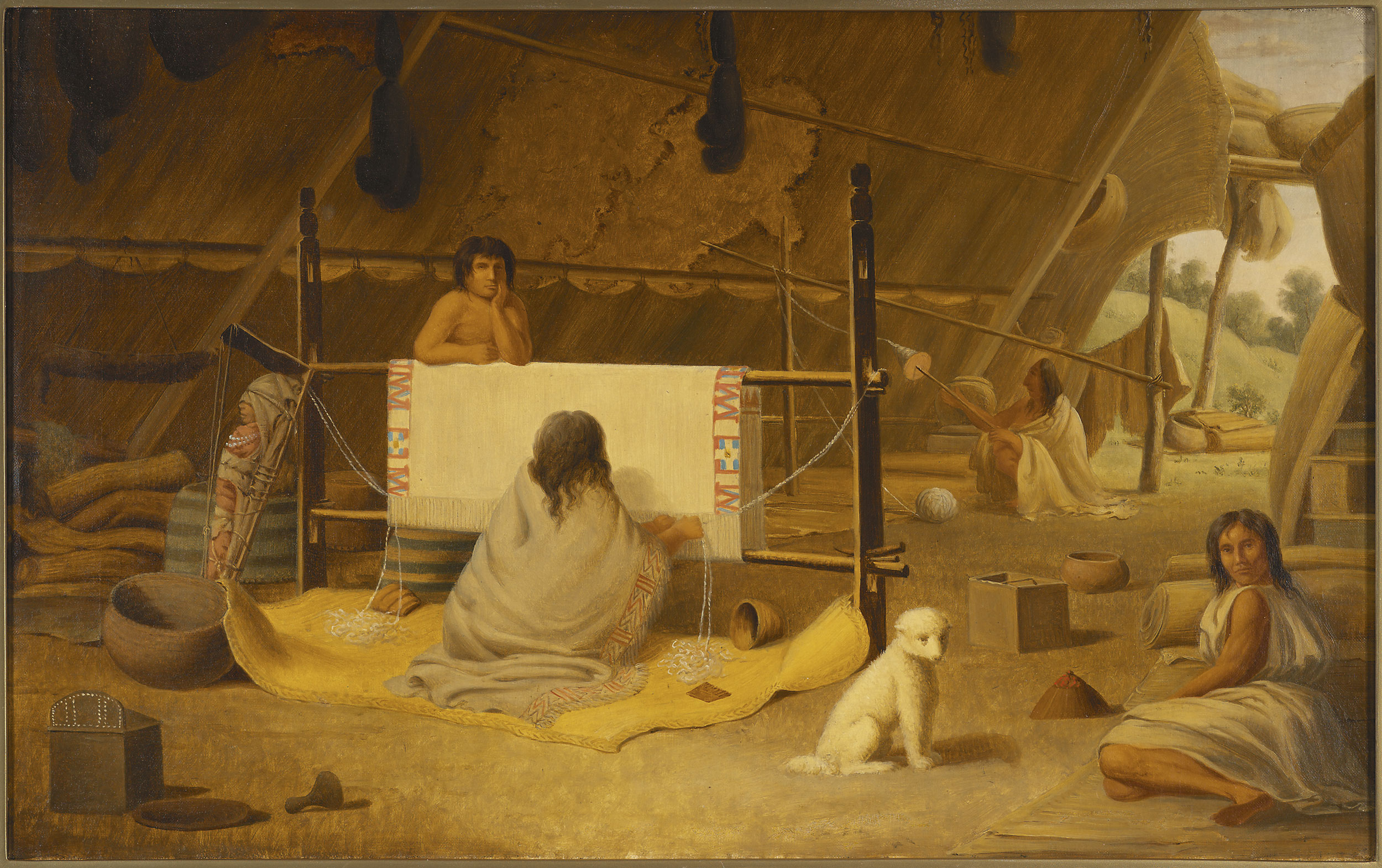
- A Salish Wool Dog in a 19th-century painting of Coast Salish weaving
- Origin: Washington state and British Columbia
- Breed status: Extinct

The Salish Wool Dog, also known as the Comox dog or Clallam Indian Dog, is an extinct breed of white, long-haired, Spitz-type dog that was developed and bred by the Coast Salish peoples of what is now Washington state and British Columbia for textile production.

== History ==
The remains of dogs that are a morphological match for the Salish wool dog have been found in archeological sites in Coastal Salish territory dating to ~5,000 years ago. The small, long-haired wool dog and the coyote-like village dogs were deliberately maintained as separate populations. The dogs were kept in packs of about 12 to 20 animals, and fed primarily raw and cooked salmon. To keep the breed true to type and the preferred white color, Salish Wool Dogs were confined on islands.

Salish peoples, renowned for their weaving and knitting, did not raise sheep, and while mountain goat fur was also used to create wool textiles, mountain goats were wild, and thus their fur could only be collected from mountain goats leaving fur in the environment, such as from shedding, or collected from skins of hunted goats. The Salish Wool Dog was prized as a consistent, domesticated source of high-quality wool.

The dogs were sheared like sheep in May or June. In an account by George Vancouver, it was said that the sheared fur was so thick that he could pick up a corner and the whole fleece would hold together. The dog hair was frequently mixed with mountain goat wool, feathers, and plant fibers to change the yarn quality and to extend the supply of fiber.

A 1806 letter from Meriwether Lewis to Simon Fraser reveals early explorers began buying Salish wool dogs from Coast Salish communities to eat, eventually growing "extremely fond" of their meat, a fact which remained remembered by the descendants of native peoples encountered by the men. Ethnographer George Gibbs received a pelt during the Northwest Boundary Survey in 1859. The specimen was rediscovered in the National Museum of Natural History's collection independently by ecologist Russel Barsh (working on behalf of the Samish Tribe) and historian Candace Wellman in 2001 and 2002. Genomic samples of the specimen's DNA revealed that Salish wool dogs diverged from other breeds as much as 5,000 years ago.

=== Decline ===
During the 1800s, the use of dog wool declined and the breed became extinct by the late 1800s or early 1900s. Some sources report the primary cause had been economic, since Hudson's Bay Company blankets were cheaply available in exchange for otter pelts. Other sources, particularly oral histories, point to suppression of Indigenous culture as the ultimate cause of the wool dog's decline. Traditional Coast Salish weaving—and, by extension, the wool dogs—were heavily discouraged by colonial authorities. One Stó꞉lō elder described how her great-grandmother "had to get rid of the dogs" after authorities forbade Salish cultural practices.

=== Genomic history ===
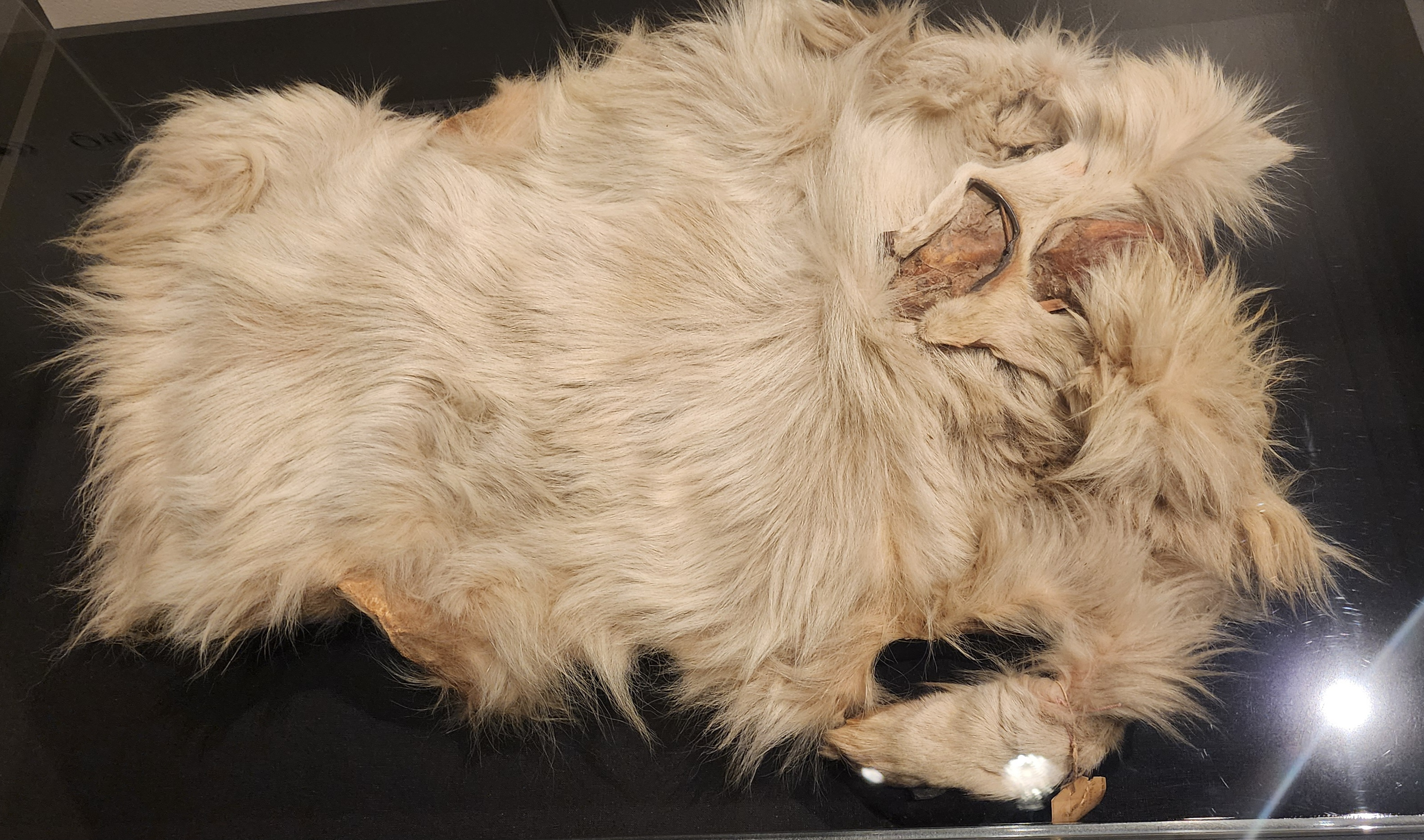
Pelt of Mutton, a Salish Wool Dog who died in 1859.

The only known fur of the extinct Salish wool dog belongs to "Mutton" a specimen that lived near the end of the traditional breeding of wool dogs and was accompanied by naturalist and ethnographer George Gibbs during the Northwest Boundary Survey (1857-1862). Its fur and skeletal material are housed at the Smithsonian Institution (USNM 4762). Stable isotope analyses (δ^{13}C and δ^{15}N) conducted on bone collagen and hair keratin revealed low isotopic levels in Mutton’s tissues compared with other ancient dogs from the Pacific Northwest coast. This suggests a diet largely devoid of marine foods and primarily based on terrestrial resources, such as grains and animals (pigs, cows, etc). These findings align with the inland journeys that Mutton undertook with Gibbs across the elevated mountainous terrain of the Cascade Mountains and the Columbia Plateau.

Comparison of Mutton's mitochondrial genome with that of ancient and modern dogs has shown that the closest neighboring A2b haplotype to Mutton's corresponds to an ancient dog (~1,500 BP) from indigenous societies of the Pacific Northwest, similarly a set of ancient and modern dogs (~620 BP) from Alaska form a clade with Mutton's group, evidencing the deep roots of their ancestry in the region and their relationship to a common mitochondrial ancestor (~4,776 -1,853 years BP). Statistical analyses of genomic data (D-, outgroup-f3 and f4-ratio statistics) revealed that Mutton shared substantially greater genetic drift with precolonial dogs. Specifically, f4-ratio tests estimated that 84% of its ancestry was predominantly precolonial, whereas 16% corresponded to introduced European dogs. Similarly, the sequencing of its nuclear genome (3.4x coverage) demonstrated low global heterozygosity compared with other modern and ancient breeds. Furthermore, analyses of runs of homozygosity (ROH) revealed that a significant percentage of Mutton's genome (15.7%) contained long ROH (≥2.5 Mbp). This reduced genetic variability reflects the strict management of selective breeding practices for the Salish wool dog over time, aimed at preventing hybridization with introduced dogs and preserving its unique coat characteristics.

Additionally, a dN/dS analysis of the coding regions in Mutton's genome compared with other dogs identified 125 genes as candidates for positive selection in Salish wool dogs. These genes exhibited high nonsynonymous mutation rates in Mutton (dN/dS_{Genome} ≥ 1.5) but lacked nonsynonymous mutations (dN = 0) in three other dogs, including a precolonial dog. Within this group of genes specific to the Salish wool dog lineage are those associated with the formation of extracellular matrix components (PRDM5, HAPLN1); hair follicle development (KANK2, KRT77, PCOLCE2); and skin development (CERS3, GPNMB). In all cases, Mutton displayed conservation of an ancestral allele, revealing that the unique phenotype of the Salish wool dog originated independently from other breeds.

Together, these genomic analyses, coupled with historical records and traditional knowledge, provide evidence of the efforts of ancestral Coast Salish societies to preserve the unique genetic makeup and phenotype of the Salish wool dog against the gene flow of dogs introduced by settlers. They also revealed that this race was present in Coast Salish society approximately 5,000 years before European colonization.

== Osteometry ==
- Skull total length: 162.0 mm (6.38 in)
- Condylobasal skull length: 154.6 mm (6.09 in)
- Femur GL: 154.3 mm (6.07 in)
- Tibia GL: 150.0 mm (5.91 in)
- Humerus GL: 143.5 mm (5.65 in)
- Radius GL: 136.0 mm (5.35 in)
- Ulna GL: 157.5 mm (6.20 in)
- Shoulder height of standing dog: 44 cm (17 in)

== Cultural significance of textiles to Coast Salish peoples ==
Beyond their practical uses, woolen blankets, such as those that were made from fur of the Coast Salish Dog while it was alive, are of significant social, cultural, economic, and spiritual significance to the Salish peoples. Traditionally, women were in charge of making the blankets. Young girls were trained by their grandmothers as early as ten years of age, with more intense training at puberty. Weaving blankets required serious commitment and could take long periods of time to complete. Additionally, they were often associated with spiritual tasks or rituals such as abstinence. According to the Salish origin story, women were taught how to weave by the dogs themselves. The blankets represented an individual's wealth and were often given away to members of the community or even other villages to show prosperity, such as during the potlatch ceremony and public gathering, and were also used as a currency for which other goods could be purchased or bartered.

Traditionally and contemporaneously, certain kinds of ceremonial blankets can identify the wearer as being a civic and religious leader in the community. Honored individuals can be adorned with a blanket to distinguish them, or they would sit or stand upon their blankets so as to raise them in accordance of their honored status.

== Gallery ==
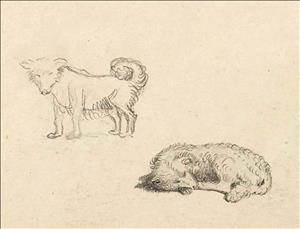
"Studies of Wool Dogs and Interior Furnishing" ca. April-June 1847 by Paul Kane (Royal Ontario Museum)

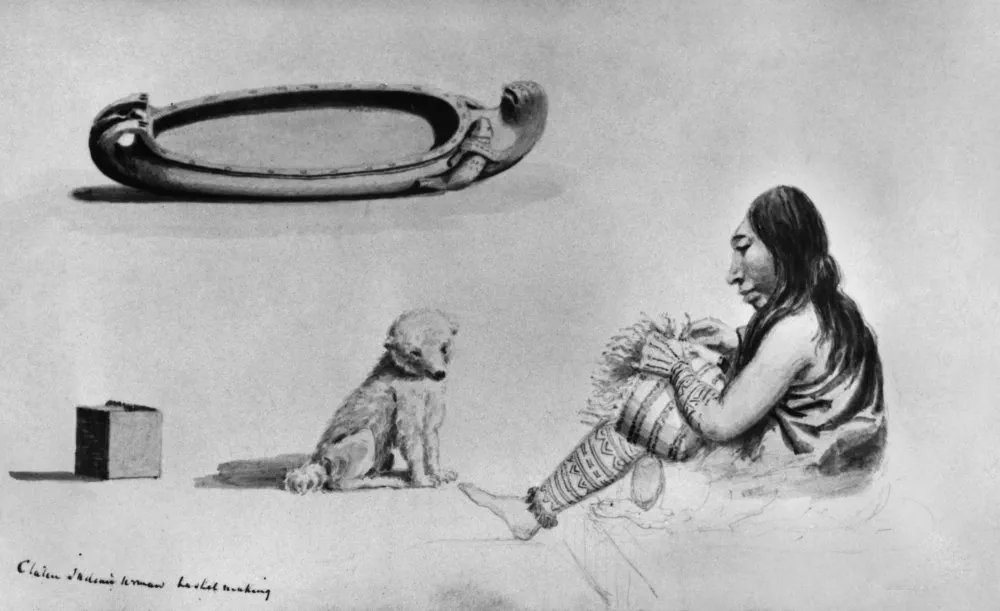
"Clallam Indian woman basket making" by Paul Kane, ca. 1847

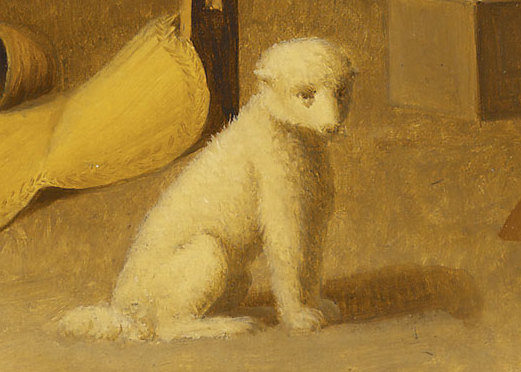
Close-up of the dog in Paul Kane's painting. "A Woman Weaving a Blanket" ca. 1849-1856 by Paul Kane (Royal Ontario Museum)

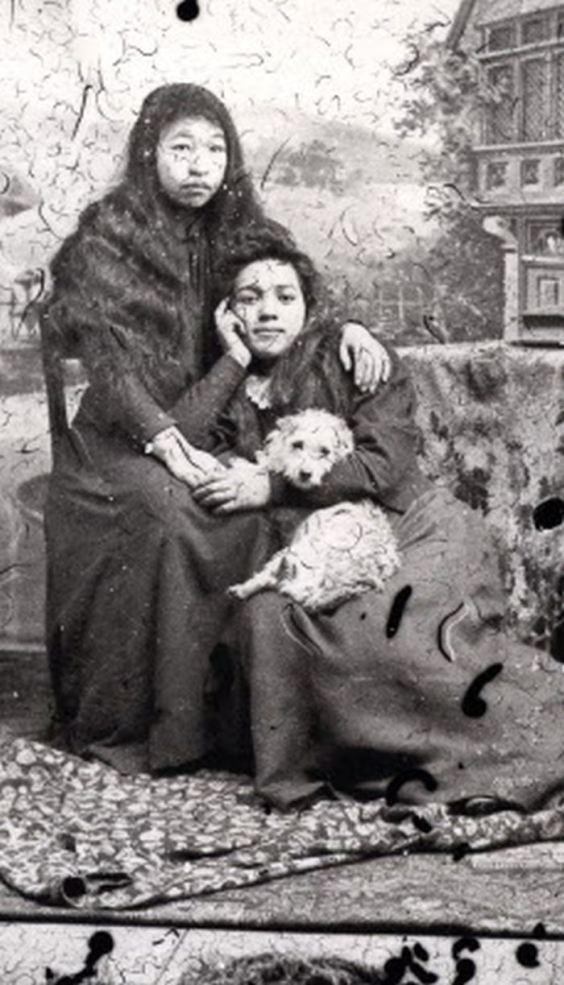
Two Coast Salish women with a dog suspected to be a mixed woolly dog. (Chilliwack Museum and Archives), before 1900

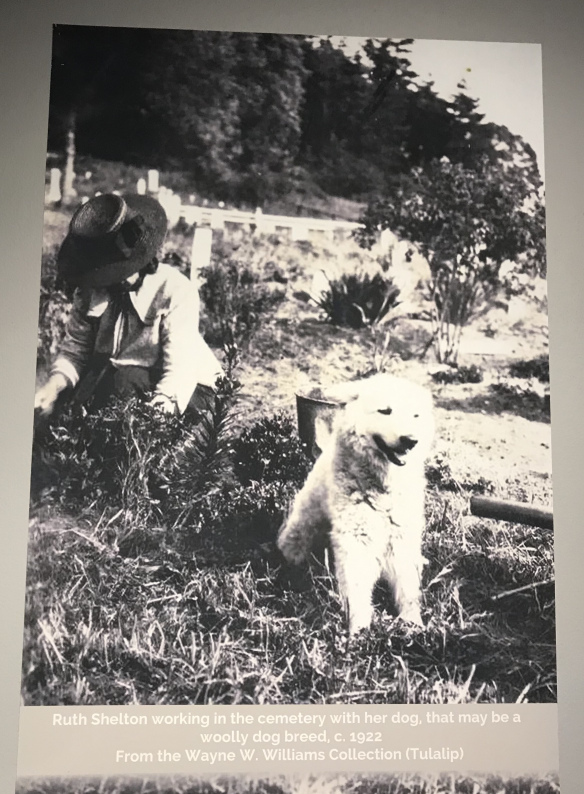
Ruth siastenu Sehome Shelton working in the Tulalip cemetery with her dog, possibly a woolly dog mix, 1922
