= Salish Weavers Guild =

The Salish Weavers Guild was created in 1971 and ended around 1990. The society had two shops located in Sardis, Chilliwack in the province of British Columbia, Canada. This guild was a formal society focused on the production and sales of local Salish Weavers from all areas of Stó:lō territory in and around the Fraser Valley. The Guild was successful in inspiring Stó:lō culture, art, education, and community and came as a result of the Coast Salish weaving revival of the 1960s.

== History ==
Oliver Wells, with the help of Stó:lō women Mary Peters from Skwah First Nation and Adeline Lorenzetto from Ohamil First Nation, are credited with the revival of Coast Salish Weaving in the Fraser Valley region. Wells and Lorenzetto re-discovered the old method of weaving by recreating an old loom and unravelling a portion of an old blanket to learn its technique. They made two blankets one with traditional mountain goat hair and the other with sheep's wool. Meanwhile, while Wells believed that the weaving was no longer being practiced, Mary Peters was creating traditional Salish weavings with the use of knowledge passed down to her by her mother. She was known in her community as an individual who, “[knew] everything, because she never went to school.” After Wells had approached Mary, she and Adeline continued to weave during their free time for the next couple of years with many others eventually joining them.

The Salish Weaver's Guild was officially formed in 1971, a year after the passing of Oliver Wells. The society formed in part because the women wanted to continue their weaving business in a formal way and to qualify for federal government funding. With encouragement and collaboration with Well's wife Sara and his daughter Marie Weeden, the Salish Weavers continued their business, now with the label of ‘Guild’. Through this formal structure the society sought to open a store and maintain a method of bookkeeping to manage the individuals' labour and expenses.

== Business ==
By the time of the shop's opening, each member of the guild had a cooperative role in creating weavings. Some participants would spin the wool that another member has already carded, while other members would be responsible for dyeing. By the time a weaving was complete, it was possible that four or five different individuals had been involved in its production. Most of this work was completed in the weaver's homes in the company of family and without the distractions of the shop.

The Salish Weavers business relied heavily on the word of mouth of satisfied customers to draw in new business. However, certain methods in advertising also brought attention to the business and thus increased sales. One particular method was through magazine and newspaper publications. Like the 1966 publication by Oliver Wells, in The Beaver, these articles brought the national and worldwide attention of buyers. The society had publications in magazines such as, 'Western Homes and Living, Canadian Homes, and Beautiful British Columbia magazine. Through the magazine publications, more attention was brought to the women's work, which ultimately promoted sales. Many of these sales would come in the form of commissions in which a certain weaver would be requested or a specific order with design and size would be requested from the buyer. To help spread their name, the Salish Weavers began to brand their work by attaching tags on the weaving with the society's name and logo. The emblem of the Salish Weaver's Guild, was The Flying Goose. The Flying Goose represents the resurrection of weaving and the “old ways” because Canada geese always return to the place of the birth on the Coqualeetza grounds as part of a seasonal cycle. Another form of advertising was through postcards. In 1971 the society ordered six thousand postcards for the purpose of advertising. These postcards were sold at all locations in the Chilliwack area that handled postcards.

The role of family was important in all aspects of weaving for the guild. Not only did younger people learn to weave from their elders, others were involved in the production. Often husbands would build looms for their wives and children would help with the processing of the wool.

== Community ==
The Salish Weavers Guild ultimately brought people together, regardless of where they were from or what particular community they were members of, to work towards a same goal. The Salish Weavers Guild promoted community on all levels. One particular way was through the Chilliwack community. Every year that the guild operated, members would attend and host exhibitions. The Edenbank farm had an exhibition in the summer where weavers would display their work and demonstrate spinning and weaving. Similarly, there was the Annual Chilliwack fair where the women would enter contests and sell their products. The gathering of individuals and families from various Stó:lō communities, as a result of the Salish Weavers Guild, created community and camaraderie within the Stó:lō Nation itself.

Indigenous women's organizations such as the Salish Weaver's Guild were central to the health and healing of First Nations communities in the latter half of the 20th century.
