= Chelan people =

Indigenous people of the Northwest United States

Chelan
Regions with significant populations
- United States (Washington)

Languages
- English, Salishan, Interior Salish

Related ethnic groups
- Colville, Nespelem, Sanpoil, Sinixt, Palus, Wenatchi, Entiat, Methow, Southern Okanagan (Sinkaietk), Sinkiuse-Columbia, and the Nez Perce of Chief Joseph's band

The Chelan (/ʃəˈlæn/ shə-LAN) are an Interior Salish people speaking the Wenatchi dialect, though separate from that tribe. The name derives from the traditional Wenatchi name Tsi-Laan meaning "deep water".

The Chelan were historically located at the outlet of Lake Chelan in the U.S. state of Washington, where they spent the winter months. The Chelan Native Americans are thought to have splintered off from the Wenatchi tribe.

== Territory ==
Lake Chelan is 51.5 miles (82.9 km) long and .75 to 2.1 miles wide, and is the third-deepest freshwater lake in the United States and the ninth-deepest in the world with a maximum depth of 1,486 feet (453 m). Fed by streams from the Cascade Range, the lake flows into the Columbia River from the Chelan River.

During the salmon runs, they fished the outlet where the lake meets the river and also moved down to the Wenatshapam Fishery on the Columbia River to fish and trade with other tribes.

The Chelan tribe also had several permanent villages in the lower Chelan valley. One at Willow Point, near Manson, had up to 500 occupants. Another on Wapato Point was home to about 100 people. Many groups lived from Field's Point to the First Creek drain into the lake (now a WA State Park), the Watson's Resort, Granite Falls, Sunnybank drainage, Minneapolis Beach, Laferties Landing or Resort, and the area referred to as Lakeside. They were frequently on the move, traveling in and out of the mountains with the seasons, collecting plants, fishing small streams, and hunting game.

The watery highway of Lake Chelan provided a relatively easy transportation route from the Columbia River deep into the Cascades. Occasionally, to trade with or visit coastal relatives, the Chelans would canoe up to the head of the lake where they knew of a route that followed a swift stream between high peaks.

Crossing between the glaciers and cliffs on the crest of the mountains, they descended through the tall forests to the land of the Upper and Lower Skagit tribes. The Chelan Indians often traded mountain goat wool for dried clams and salmon, or for seashells, which they used for future trade or ornamentation.

Their traditional allies were the kindred Wenatchi, Sinkiuse-Columbia, and Entiat. Their traditional enemies were Shoshone, Kwalhioqua (also known as Willapa who lived in the hills north of the lower Columbia River), the Blackfoot Confederacy, and Nez Perce at times, at others they were allies.

Territorial boundaries shifted frequently in the Plateau Region, as tribes competed for the best hunting grounds. After the arrival of the horse, Plateau tribes faced more competition from the Plains Indians and Indians from the Great Basin. Intertribal war in the area faded out as alliances were made to fight their common enemies.

By the 1860s, smallpox epidemics had virtually ended tribal warfare, due to the drastic decrease in population. From 1840 onward, the US government tried to move all Indians to reservations. The resulting wars between the 1840s to the 1870s were the final push to colonize these land.

== Ethnography ==
The Chelan Indian tribe are members of the Confederated Tribes of the Colville Reservation, which is recognized by the United States of America as an American Indian Tribe. It is located on the Colville Indian Reservation in eastern Washington state. The Confederated Tribes have over 9,000 descendants from 12 aboriginal tribes. In addition to the Chelan, the tribes are known, in English, as the Colville, the Nespelem, the Sanpoil, the Sinixt (Arrow Lakes people), the Palus, the Wenatchi, the Entiat, the Methow, the Southern Okanagan (Sinkaietk), the Sinkiuse-Columbia (Moses-Columbia), the Nez Perce of Chief Joseph's band, and the Wapato's.

The Chelan speak English. The native language of the tribe is a Salishan language made up of several different dialects among the tribes.
