= Confederated Tribes of the Colville Reservation =

Federally recognized tribe in Washington, US

The Confederated Tribes of the Colville Reservation (Okanagan: sx̌ʷy̓ʔiłpx sqlxʷúlaʔxʷ) is the federally recognized tribe that controls the Colville Indian Reservation, which is located in northeastern Washington, United States. It is the government for its people, who are Interior Salish peoples.

The Confederate Tribes of the Colville Reservation consist of twelve individual tribes. Those tribes are:

- Arrow Lakes (Lakes, Sinixt)
- Chelan
- Colville
- Entiat
- Nespelem
- Okanagan
- Methow
- Sinkiuse-Columbia
- Nez Perce
- Palus
- San Poil
- Wenatchi

The tribes' traditional territories in the Pacific Northwest once encompassed most of what is now known as eastern Washington state and extended into British Columbia, Idaho, and Oregon. A number of the bands are the namesake of rivers that flow off the North Cascades or the Okanogan Highlands. Several of the rivers have small towns or communities near where the rivers flow into the Columbia River. The rivers, in order from furthest downstream to upstream, are the: Wenatchee, Entiat, Chelan, Methow, Okanogan, Nespelem, Sanpoil (Tribal community of Sanpoil, on the Sanpoil arm of Lake Roosevelt), and Colville. The Arrow Lakes are also upstream on the Columbia River, past the border into British Columbia.

The Nez Perce are the descendants of Chief Joseph's band, who were forcibly displaced from their territory in a violation of the Treaty of Walla Walla. This resulted in the Nez Perce War. After the band's surrender, they were relocated to the Colville reservation. The rest of the Nez Perce are located on the Nez Perce Indian Reservation in West central Idaho along the Clearwater River.

In 1872, the Confederated Tribes of the Colville Reservation was formed by executive order under President Ulysses S. Grant for the purpose of occupying the Colville Reservation. It was a large area encompassing a wide variety of habitats and resources. The reservation was later reduced, and some of the best lands were reallocated for settlement by European Americans.

== Notable tribal members ==
- Lucy Covington (1910–1982, Moses-Columbia), Native American Rights Activist
- Mourning Dove (author) (1888–1936, Okanagan), Native American writer
- Joe Feddersen (b. 1953, Okanagan), sculptor, painter, photographer, and mixed-media artist
- Chief Moses (1829–1899, Moses-Columbia), Native American Chief
- Lawney Reyes (1951–2022, Sinixt), artist, author, activist
- Luana Reyes (1933–2001, Sinixt), health care activist and educator
- Stella Runnels (1918–2010), nurse and activist who established the health clinic during the Occupation of Alcatraz.
- Bernie Whitebear (1937–2000, Sinixt), Native American rights activist

== See also ==
- Indigenous peoples of the Northwest Plateau
