= Interior Salish peoples =

Indigenous peoples of Western Canada and the United States

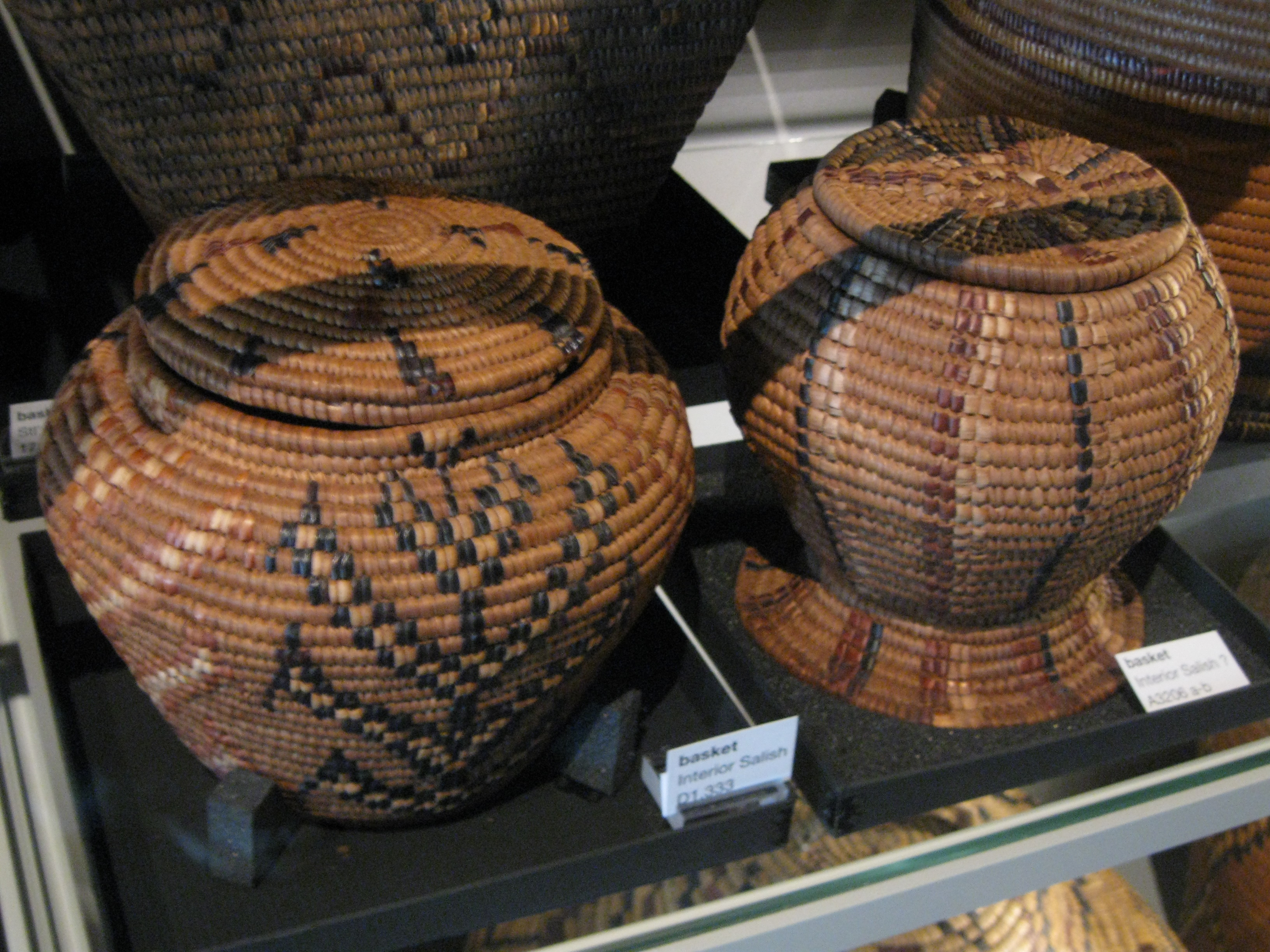
- Two Interior Salish coiled baskets with lids at the Museum of Anthropology at UBC.

Regions with significant populations
- British Columbia, Washington, Idaho, and Montana

Languages
- Interior Salish languages, English

Religion
- Indigenous religion, Christianity

Related ethnic groups
- Coast Salish peoples

Map of Salishan languages. Interior Salish territories are in olive green and yellow.

Interior Salish peoples are Indigenous peoples of the Northwest Plateau, who are centered in south British Columbia in Canada and northeastern Washington, northern Idaho, and western Montana in the United States. They speak Interior Salish languages, a branch of the Salishan language phylum. Salish language–speaking peoples to the West are the Coast Salish peoples. To the south are Sahaptian language–speaking tribes, especially the Nez Perce.

Historically, Interior Salish peoples had seasonal settlements to fish, hunt, and gather abundant wild plants. In the winter, they lived in round, semi-subterranean pit houses with thatched roofs. In summer, they built conical homes from tule reed (Schoenoplectus acutus) mats. Villages were politically autonomous.

Interior Salish peoples did not encounter Europeans until 1793, when Scottish-Canadian explorer Alexander Mackenzie entered Secwepemc territory. Canadian explorer and fur trader Simon Fraser met several Interior Salish peoples when traveling down the Fraser River in 1808. After contact, Interior Salish peoples adopted some cultural traits from Indigenous peoples of the Great Basin and Northern Plains to their south and west, but not linguistic traits.

In the 1870s, Canada established several Indian reserves for Interior Salish peoples that were a fraction of their historical homelands in British Columbia. The Interior Salish First Nations have fought to reclaim their lands ever since.

== Northern ==
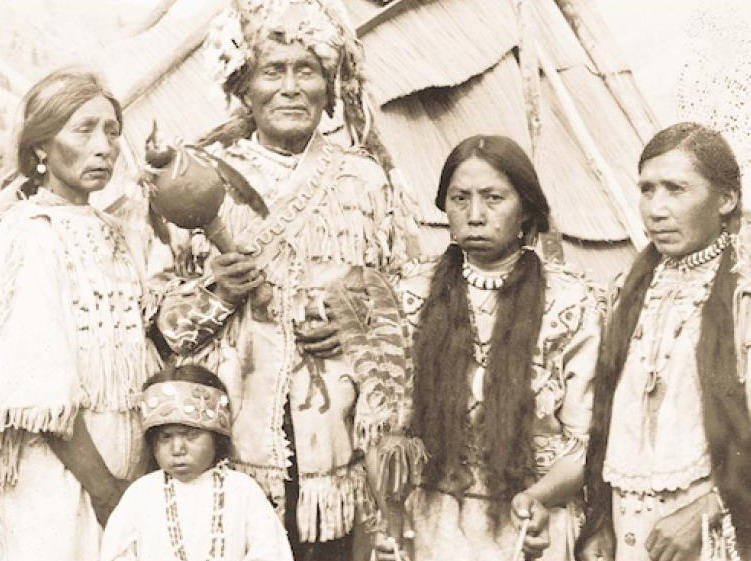
Members of a Nlaka’pamux community, 1914

There are three Northern Interior Salish languages: Shuswap, Lillooet, and Thompson. Indigenous peoples speaking Northern Interior Salishan languages are located in southwestern BC:

- Secwepemc (secwépemc), also known as Shuswap
  - Fraser River Division
  - Canyon Division
  - Lake Division (styétemc)
  - North Thompson (simpcwemc)
  - Kamloops Division (stk̓emlúpsemc)
  - Bonaparte Division
- Stʼatʼimc (St̓át̓imc), also known as Lillooet
  - Upper Lillooet (St̓át̓imc)
    - Lakes Lillooet
    - Fraser River Lillooet
  - Lower Lillooet (Lil̓wat)
    - Mount Currie Lillooet
    - Lilloet River Lillooet
- Nlaka'pamux (nɬeʔképmx), also known as the Thompson or Thompson (River) Salish
  - Upper Thompson
    - Nicola (cw̓éxmx)
    - Spences Bridge (nk̓əmcínmx)
    - Upper Fraser (sƛ̕exéyxʷ)
    - Lytton (nɬeʔképmx)
  - Lower Thompson

== Southern ==
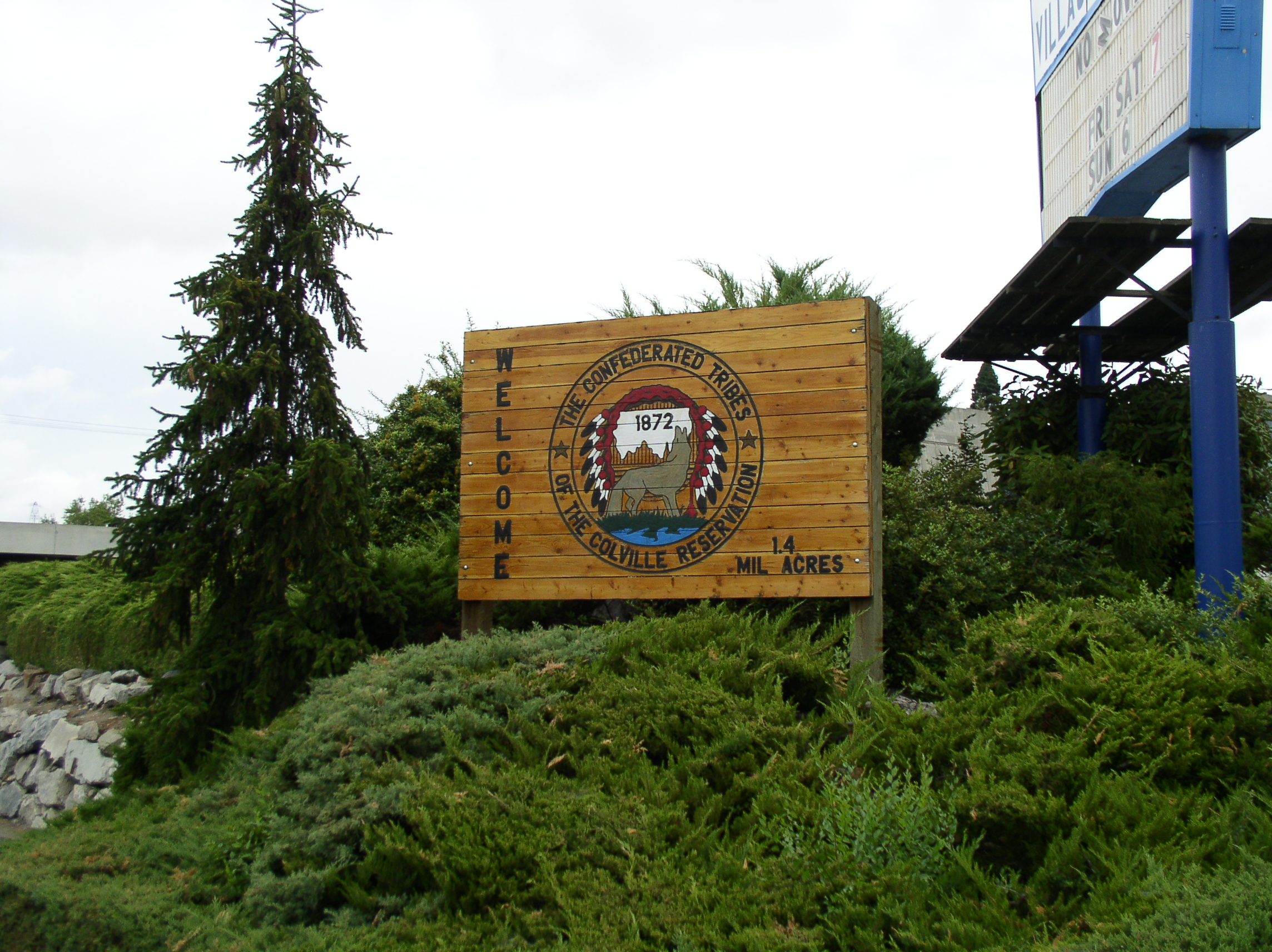
Sign welcoming visitors to the Colville Indian Reservation, Washington

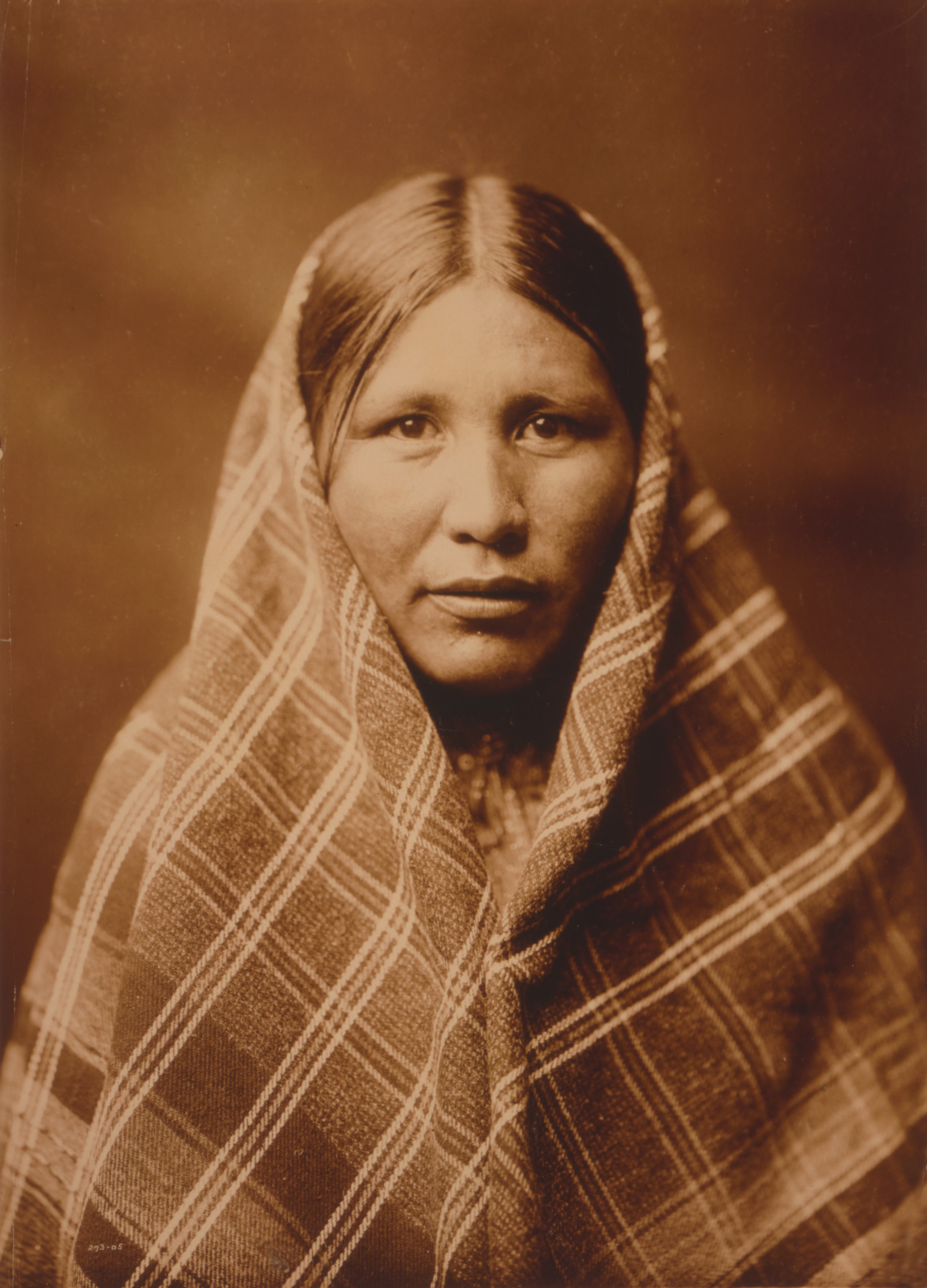
Nespelem woman, Washington, 1911

There are four languages belonging to the Southern branch of Interior Salish: Okanagan, Columbian, Kalispel, and Cour d'Alene.

Peoples speaking the Okanagan language (a.k.a. Colville-Okanagan or Nsyilxcən):

- Sinixt (snʕay̓ckstx), also known as the Arrow Lakes Band or the Lakes Band, southwestern BC and northeastern WA
- Colville (sx̌ʷy̓iɬpx), northeastern WA and southwestern BC
- Syilx (suknaqínx), also known as the Okanagan, southwestern BC, northeastern WA
  - Northern Okanagan
  - Southern Okanagan
- Methow, eastern WA (Note: Some classifications describe the Methow as speaking Columbian, rather than Okanagan)
- Nespelem (nspilm), eastern WA
- Sanpoil (snpʕʷil̕xx), eastern WA

Peoples speaking the Columbian language (a.k.a. Columbia-Moses, Moses-Columbia, Columbia-Wenatchi) are all located in northeastern WA:

- Sinkayuse (škwáxčənəxʷ), also known as the Moses-Columbia
- Chelan (ščəl̕ámxəxʷ)
- Entiat (šnt̓iyátkʷəxʷ)
- Wenatchi (šnp̍əšqʷáw̓šəxʷ)

Peoples speaking the Kalispel language (a.k.a. Salish, Montana Salish, Salish-Spokane-Kalispel):

- Spokane, northeastern WA
  - Lower Spokane (scqesciɬni)
  - Middle Spokane (snxʷmeneʔ)
  - Upper Spokane (sntuʔtʔulixʷ)
- Pend d'Oreille (qlispé), also known as the Kalispel, (Note: The terms "Pend d'Oreille" (various spellings) and "Kalispel" have historically been used in overlapping ways to refer to the same subgroups, distinct subgroups, or the whole nation (Lahren 1998, p. 296)) northeastern WA, northern ID, western MT
  - Kalispel (qlispé), also known as the Lower Pend d'Oreille or Lower Kalispel, on the Pend Oreille and Clark Fork rivers to the confluence with the Flathead River, northeastern WA, northern ID, and northwestern MT
    - Lower Kalispel, on the Pend Oreille River to Lake Pend Oreille, northeastern WA and northern ID
    - Upper Kalispel, on the Clark Fork River to the confluence with the Flathead River, northern ID and northwestern MT,
  - Pend d'Oreille (sčɬq̓etkʷmcin), also known as the Upper Pend d'Oreille or Upper Kalispel, around Flathead Lake, the Flathead and Clark Fork rivers above the confluence, and the Bitterroot Valley, (Note: Pre 19th-century (Malouf 1998, pp. 297-298)) western MT
- Bitterroot Salish (séliš), also called the Flathead or the Salish, Bitterroot Valley (Note: Post-19th century (Malouf 1998, pp. 297-298)) and across the Continental Divide along the Missouri and Yellowstone rivers to Billings, southern MT

Just one people speaks the Cour d'Alene language:

- Coeur d'Alene people (schi̱tsu'umsh), also known as the Schitsu'umsh or Skitswish, eastern WA and northern ID
  - Spokane River-Coeur d'Alene Lake division
  - Coeur d'Alene River division
  - Saint Joe River division
