= Columbia-Moses language =

Indigenous language of the United States

Columbia-Moses
- Columbia-Wenatchi
- Nxaʔamxcín
- Pronunciation: [n̩xaʔamxət͡ʃín]
- Native to: United States
- Region: northern Idaho, eastern Washington
- Ethnicity: 230 Wenatchi, Chelan, Sinkiuse-Columbia, Entiat (2000 census)
- Extinct: May 2, 2023, with the death of Pauline Stensgar (Qʷiy̓mátkʷ)
- Language family: Salishan: Interior Salish; Southern; Columbia-Moses
- Dialects: Columbian; Wenatchi

Language codes
- ISO 639-3: col
- Glottolog: colu1241
- ELP: Columbian
- Columbian is classified as Extinct by the UNESCO Atlas of the World's Languages in Danger.

Columbia-Moses, also called Moses-Columbia or Columbia-Wenatchi (in Moses-Columbia: Nxaʔamxcín), is an extinct Southern Interior Salish language. Speakers traditionally lived in the Colville Indian Reservation.

== Classification ==
Nxaʔamxcín is classified as a member of the Salishan languages, a family of languages spoken throughout the Pacific Northwest. Specifically, Nxaʔamxcín is part of the Southern subgroup of Interior Salish, along with the Okanagan, Salish–Spokane–Kalispel, and Coeur d'Alene languages.

== Dialects ==
There were four dialects, Moses-Columbia (Sinkiuse, Columbian), Chelan, Entiat, and Wenatchi (Wenatchee). Wenatchi was the heritage language of the Wenatchi, Chelan, and Entiat tribes, Columbian of the Sinkiuse-Columbia.

== Revitalization ==
The language was extensively documented beginning in the 1960s, when there were about 22 speakers left. A language revitalization program began in the 1990s. Pauline Stensgar, who died on May 2, 2023, at age 96, is reported to have been the last known fully fluent speaker. She helped develop dictionaries and textbooks in the language.

Wenatchee Valley College offers classes in Nxaʔamxcín. They have 4 levels of classes, from beginner to advanced levels. Beginning in fall 2026, Paschal Sherman Indian School in Omak, Washington teaches Nxaʔamxcín along with Okanogan and Nez Perce to its primary school students.

A physical dictionary of the language is available, compiled by linguist M. Dale Kinkade, with help from language consultants in the Nxaʔamxcín community.

== Phonology ==
The phonological inventory of the Columbia-Wenatchi dialect is similar to other Interior Salish languages, with a large consonant inventory and a limited set of vowels.

=== Consonants ===
Nxaʔamxcín has 41 consonants, as shown below.

Consonants
		Bilabial	Alveolar			Palatal	Velar		Uvular		Pharyngeal		Glottal
		Bilabial	plain	lat.	sib.	Palatal	plain	lab.	plain	lab.	plain	lab.	Glottal
Plosive/ Affricate	tenuis	p	t		ts ~ tʃ		k	kʷ	q	qʷ			ʔ
Plosive/ Affricate	ejective	pʼ	tʼ	tɬʼ	tsʼ		kʼ	kʷ’	qʼ	qʷ’			
Fricative				ɬ	s ~ ʃ		x	xʷ	χ	χʷ	ħ	ħʷ	h
Sonorant	plain	m	n	l		j		w			ʕ	ʕʷ	
Sonorant	glottalic	mˀ	nˀ	lˀ		jˀ		wˀ			ʕˀ	ʕʷˀ	
Trill	plain		r										
Trill	glottalic		rˀ										

The consonants /s/ and /ts/ are "pronounced with tongue blade articluation and resemble [ʃ] and [tʃ], respectively", although this does not apply for the glottalized affricate /tsʼ/.

=== Vowels ===
The three vowels in Moses-Columbia are /a i u/. They are sometimes transcribed as [e] for /i/, [o] for /u/, and [æ] for /a/. Additionally, /a/ could also be transcribed as [ə]. The schwa vowel [ə] is typically epenthetic, surfacing in roots that do not attract stress.

=== Stress ===
Stress is indicated in the orthography by a rising accent mark. Words have one primary stress to the right-most edge, except for particles, which typically remain unstressed. For instance, the word hananík 'jackrabbit' has primary stress on the final syllable. Due to a process of vowel deletion (see the next section) following a primary stressed syllable, there may be secondary stress preceding the main stress, but not following it.

n-naqs-qín
LOC-one-top
'one tipi'

naqs-qn-wíl
one-top-container
'load'

Nxaʔamxcín has a complex cyclical stress assignment system. Suffixes in Nxaʔamxcín belong to one of two classes: those that trigger cyclic stress assignment and those that are assigned stress by a non-cyclic stress rule. The morphological category nor position of the suffix indicate which stress-assignment class a suffix belongs to.

=== Phonological processes ===
Nxaʔamxcín has active phonological rules. Some of which that have been discussed include epenthesis, deletion, and vocalization.

==== Vowel deletion ====
To the right of the stressed syllable, all vowels in a word are deleted. To the left of stress, however, only some of the vowels may be deleted. An example is kasħúycnmncn 'I'm going to bother you' from the combination of morphemes kas-ħúy-cin-min-tsin. To the right of the stress in the second syllable, no vowels are found in the word.

== Syntax ==
=== Imperatives ===
The Nxaʔamxcín positive imperative morpheme is taʔ. It is an enclitic which attaches to the verb stem after any person suffixes. The morpheme can never bear stress and does not affect the stress pattern in the stem. In contrast, negative imperatives do not have a particular morpheme associated with them. They are identical to negative clauses, using the word lut before the verb.

Positive vs. negative imperatives
Positive imperative	Translation	Negative imperative	Translation
núx̌t(t)aʔ	go!	lut kis-núxʷt	don't go/walk!
hycənmínct(t)aʔ	blabber!	lut kis-hycənmínct	don't blabber!
x̌áct(t)aʔ	dig!	lut kis-x̌áct	don't dig!

== Vocabulary ==
Here is a Nxaʔamxcín sample word:

- snkɬxwpáw’stn ‘clothesline’

=== Numbers ===
Nxaʔamxcín uses a base-10 counting system.

Numbers 1-10
Number	Nxaʔamxcín
1	naqš
2	tq̓aw̓š
3	kaʔłáš
4	múšəš
5	čilkšt
6	x̌ʷəčmákšt
7	šišp̓l̓k̓
8	twin
9	x̌n̓ut
10	xə́ƛ̓xəƛ̓t
