= Colville Indian Reservation =

Indian reservation in Washington, United States

Coordinates: 48°13′47″N 118°52′22″W

- Indian reservation
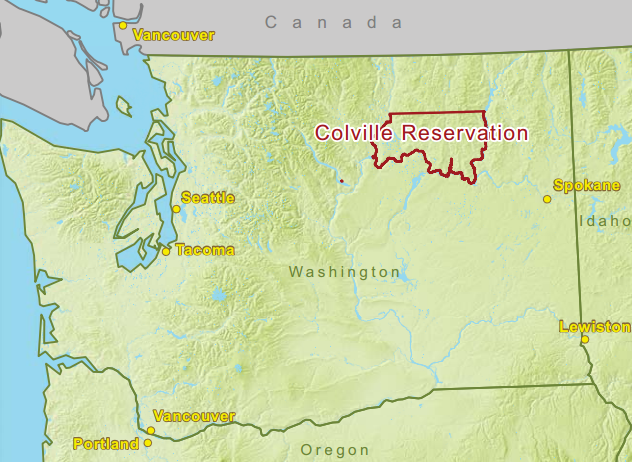
- Outline of the Colville Reservation
- Tribe: Confederated Tribes of the Colville Reservation
- Country: United States
- State: Washington
- County: Okanogan County, Washington and Ferry County, Washington
- Headquarters: Nespelem

Area
  - Total: 11,430 km^{2} (4,410 sq mi)
- Website: Colville Tribes

The Colville Indian Reservation is an Indian reservation located in Washington state, U.S. It is inhabited and managed by the Confederated Tribes of the Colville Reservation, who are a federally recognized tribe of Interior Salish peoples.

Established in 1872, the reservation currently consists of 2,825,000 acres (4,410 mi^{2}; 11,430 km^{2}). It includes the southeastern part of Okanogan County and the southern half of Ferry County. The reservation's name is taken from that of Fort Colville, which was named by British colonists for Andrew Colvile, a London governor of the Hudson's Bay Company.

The Confederated Tribes have 8,700 descendants from twelve bands of Indigenous peoples of the Northwestern Plateau. The tribes are known in English as: the Colville, Nespelem, Sanpoil, Lakes (after the Arrow Lakes of British Columbia, or Sinixt), Palus, Wenatchi, Chelan, Entiat, Methow, southern Okanagan, Sinkiuse-Columbia, and Nez Perce of Chief Joseph's Band. Some members of the Spokane tribe also settled the Colville reservation after it was established.

The most common of the indigenous languages spoken on the reservation is Colville-Okanagan, a Salishan language. Other tribes speak other Salishan languages, with the exception of the Nez Perce and Palus, who speak Sahaptian languages.

== History ==
=== Pre-colonial ===
Before the influx of British and Americans in the mid-1850s, the ancestors of the 12 aboriginal tribes followed seasonal cycles to gather their food sources. They moved to the rivers for salmon and other fish runs, mountain meadows for berries and deer, or the plateau for roots. Their traditional territories were grouped primarily around waterways, such as the Columbia, San Poil, Nespelem, Okanogan, Snake, and Wallowa rivers.

Many tribal ancestors ranged throughout their aboriginal territories and other areas in the Northwest (including British Columbia), gathering with other native peoples for traditional activities such as food harvesting, feasting, trading, and celebrations that included sports and gambling. Their lives were tied to the cycles of nature, both spiritually and traditionally.

=== 19th century and establishment ===
In the mid-19th century, when European-American settlers began competing for trade with the indigenous native peoples, many tribes began to migrate westward. Trading and its goods became a bigger part of their lives.

For a while, Great Britain and the United States disputed the territory of what the latter called the Oregon Country and the former the Columbia District. Both claimed the territory until they agreed on the Oregon Treaty of 1846, which established United States title south of the 49th Parallel. They did not consider any of the indigenous peoples living in those territories to be citizens or entitled to the lands by their own national claims. However, according to the religions and traditions of the indigenous peoples, this territory had been their home land since the time of creation. A succession of indigenous cultures had occupied this region for more than 10,000 years.

President Fillmore signed a bill creating the Washington Territory, and he appointed as Commissioner of Indian Affairs, Major Isaac Stevens of the United States Army Corps of Engineers, to meet with the Indians during his exploration for railroad routes. Stevens wrote a report recommending the creation of "reservations" for the people in the Washington Territory. The report said, "contrary to natural rights and usage," the United States should grant lands that would become reservations to the Indians without purchasing from them.

In 1854, negotiations were conducted "particularly in the vicinity of white settlements, toward extinguishment of the Indian claims to the lands and the concentration of the tribes and fragments of tribes on a few reservations naturally suited to the requirement of the Indians, and located, so far as practicable, so as not to interfere with the settlement of the country."

During this time, continued American settlement created conflicts and competition for resources with the native tribes. It resulted in the Yakima War, which was fought from 1856 to 1859. Negotiations were unsuccessful until 1865. Superintendent McKenny then commented:

From this report, the necessity of trading with these Indians can scarcely fail to be obvious. They now occupy the best agricultural lands in the whole country and they claim an undisputed right to these lands. White squatters are constantly making claims in their territory and not infrequently invading the actual improvements of the Indians. The state of things cannot but prove disastrous to the peace of the country unless forestalled by a treaty fixing the rights of the Indians and limiting the aggressions of the white man. The fact that a portion of the Indians refused all gratuitous presents shows a determination to hold possession of the country here until the government makes satisfactory overtures to open the way of actual purchase.[7]

Seeking to improve relations with the Native Americans, President Grant issued an Executive Order on April 9, 1872, to create an "Indian Reservation" consisting of several million acres of land, containing rivers, streams, timbered forests, grass lands, minerals, plants and animals. People from 11 tribes (the Colville, the Nespelem, the San Poil, Lakes (Sinixt), Palus, Wenatchi, Chelan, Entiat, Methow, southern Okanogan, and the Moses Columbia) were designated to live on a new Colville Indian Reservation. That original reservation was west of the Columbia River. Less than three months later, the President issued another executive order on July 2, moving the reservation further west, to reach from the Columbia River on the east and south, to the Okanogan River on the west, and the Canada–U.S. border to the north. The new reservation was smaller, at 2,852,000 acres (4,456 mi^{2}; 11,540 km^{2}). The Tribes' historic native lands of the Okanogan River, Methow Valley, and other large areas along the Columbia and Pend d'Oreille rivers, along with the Colville Valley, were excluded. The areas removed from the reservation were some of the richest in terms of fertility of land and available natural resources.

Twenty years later, the United States changed government policy, intending to dissolve Indian reservations throughout the United States and make allotments of land to individual households in order to encourage subsistence farming. (This would also "free" land declared excess to tribal needs to be sold to non-Native Americans.) Under the General Allotment Act (Dawes Act) of 1887, the members of the tribes at the Colville reservation were registered and land allotted. An 1892 act of Congress removed the north half of the reservation, north of Township 34 (now known as the Old North Half), from tribal control, with allotments made to Indians then living on it, and the rest opened up for settlement by others. In 1891, the tribes had entered into an agreement with the federal government to vacate the Old North Half, in exchange for $1.5 million ($1 per acre) and continued hunting and fishing rights, but the 1892 act was based only loosely on that agreement. The government did not complete payments for the land for 14 years. But the tribes retained their hunting and fishing rights to their former reservation land (superior to those of non-members). As was customary then in reservation allotments, individual Indians living on the Old North Half who refused to move to the remaining south half were allotted only 80 acres (32 ha) of land, rather than the 160 acres they would have received within the southern reservation boundaries.

=== 20th century ===
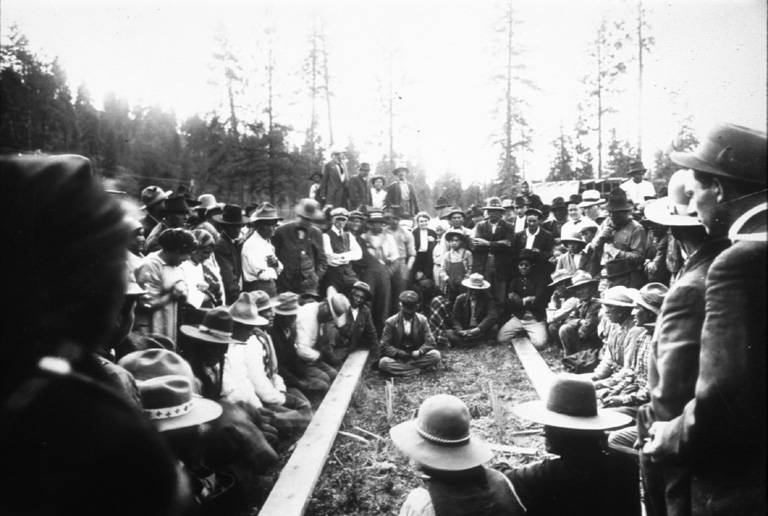
Men, women and children watch a stick game, where group of men sit in two lines, separated by 2x4s, some have sticks in hand. One man sits between the posts. Photo circa 1908.

The remainder of the communal reservation land was allotted to households, in the same 80-acre amounts, and tribal authority ended, by act of Congress in 1906. The government declared the land not allotted to be excess to tribal needs and opened it for settlement in 1916 by Presidential proclamation. The allotment act was based on an agreement negotiated between the tribes and Indian agent James McLaughlin, signed by two-thirds of the adult male Indians then living on the reservation (of whom there were approximately 600). The Dawes Act enacted a US policy of terminating reservations and tribal government, and did not require any consent by or compensation to Indians. Agreements that Indians did sign were not entirely mutual. They were concerned more with the details of the allotment than the fact of it.

In the face of loss of lands and considerable social distress, President Franklin D. Roosevelt changed federal policy toward the tribes. The Indian Reorganization Act of 1934 reversed the policy of dissolution of reservations and immediately halted the transfer of reservation land to private ownership. Tribes were encouraged to re-establish their tribal governments and establish constitutions based on democratic electoral models.

In 1956, Congress restored tribal control to the Colville Tribes over all land in the north half that was not yet privately owned. In the time since then, the tribe has gradually purchased private land on the reservation and had it placed back into trust status as tribal land. Since the late 20th century, they have received some of the funds for this from the federal government, pursuant to lawsuits, as compensation for the government's mismanagement of the trust lands and insufficient compensation to Indians for former reservation land. In addition, President Barack Obama established a Buy-Back Program.

=== 21st century ===
The lands of the Colville Indian Reservation along the Columbia River, are downstream from the Teck Cominco smelter in Trail, British Columbia, Canada. For decades the historic smelter deposited slag from its plant into the river which flows into Roosevelt Lake. In 2004, when it was revealed that the contamination included mercury, lead, and zinc, two members of the Colville Confederated Tribes filed a citizen lawsuit against Teck Cominco in Pakootas v. Teck Cominco Metals. Fish from the Columbia River is the traditional food of the Colville people who value the fish "for subsistence, cultural and spiritual reasons".

== Description ==
The reservation encompasses 1,400,000 acres (2,188 mi^{2}; 5,666 km^{2}) of land, consisting of tribally owned lands held in federal trust status for the Colville Confederated Tribes, land owned by individual Colville tribal members (most of which is also held in federal trust status), and land owned by other tribal or non-tribal entities.

7,587 people live on the reservation (2000 census), including both Colville tribe members and non-tribe members. Most live either in small communities or in rural settings. Approximately half of the Confederated Tribes' enrolled members live on or near the reservation. According to the Tribes records in 2015, they have 9,500 enrolled members.

Major towns and cities within the reservation include Omak (part), Nespelem, Inchelium, Keller, and Coulee Dam (part).

In 1997 and 1998, the Colville Confederated Tribes commemorated the 125th anniversary of the signing of the Executive Order that created the reservation.

== Communities ==
- Coulee Dam (part, population 915)
- Disautel
- Elmer City
- Inchelium
- Keller
- Nespelem
- Nespelem Community (Agency area)
- North Omak
- Okanogan (a small part, population 2)
- Omak (part, population 742)
- Twin Lakes

== Government ==
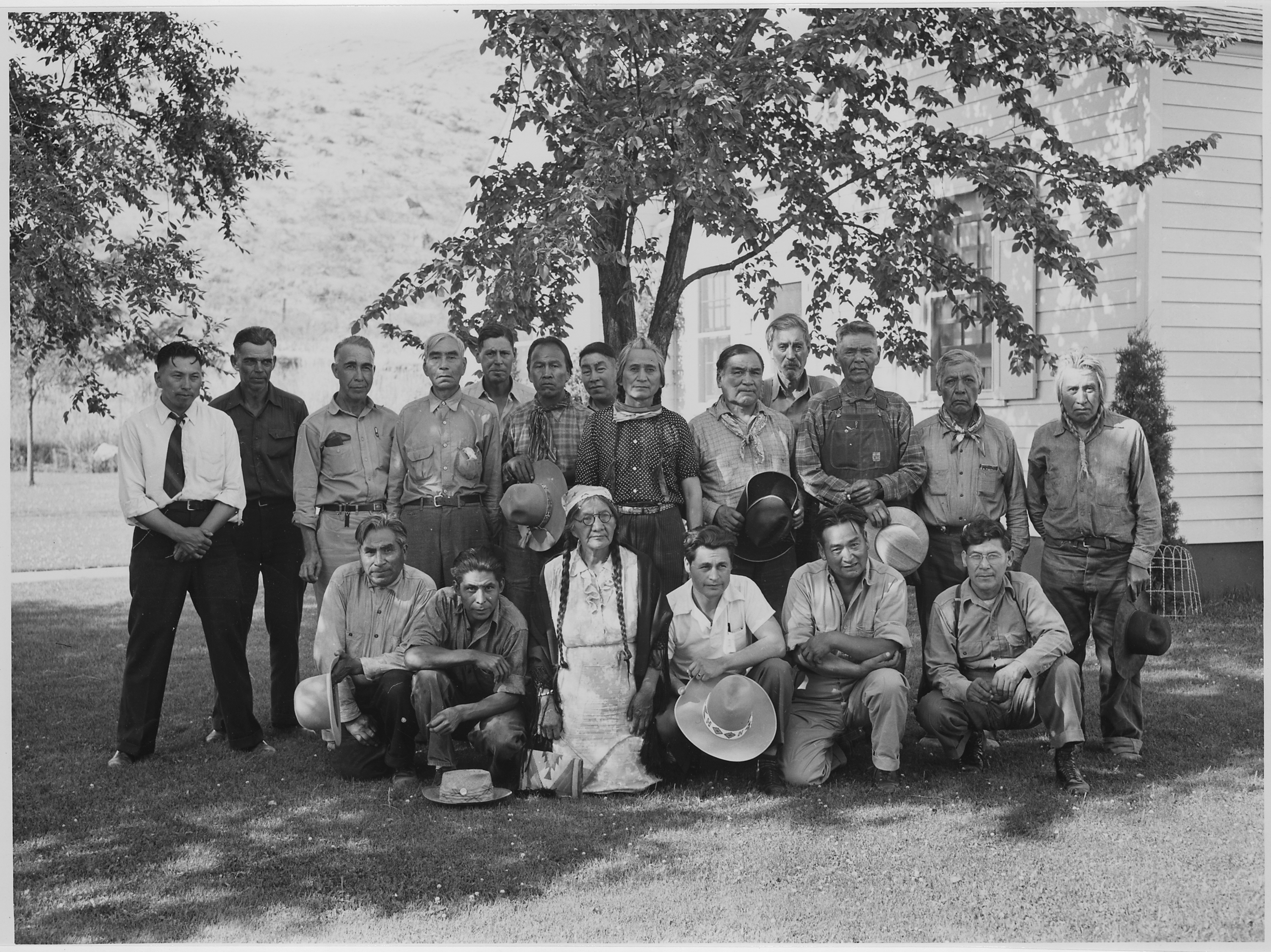
Colville Business Council and some hereditary chiefs and elders in 1941

The Confederated Tribes and the Colville Indian Reservation are governed by the Colville Business Council. From its administrative headquarters located at the Bureau of Indian Affairs (BIA) Agency at Nespelem, the Colville Business Council oversees a diverse, multi-million-dollar administration that employs from 800 to 1,200 individuals in permanent, part-time, and seasonal positions.

Members of the Colville Business Council are elected to a renewable two-year term of office. Four council members are elected from each legislative district noted above, except for the lesser-populated Keller District, which elects two. Each year, half of the Business Council seats in each district are up for election. Elections are held mid-June, with votes cast in person at polling sites at a predesignated location (usually the local community center) or by absentee ballot.

=== Legislative districts ===
The tribe is governed by a Chairman and the Colville Business Council, the latter consisting of members elected from tribal legislative districts. These are as follows.

- Omak District: The largest district by population, this consists of the northwestern portion of the reservation: the Okanogan Valley and the eastern portion of the city of Omak. The Okanogan River is the western border of the reservation and delimits the reservation portion of Omak.
- Nespelem District: The west-central portion of the reservation, including the Nespelem Valley and part of the city of Coulee Dam. The Reservation Headquarters is located in the district on the Bureau of Indian Affairs Agency campus near the town of Nespelem. In Coulee Dam, the Columbia River also serves as a reservation border within the town limits.
- Keller District: This is the east-central region of the reservation, namely the San Poil Valley to the mouth of the Columbia River, along a tributary, the San Poil River, and the edge of the man-made Lake Roosevelt.
- Inchelium District: The north-east part of the reservation.

=== Judicial Branch ===
The Colville Tribal Court is a separate branch of government consisting of the Colville Tribal Court of Appeals and the Colville Trial Court. It is the duty of the Courts to interpret and enforce the laws of the Confederated Tribes of the Colville Reservation. The Chief Judge of the Colville Trial Court is appointed to a six year term by the business counsel and is subject to a vote of confidence by the general membership three years after appointment.

== Economy ==
Colville Tribal Federal Corporation (CTFC) has responsibility for managing economic development. It manages 13 enterprises that "include gaming, recreation and tourism, retail, construction and wood products." CTFC is an economic leader in northeastern Washington. "The corporation employs over 800 people" and generates more than $120 million annually in revenues.

After three years in development, in 2013 the tribes opened the Chief Joseph Hatchery for salmon fishery enhancement below the Chief Joseph Dam, in an effort to aid restoration of the salmon run on the Columbia River. In the first year, they released 1.9 million smolts. In 2017, at full production, they expect to release 2.9 million. Typically, only one percent return as adults.

At the First Salmon Ceremony in May 2016, there was a special celebration as these tribes and members of others from both sides of the 49th parallel commemorated the return of salmon to the river, and the first jacks to return to the hatchery. When adult salmon return in 2017, they will be ready for harvest. Members of the United Columbia Upriver Tribes Committee are collaborating on ways to restore runs above the Chief Joseph and Grand Coulee dams, using new technology that eases the passage of fish.

== Education ==
The Colville Indian Reservation spans several school districts that overlap with the reservation's boundaries. These include the Inchelium School District, Keller School District, Nespelem School District, Okanogan School District, and Omak School District. Students from the Colville Tribes are able to choose between Wilbur High School, Lake Roosevelt High School in Coulee Dam, or Republic High School. Post-secondary education is provided by a joint venture between Spokane Tribal College and Salish Kootenai College on Nespelem's Agency Campus. The public Community Colleges of Spokane have an outreach campus in Inchelium, while the Wenatchee Valley College North Campus is located in Omak.

Pascal Sherman Indian School, located outside Omak at St. Mary's Mission, is the only Native American residential school on the reservation currently serving grades pre-K-to-9.

== Transportation ==
Buses operated by the Colville Confederated Tribes Department of Transportation

Several highways bisect the reservation, including State Route 155 from Omak to Coulee Dam; and State Route 21 from Keller to Republic. The Colville Indian Reservation has 1,665 miles (2,680 km) of roads, of which 965 miles (1,553 km) are maintained by the Bureau of Indian Affairs. These roads include 120 miles (190 km) that are paved, 100 miles (160 km) of gravel roads, and 745 miles (1,199 km) of unpaved roads. Other roads are maintained by county governments and the state government.

The Colville Confederated Tribes Department of Transportation operates local bus and paratransit service that carried 1,958 total passenger trips in 2024. The agency also operates the Gifford–Inchelium ferry on the Columbia River, which carried 137,731 passengers in 2024. The ferry is a free service that is funded by the Bureau of Indian Affairs and has been under tribal control since 1994.

== Legends ==
- Coyote and the Buffalo (why buffalo do not live near Kettle Falls)
- Coyote quarrels with mole (coyote fighting with his wife)
- Spirit chief names the animal people (about the naming of the "Chip-chap-tiqulk")
- Turtle and the eagle (about turtle beating eagle in a race)
