= Palouse (disambiguation) =

The Palouse is a geographic region in Idaho, Oregon, and Washington, in the United States.

Palouse may also refer to:

- Palus people, a Native American people in the United States
- Palouse, Washington, a city in the United States
- the Palouse River, in Idaho and Washington, in the United States
