= Entiat people =

Native American people from Washington State, U.S.

Entiat
šntiyátkʷəxʷ

Total population
- 113 (1954)

Regions with significant populations
- Eastern Washington, U.S.

Languages
- English, Entiat language

Religion
- Indigenous religion, Christianity

Related ethnic groups
- other Confederated Tribes of the Colville Reservation and other Interior Salish peoples

The Entiat (Columbia-Moses: šntiyátkʷəxʷ) are a Native American band of Interior Salish peoples in eastern Washington State. Historically, they lived around the Columbia River to the Cascade Mountains along the drainage system of the Entiat River. Today, they are part of the Confederated Tribes of the Colville Reservation.

The Sintiatqkumuhs band lived on the Columbia between the Entiat River and the Wenatchee River.

== Name ==
The Entiat are also called Sintia'tkumuk, Sintiatqkumuhs, Inti-etook, and Intietooks.

"Entiat" is the transliteration of the Salishan word /nt'yátkʷ/, [nt'iátkʷ], "place of grassy water", from /na-/, "place", /st'íyaʔ/, "tall grass, hay", and /-atkʷ/, "water".

== Colville Reservation ==
The Entiat are citizens of the Confederated Tribes of the Colville Reservation, a federally recognized tribe. It is located on the Colville Indian Reservation in eastern Washington state. The Confederated Tribes have more than 9,000 citizens from 12 historical bands. In addition to the Entiat, the tribes are known in English as the Colville, the Nespelem, the Sanpoil, the Lake (Sinixt), the Palus, the Wenatchi, the Chelan, the Methow, the southern Okanagan, the Sinkiuse-Columbia, and the Nez Perce of Chief Joseph's Band.

Chief La-Hoom (also spelled La Hoompt) signed the Yakima Treaty of 1855, resulting in most of the tribe moving to the Colville Indian Reservation.

== Language ==
The tribe's Entiat language was an Interior Salish language. According to one linguist, it was a dialect of the Nxa?amxcin language. Today, the Entiat speak English.

== Population ==
The Entiat enrollment of September 24, 1954, listed 113 Entiat.

== Religion ==
Many of the tribe converted to Catholicism after Urban Grassi, a Jesuit priest, built a mission in the area c. 1870.
