= Stick gambling =

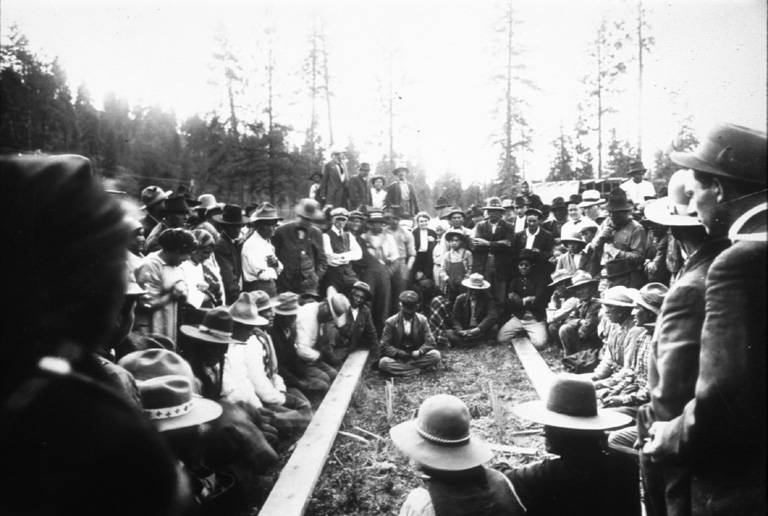
A stick game being played at Colville Indian Reservation in Washington, circa 1908

Stick gambling is a traditional hand game played by many indigenous people in the Northern Regions of Canada and Alaska, with the rules varying among each group. It would typically be played when diverse groups met on the trail. Games could last for several days during which prized matches, shot, gunpowder, or tobacco would be staked. Traditionally, only men would take part. However in modern games, both genders are able to play. The Yukon Territory First Nations in Canada holds many annual hand games, or stick gambling tournaments, in which both genders play.

== Game Rules ==
Two equally sized teams kneel on the ground facing one another. On one side, the players hide a token (idzi) in their fist. The token is passed back and forth between fists. Drummers behind provide music and sing gambling songs. When the captain on the opposing team claps their hands, the drumming ceases and the players show their fists.

The captain then uses a hand signal to guess which hand the token is in, against all opposing players at once. A correct guess eliminates that player, and each player who has not been eliminated receives a counting stick. When all opposing players have been eliminated the right to hide the idzi passes to the other team. The game ends when one of the teams have two of the three 'judge sticks'.

=== Yukon style ===
To play this game requires an even number of teams, 2 more sticks than players (i.e. 12 people need 14 sticks), three game sticks (once a team has two they have won the game), two blankets or more to assist with hiding the bead, as many beads (tokens) as people and two judges (one for each side).

The game must start with a battle between the captains. Both hide their bead and when both are ready they "shoot" (point) which hand to open. While playing the game, there are different calls a team captain must make. Whichever captain wins, their team goes down first to hide the token. A player has two options when they are ready to bring their hands up with clenched fists after hiding the bead, they may either cross hands and say "Dia" or leave their hands not crossed. Most players are very creative with how they hold their stances after coming up from hiding. Once the full team is up from hiding or whatever members remain, the opposing captain points. The options for pointing are Left, Right, Inside Split, Outside Split (there are many hand signals for these as well as double hand signals). Thumb placement when pointing is very important. If players point left or right and have their thumb up that is technically an outside split and requires specific placement between two people. Similarly, if players have their thumb up for an inside split, they are saying the person their thumb points to is opening the outside hand.

If the captain points left, the opposing team will open their right hands (whichever hand is pointed to). If the captain points right, the opposing team will open their left hands. An inside split will most likely be an open hand (like going in for a hand shake) set between two people, and wherever the split is placed it will be the inside hand for each person. An outside split usually looks like a finger gun and wherever is placed it will be all the outside hands.
