= Interior Salish languages =

Branch of the Salishan languages of western North America

Interior Salish
- Geographic distribution: Canada (British Columbia) and United States (Washington, Idaho, Montana)
- Ethnicity: Interior Salish peoples
- Linguistic classification: Salishan: Interior Salish
- Subdivisions: Northern; Southern

Language codes
- Glottolog: inte1241
- Map of Salishan languages. Interior Salish territories are in olive green and yellow.

The Interior Salish languages are one of the two main branches of the Salishan language family, the other being Coast Salish. It can be further divided into Northern and Southern subbranches.

These languages are spoken by the Interior Salish peoples. The first Interior Salish people encountered by American explorers were the Bitterroot Salish (seliš).

== Languages ==
Languages with no living native speakers are marked with an obelisk, †.

- Interior Salish
  - Northern
    - Shuswap, also known as Secwepemctsín and səxwəpməxcín.
    - Lillooet, also known as St'át'imcets.
    - Thompson River Salish, (nłeʔképmxcín; also known as Nlakaʼpamux, Ntlakapmuk, Thompson Salish, and Thompson.)
      - Spuzzum dialect, also called Lower Thompson (spəzm̓mxcín)
      - sƛ̓eyéxʷcín
      - nk̓əmcínxcín
      - Nicola dialect (scw̓exmcín)
  - Southern
    - Coeur d’Alene, also known as Snchitsuʼumshtsn and snčícuʔumšcn.
    - Columbia-Moses †, (Note: Currently undergoing revival.) also known as Columbia and Nxaʔamxcín.
    - Colville-Okanagan, also known as Okanagan, Nxsəlxcin, Nsilxcín, Nsíylxcən, and ta nukunaqínxcən.
    - Montana Salish, also known as Spokane-Kalispel-Flathead, Kalispel–Pend d'Oreille language, and Spokane–Kalispel–Bitterroot Salish–Upper Pend d'Oreille.

The Southern Interior Salish languages share many common phonemic values but are separated by both vowel and consonant shifts (for example k k̓ x > č č' š).

== Interior Salish–speaking peoples ==
=== Northern ===
- Secwepemc, also known as Shuswap, Secwepemctsín, səxwəpməxcín (ʃəxwəpməxtʃín).
- St̓át̓imc, also known as Stlʼatlʼimx, Stlʼatlʼimc, Sƛ’aƛ’imxǝc (St̓át̓imcets, also known as Úcwalmicwts).
- Nlaka'pamux, also known as Thompson River Salish, Ntlakapmuk, Ntleʼkepmxcín, Thompson River, Thompson Salish, Thompson, known in frontier times as the Hakamaugh, Klackarpun, Couteau or Knife Indians.

=== Central ===
- Colville, Sinixt (Senjextee, Sin Aikst, or Lakes Band), Sanpoil, Okanagan, and Methow, all of whom speak Nxsəlxcin, nsyilxcən.

=== Eastern ===
- Spokane, Kalispel, and the Flathead, including the Bitterroot, all of whom speak Montana Salish.

=== Southern ===
- Sinkiuse-Columbia, Entiat, Wenatchi, and Chelan, all of whom traditionally speak or spoke Columbia-Moses, also known as Nxaảmxcín, Sinkiuse-Columbia, Sinkiuse, Columbia.
- Coeur d'Alene people, also known as Schitsu'umsh or Skitswish (Coeur d'Alene language).

Many speakers and students of these languages live near the city of Spokane and for the past three years have gathered at the Celebrating Salish Conference which is hosted by the Kalispel Tribe at the Northern Quest Resort & Casino.

== See also ==
- Coast Salish languages
