= Nespelem Community, Washington =

- CDP
- Location of Nespelem Community, Washington
- Coordinates: 48°12′15″N 118°59′47″W
- Country: United States
- State: Washington
- County: Okanogan

Area
  - Total: 23.1 sq mi (59.9 km^{2})
  - Land: 23.1 sq mi (59.8 km^{2})
  - Water: 0 sq mi (0.0 km^{2})
- Elevation: 2,261 ft (689 m)

Population (2020)
  - Total: 283
  - Density: 12.3/sq mi (4.73/km^{2})
- Time zone: UTC-8 (Pacific (PST))
  - Summer (DST): UTC-7 (PDT)
- ZIP code: 99155
- Area code: 509
- FIPS code: 53-48550
- GNIS feature ID: 2408915

Nespelem Community is a census-designated place (CDP) in on the Colville Indian Reservation in Okanogan County, Washington, United States. The population was 283 at the 2020 census.

== Geography ==
According to the United States Census Bureau, the CDP has a total area of 23.1 square miles (59.9 km^{2}), of which, 23.1 square miles (59.8 km^{2}) of it is land and 0.04 square miles (0.1 km^{2}) of it (0.09%) is water.

== Demographics ==
Historical population
| Census | Pop. | Note | %± |
|---|---|---|---|
| 1990 | 291 | | — |
| 2000 | 290 | | −0.3% |
| 2010 | 253 | | −12.8% |
| 2020 | 283 | | 11.9% |
US Decennial Census; 2020 Census

As of the census of 2000, there were 290 people, 84 households, and 58 families residing in the CDP. The population density was 12.6 people per square mile (4.8/km^{2}). There were 102 housing units at an average density of 4.4/sq mi (1.7/km^{2}). The racial makeup of the CDP was 6.55% White, 92.07% Native American, 0.69% from other races, and 0.69% from two or more races. Hispanic or Latino of any race were 2.76% of the population.

There were 84 households, out of which 33.3% had children under the age of 18 living with them, 36.9% were married couples living together, 25.0% had a female householder with no husband present, and 29.8% were non-families. 27.4% of all households were made up of individuals, and 6.0% had someone living alone who was 65 years of age or older. The average household size was 3.45 and the average family size was 4.22.

In the CDP, the population was spread out, with 37.2% under the age of 18, 6.6% from 18 to 24, 29.3% from 25 to 44, 17.9% from 45 to 64, and 9.0% who were 65 years of age or older. The median age was 30 years. For every 100 females, there were 116.4 males. For every 100 females age 18 and over, there were 119.3 males.

The median income for a household in the CDP was $39,688, and the median income for a family was $48,438. Males had a median income of $23,750 versus $21,667 for females. The per capita income for the CDP was $12,507. About 9.8% of families and 11.9% of the population were below the poverty line, including 4.5% of those under the age of eighteen and 9.5% of those 65 or over.

== Education ==
The area is served by the Nespelem School District.
