= Sinkiuse-Columbia =

Indigenous people of the Northwest Plateau in the United States

.tskowa'xtsEnux

Regions with significant populations
- United States (Washington)

Languages
- English, Columbia

Related ethnic groups
- Colville, Sanpoil, Nespelem, Sinixt, Wenatchi, Entiat, Methow, Southern Okanagan, Palus, Nez Perce of Chief Joseph's band, and Pisquow

The Sinkiuse-Columbia are a Native American tribe so-called because of their former prominent association with the Columbia River. They speak the Columbia-Moses language and are an Interior Salish people whose nearest relatives are the Wenatchis and Methows.

== Name ==
The Sinkiuses call themselves .tskowa'xtsEnux, or .skowa'xtsEnEx (meaning has something to do with "main valley"), or Sinkiuse. They apply the name to other neighboring Interior Salish peoples, potentially originating from a band that once inhabited the Umatilla Valley.

Other names the Sinkiuse-Columbia people were known by include:

- Bo'tcaced, by the Nez Percé, probably, meaning "arrows" or "arrow people."
- Papspê'lu, another Nez Perce name, meaning "firs," or "fir-tree people."
- Isle-de-Pierre, name conferred by the French Canadian employees of the fur companies, meaning "rock island", perhaps for a band of the tribe.
- Middle Columbia Salish, so called by Teit (1928) and Spier (1930 b).
- Sa'ladebc, probably the Snohomish name.
- Suwa'dabc, Snohomish name for all interior Indians, meaning "inland people," or "interior people."
- swa'dab.c, Twana name for all interior Indians, meaning "inland people."
- swa'namc, Nooksack name for all interior Indians, meaning "inland people."
- Ti'attluxa, Wasco Chinook name.

== Ethnography ==
The homeland of the Sinkiuse was based on the Columbia River from Crab Creek upstream to the Wenatchee River and centered on Moses Coulee. In 1870, Winans placed them "on the east and south sides of the Columbia River from the Grand Coulee down to Priest's Rapids."

Hale classified the Sinkiuse as a division of the Pisquows with population 355 in 1905, 299 in 1908, 540 (with others?) in 1990. Mooney (1928) estimates the Sinkiuse to have numbered 800 in 1780, but they may have been more numerous as Teit (1927) estimated that this tribe and the Pisquow together totaled approximately 10,000 before smallpox reached them.

Subdivisions or Bands (According to Teit, 1930)

- .nkee'us or .s.nkeie'usox (Umatilla Valley).
- Stata'ketux, around White Bluffs on the Columbia River.
- .tskowa'xtsEnux or .skowa'xtsFnEx, also called Moses-Columbia or Moses Band after Chief Moses.
- Curtis (1907–09) gives the following: "Near the mouth of the sink of Crab Creek were the Sinkumkunatkuh, and above them the SinkolkolumInuh. Then came in succession the Stapi'sknuh, the Skukulat'kuh, the Skoáhchnuh, the Skihlkintnuh, and, finally, the Skultagchi'mh, a little above the mouth of Wenatchee River."
- Spier (1927) adds that the Sinkowarsin met by Thompson in 1811 might have been a band of this tribe.

During the beginning of the reservation era, the Sinkiuses were located at the Columbia Reservation. After its closure, they were placed under the jurisdiction of Colville Agency and one band, the Moses-Columbia Band, is in the southern part of Colville Indian Reservation.

== Language ==
The Sinkiuse-Columbia historically spoke an Interior Salish Southern dialect, Columbia-Moses. Other Interior Salish Southern dialects, were spoken by Pisquow, Wenatchi, and Methow.
