= Sinixt =

Indigenous peoples of Canada and the United States

Total population
- 250 in the US

Regions with significant populations
- Canada (British Columbia); United States (Washington)

Languages
- English, Salishan, Interior Salish

Related ethnic groups
- Colville, Sanpoil, Nespelem, Palus, Wenatchi, Entiat, Methow, Southern Okanagan, Sinkiuse-Columbia, and the Nez Perce of Chief Joseph's band

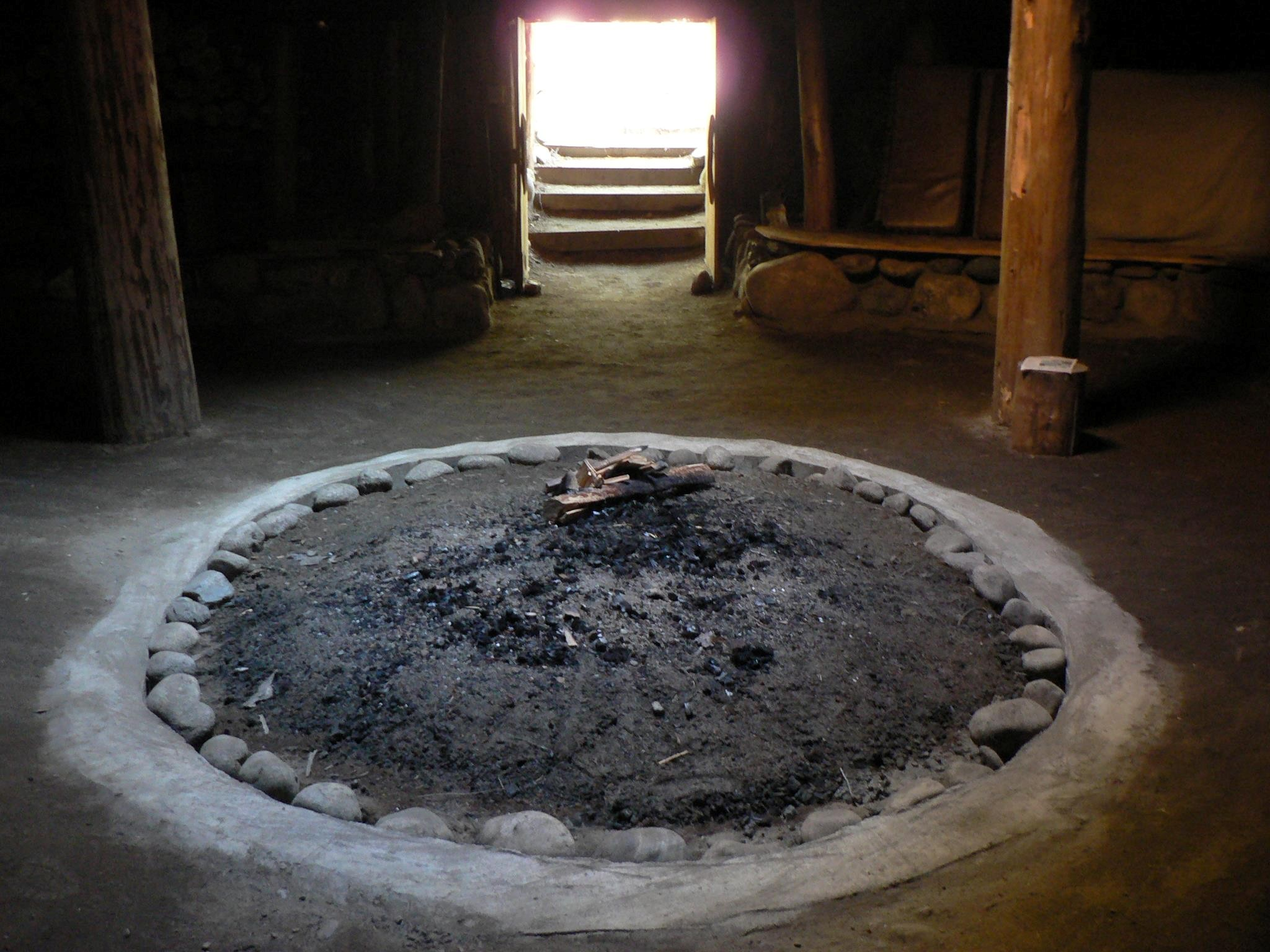
Interior of a Sinixt pithouse in the Slocan Valley

The Sinixt (sin-AYKST; also known as the Sin-Aikst or Sin Aikst, "Senijextee", "Arrow Lakes Band", or—less commonly in recent decades—simply as "The Lakes") are a First Nations People. The Sinixt are descended from Indigenous peoples who have lived primarily in what are today known as the West Kootenay region of British Columbia in Canada and the adjacent regions of Eastern Washington in the United States for at least 10,000 years. The Sinixt are of Salishan linguistic extraction, and speak their own dialect (snsəlxcín) of the Colville-Okanagan language.

Today they live primarily on the Colville Indian Reservation in Washington, where they form part of the Confederated Tribes of the Colville Reservation, which is recognized by the United States government as an American Indian Tribe. Many Sinixt continue to live in their traditional territory on the Northern Side of the 49th Parallel, particularly in the Slocan Valley and scattered amongst neighbouring tribes throughout BC, however the Canadian Government declared the Sinixt extinct in 1956.

== History ==
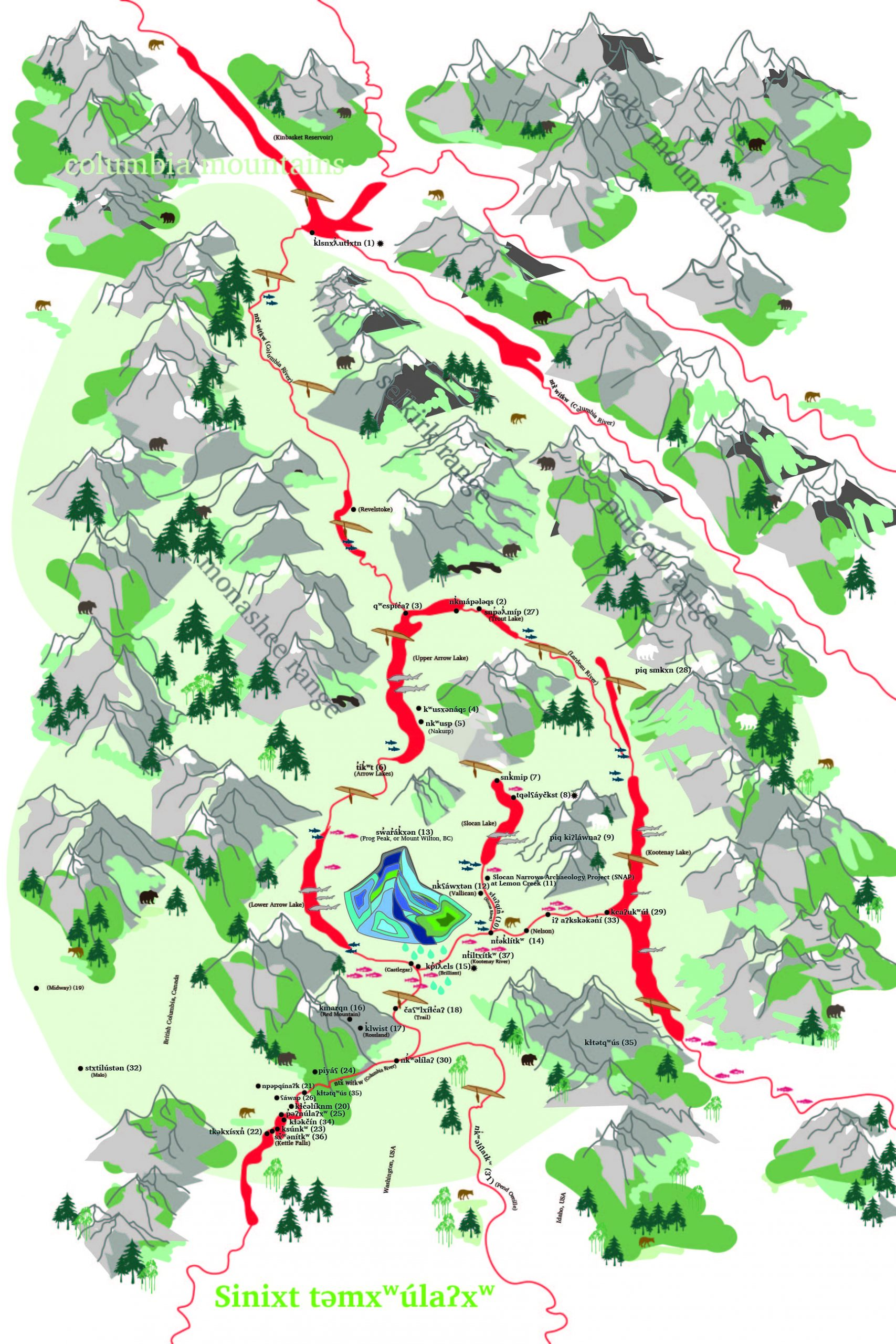
Sinixt təmxʷúlaʔxʷ map with place names labeled in the snsəlxcín dialect

=== Traditional territory ===
In her anthropological study of the Sinixt in Canada, Keeping the Lakes Way, Paula Pryce notes that "despite their obscurity in Canada and the scattered documentation of their presence in the area, both archival and published material show that the Sinixt Interior Salish resided along the Columbia River, Arrow Lakes, Slocan Valley, and parts of Kootenay Lake..." Other tribes used the Columbia as a trade route, passing through Sinixt territory to trade with the Sinixt and to trade further south. Parts of the traditional territory of the Sinixt are being claimed by the Westbank Band of the Okanagan people and as shared use and occupancy by the Ktunaxa. There is controversy over their historic claims to the area.

=== Traditional life ===
According to Lawney Reyes, the Sinixt numbered about 3,000 in the early 19th century, divided into several bands of sizes suited to hunting and fishing. He distinguishes the "Upper Sin-Aikst" around the Arrow Lakes, "above Revelstoke and around the Castlegar, Trail, and Slocan Valley area" from the "Lower Sin-Aikst in the Northport, Bossburg, Marcus, and Kettle Falls area in Washington State." The latter constituted "at least eight large bands". Once they obtained horses, they ranged farther east to hunt on the Great Plains.

In prehistoric times, the Sinixt were a semi-sedentary people, living in warm, semi-subterranean houses for the winter months. Summers were spent fishing, hunting, and gathering other food resources in their mountain and lake-dominated homeland. Reyes says that they wintered in the more wind-sheltered valleys, but summered by the Columbia. Scholars have classified the Sinixt as "complex collectors" (as opposed, for example, to "hunter-gatherers").

Sharon Montgomery of the Nakusp Museum, and tribal legend documented by Nancy Perkins Wynecoop and Nettie Wynecoop Clark describe the Sinixt as the "Mother Tribe" of the Pacific Northwest Salish. In an interview with the journalist Rex Weyler, Bob Campbell, "Headman" of the Sinixt in British Columbia, notes that, "As the mother nation, we often settled disputes among the (other) bands." Contributors to the article's forum refuted the claims as being without ethnographic or historical foundation. Sinixt mitochondrial DNA can be found at the base of Native American Haplogroup B2. (See GENBANK Accession EF648602.)

Early white explorers reported the Sinixt to be of average height and size, with hazel eyes. They were adept in making suspended bridges over the narrow, swift-flowing Columbia, and skillful at fishing.

Their staples included huckleberry, salmon, and roots (camas, bitterroot), but they also ate black moss, other berries (serviceberry, gooseberry, and foam berry), hazelnuts, wild carrots, peppermint, and various game meats (deer, elk, moose, caribou, rabbit, mountain sheep, mountain goat, and bear; after the coming of the horse, they also ventured east after bison). They chewed pine pitch like gum, and had a range of herbal medicines. Starting in June, mature salmon arrived at Kettle Falls, the farthest downriver that the Sinixt territory extended. The Sinixt caught only the salmon that were not strong enough to clear the falls, ensuring that the strongest went on to spawn. Both bands traveled to Red Mountain near Rossland, B.C. to harvest huckleberries in August. These seasonal events figured prominently in their culture. They hunted in late autumn, but still often were short of food by late winter.

The Upper Sin Aikst trained dogs to drive deer toward the Columbia River, where hunters in canoes shot them with bow and arrow. The Sin Aikst used the distinctive Sturgeon-nosed canoe; about 15–17 feet (4.5–5 meters) long with a cedar frame covered by large slabs of pine bark, riding low in the water with downward-sloping tips to reduce wind resistance.

Reyes says that they often intermarried with the Swhy-ayl-puh (Colville), who had a very similar language. The territory of the latter was largely in the Colville Valley and intersected Sinixt territory at Kettle Falls.

Reyes gives an account of various Sinixt customs, especially related to pregnancy, birth, and education, as well as some descriptions of funerary customs. Children were "closely monitored" by elders. Children were sent on "short excursions" to search for protective spirits; they were usually required to bring back an object to prove that they had made the journey. As they grew older, until puberty, these journeys became longer. Each person was expected to acquire multiple spirits, because each had different powers.

At about the age of six, the children began to be instructed in "the legends of the tribe and family history…, tribal ways and tribal laws." At eight or nine, they learned to swim and to run long distances; boys were taught to make and use weapons and fishing gear, while girls started to learn plant lore and tanning, as well as how to care for young children, maintain dwellings, and prepare meals.

Sinixt religion was mainly "for harnessing power." The sun, the stars, the water, and the different animals (especially the salmon and coyote) each had different powers.

The whole tribe was led by one head chief (ilmi wm), but each smaller village of 50–200 had a local chief, whom they called a "thinker". These "thinkers" would come together to form a council.

The Sinixt were a matrilocal people, with newly married couples living with the wife's family rather than the husband's.

=== Late Precontact smallpox/instability ===
There is historical evidence suggesting that the Sinixt were heavily depopulated by one or two smallpox epidemics that preceded the arrival of Scottish and Métis fur-traders of the North West Company. The epidemic of 1781 was likely the biggest single outbreak, with accounts of that epidemic describing a mortality rate up to 80%. David Thompson and other early traders noticed the pock-marked faces of older Sinixt and heard oral accounts of the epidemic. There is also evidence that the Sinixt were seriously affected by the major political upheavals that preceded the arrival of the Europeans.

The Ktunaxa (Kutenai) people who neighboured the Sinixt to the east were driven further into the mountains by the Blackfoot, who had obtained control of Ktunaxa territory in the foothills and northwestern plains. Ethnographic and historical evidence suggests the Ktunaxa and the Sinixt battled each other over the territory along the lower Kootenay River between the present cities of Nelson and Castlegar, British Columbia. The Ktunaxa were considered the intruders, and the dispute was reportedly ended after the Sinixt mounted a large-scale raid into (Lower) Ktunaxa Territory at the south end of Kootenay Lake. The Sinixt later renewed their historic peace with the Ktunaxa, and took common cause with them, the Kalispel, the Flathead, the Coeur d'Alene, the Spokane, the Nez Perce, and others against the Blackfoot. While the Sinixt never directly fought the Blackfoot as a group, it is very likely that individual Sinixt joined their Salishan neighbours (and the Ktunaxa) in war parties and buffalo hunts to the Western Plains. Reyes says they had ongoing skirmishes with the Blackfoot, from whom, according to him, they stole horses. They also took part with other regional peoples in the punitive expedition in 1838 against the St'at'imc of Seton Lake led by Nicola (Hwistesmexteqen), chief of the Nicola people. They were allied with the interior tribes led by the Nlaka'pamux, who assembled at Lytton (Camchin) during the Fraser Canyon War of 1858.

=== Fur trade, missionaries, and border dispute ===
The Sinixt and their allies had a very close relationship with the Hudson's Bay Company. They wintered near the major trading post at Colville for the first time in 1830-31, led by the Lower Sinixt chief See-Whel-Ken (died 1840). The Sinixt supported the company in its efforts to prevent American trappers and settlers from entering and taking over the territory. As fur traders, the Sinixt were among the most prolific of all the First Nations who traded at Fort Colvile.

In 1837, Jesuit missionaries arrived in the area. St. Paul's Mission at Kettle Falls was constructed with the help of Colville and Sinixt labor. According to Reyes, it was in the 1840s that the Sinixt experienced a major die-off, shrinking from about 3,000 to about 400 during the period of chief Kin-Ka-Nawha, nephew of See-Whel-Ken. In addition to suffering diseases and incursions on their land, they found the salmon runs began to diminish because of the development of commercial fisheries at Astoria, Oregon near the mouth of the Columbia River. Some saw the die-off as a failure of the powers of their traditional religion; Kin-Ka-Nawha was among the eventual converts to Catholicism.

=== One people, two countries ===
When the United States gained formal control of the Oregon Country south of the 49th Parallel in 1846, some Sinixt remained in American territory near Kettle Falls, where Fort Colville continued to operate. Kettle Falls (or just above it) was essentially the southern boundary of Sinixt Territory, and was shared with the Colville people. They were traditionally close to the Colville people, who celebrated the Sinixt arrival at the falls during fishing season with a three-day dance. The tribes had a three-day dance at the end of their season.

In the wake of the partition, the Hudson's Bay Company created Fort Shepherd, British Columbia, just upstream from the confluence of the Pend d'Oreille and Columbia Rivers, which was very near the border, in order to serve their former clients and also maintain a post on British territory. Adjacent Sinixt territory in British Columbia remained in the hands of the Sinixt. As late as the 1860s, Sinixt leaders still equated British title in their Northern territory as signifying Sinixt sovereignty. When Fort Shepherd was abandoned by the Hudson's Bay Company, for example, it was left in Sinixt hands.

=== Gold and silver rushes ===
Prospectors began entering Sinixt territory in British Columbia in the 1850s and 1860s. Nevertheless, the Sinixt managed to maintain effective control over their northern traditional territory through the 1850s, 1860s, and 1870s, despite some conflict. While often accommodating white interests, they continued to claim ownership in British Columbia, and resisted the American miners, sometimes by force. In 1865, Sinixt blocked 200 miners and mining activities at the confluence of the Columbia and Kootenay rivers in an attempt to protect their hunting and fishing rights as promised by the Crown as related by Gold Commissioner J.C Haynes in a letter to the then acting colonial government in Victoria. Haynes reported in colonial correspondence that the local Indian (Sinixt) Chief expressed his grievances to mining in the region on at least two separate occasions and that the Hudson's Bay Company had promised royalties from mining in the area.

However, their reduced numbers resulted in the Sinixt being unable to control development of the area as it was flooded with miners during a second mineral rush in the 1880s and 1890s. Several boomtowns were erected throughout the West Kootenay and Boundary Country regions. The majority of Sinixt continued to live in Washington State on the Colville Reservation. Nevertheless, a number of Sinixt remained permanently in Canada during the first half of the 20th century. Many others also returned to their ancestral land in B.C., to hunt and fish during the summer months, well into the 20th Century.

Kin-Ka-Nawha resigned his role as chief as an old man. He was succeeded by Joseph Cotolegu, with Andrew Aorpaghan (Chief Edwards) and James Bernard (c. 1870–1935) as subchiefs. They would succeed him, in turn, as leaders.

== Colville Confederated Tribes ==
On the U.S. side, the Colville Confederated Tribes—now the Confederated Tribes of the Colville Reservation—were formally established in 1872. They were forced to become wards of the government on the Colville Reservation. It was at this time that the name Sinixt or Sin Aikst was dropped in favor of Lakes, apparently at the behest of the U.S. government.

Initially, the Confederated Tribes were given a reservation east of the Columbia River. Three months later it was taken away because white settlers wanted it, and they were given a comparably large tract on the west side of the river on inferior land. Initially, this reservation extended all the way to the Canada–US border, but the northern half was taken away in 1892, which separated it from Sinixt traditional territory in British Columbia; in addition, as more tribes lost their land, the shrinking reservation had to absorb yet more people. Even then, they had to deal with incursions of miners, homesteaders, and settlers such as the Doukhobors, who arrived from Russia in 1912.

In 1900, Aropaghan, over James Bernard's objection, agreed to have the land divided into individual allotments rather than held in common; he also agreed to include "half breeds" equally in the allocation.

Bernard journeyed three times to Washington, D.C., on behalf of his people: first in 1890 as interpreter for Chief Smitkin of the Colvilles, then in 1900 with Chief Lot and Chief Barnaby to negotiate the reservation boundaries, and finally in 1921 as chair of a delegation of the Confederated Tribes.

== Grand Coulee Dam ==
Until the construction of Grand Coulee Dam, the Lower Sinixt continued to fish in their traditional manner at Kettle Falls. They continued to elect a Salmon Chief. They fished with baskets on poles that caught the salmon who were not strong enough to clear the falls, and also with spears that had detachable tips, like a harpoon. Reyes sees this as the end of the traditional life of the Colville and Lakes: "After the concrete was poured into the steel framework to form the base of the dam, the great salmon runs ended. … It brought to a close a great tradition that had existed for centuries. From that day on… there was always a shortage of food. The bands dispersed… the great days of the Sin-Aikst were over." A few years later, rising waters from the dam also engulfed the largely Sinixt community of Inchelium, Washington on the banks of the Columbia, which had to be relocated, further disrupting even remnants of their traditional way of life.

=== Return to Canada ===
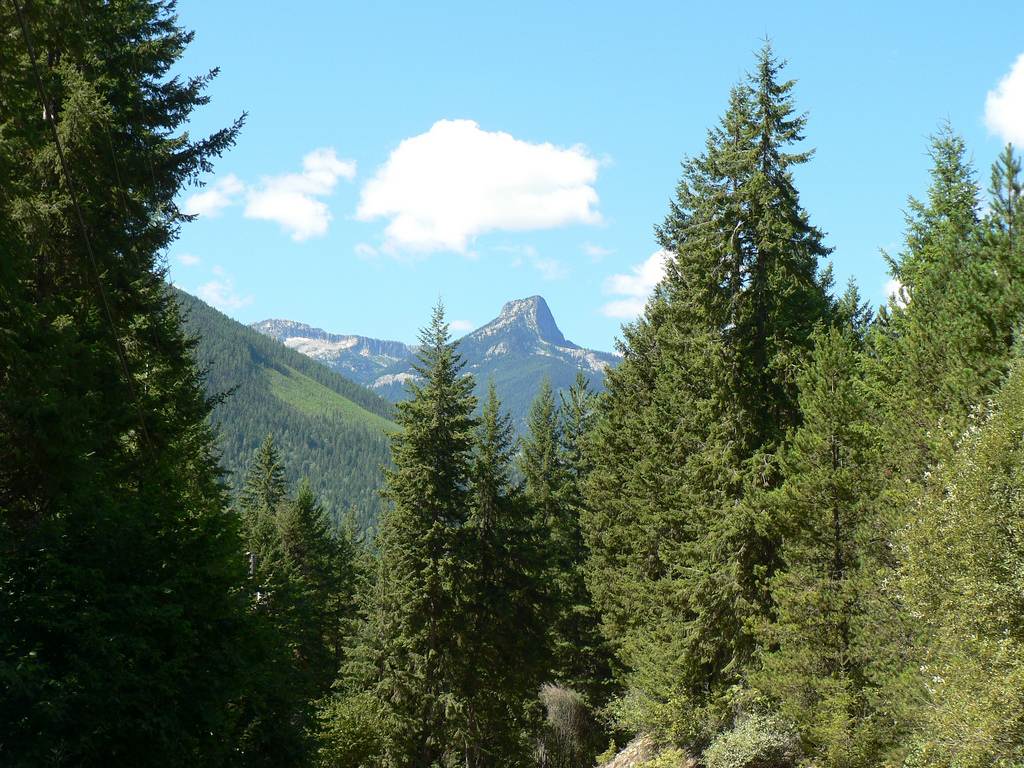
Frog Mountain in the Slocan Valley is sacred to Sinixt People

In her book, Keeping the Lakes Way, B.C. author Paula Pryce relates stories shared with her by Sinixt elders living in Washington State about visiting "the Northern Territory" from time to time after the extinction, "to pick berries, trade fish and visit sacred sites."

A permanent Sinixt presence was re-established in British Columbia during the late 1980s when, following direction by an Elder, a number of Sinixt descendants returned to the Slocan Valley to protest road building affecting an important village site, now called the Vallican Heritage Site. A bridge being built at Vallican resulted in a road being placed very near the large pithouse village and ancient burial site. Since 1989, a permanent Sinixt presence continues in the Slocan Valley, with local members overseeing the repatriation of remains and playing an increasing role in local affairs.

=== Archaeology ===
Publication in the early 21st century of archaeological work has suggested the traditional society was complex. This is in line with historic, ethnographic, and contemporary Sinixt accounts of a socially and economically advanced society. Pithouses in the Slocan Valley are among the earliest very large houses of this type, with some having diameters of over 20 metres (66 feet). The Slocan Narrows site also included some of the most recent very large pithouses. This and other evidence of a hierarchical and stratified society has led a leading scholar to state that the Sinixt's society was among the most complex of the entire region. Major hydroelectric projects along the Columbia and Kootenay rivers resulted in the flooding of many graveyards and the majority of Sinixt village sites, preventing excavation and study of these historic areas.

== Language ==
The Sinixt speak their own distinct dialect of the Okanagan language known endonymically as n̓səl̓xčin̓ (Salish people's language). Despite strong similarities with other Okanagan languages, the Sinixt Nation on their website has stated that they wish to preserve all dialectic differences even if the differences are only minor.

== Status today ==
The Sinixt today live primarily on the Colville Indian Reservation in Washington, where they form part of the Confederated Tribes of the Colville Reservation, which has governmental recognition as an American Indian Tribe.

=== Legal extinction in Canada ===
Presently, some Sinixt people live in their traditional territory on the "Canadian side" of the 49th parallel, mainly in Vallican in the Slocan Valley, or scattered throughout neighbouring lands in the area now known as British Columbia. They are not recognized by the Canadian Government, and were officially declared "extinct" by Canada in 1956 under the provisions of the Indian Act. When asked about this extinction in 1995, Ron Irwin, then Minister of Indian Affairs and Northern Development, stated that "The Arrow Lakes Band ceased to exist as a band for the purpose of the Indian Act... It does not, however, mean that the Sinixt ceased to exist as a tribal group." (August 9, 1995).

There were more than 250 Sinixt in Washington State at the time the Canadian Government declared the Sinixt extinct, along with other self-identifying Sinixt who had relocated with relatives to the Canadian part of the Okanagan region, some Sinixt descendants had joined the Spallumcheen Indian Band (Splats'in First Nation) of the Secwepemc (Shuswap) peoples.

=== Land claims in Canada ===
Members of Sinixt Nation have contested this extinction, and are taking steps to reclaim their land rights in British Columbia, where about 80% of their ancestral territory lies. Further complicating the question of Canadian territory claimed by the Sinixt are the overlapping claims of Ktunaxa traditional territory. The Ktunaxa Nation is currently negotiating a treaty with the Canadian federal government and the British Columbia government in the region, particularly regarding the lower Kootenay River valley around Castlegar and Nelson, and all lands within the curve of the Columbia as far north as Mica Dam and all of the Slocan Valley. In a 1994 presentation to the United Nations, Sinixt Appointed Spokesperson Marilyn James, along with the Official Vallican Heritage Site Caretaker, Robert Watt stated that "Neither our ancestors nor the members of Sinixt Nation have ever relinquished our inherent rights to any individual, any government or any other organization, including other native tribes or native nations.

Similar to the conflicting Ktunaxa land claims, territorial claims shown on maps published by the Okanagan Nation Alliance, of which the Colville Tribes is the American-side member, do not show Sinixt territory, instead showing the region as part of Okanagan traditional territory.

On July 28, 2008, "directors of the Sinixt Nation Society have filed a lawsuit claiming aboriginal title to Crown land in the Kootenays." Their lawyer David Aaron describes the intent of the action as "asserting a right (for the Sinixt) to be consulted, and to consent to all uses or dispositions of Crown land within that territory," and notes that private lands in the area will not be affected by the claim.

=== Sinixt as "Urban Indians" ===
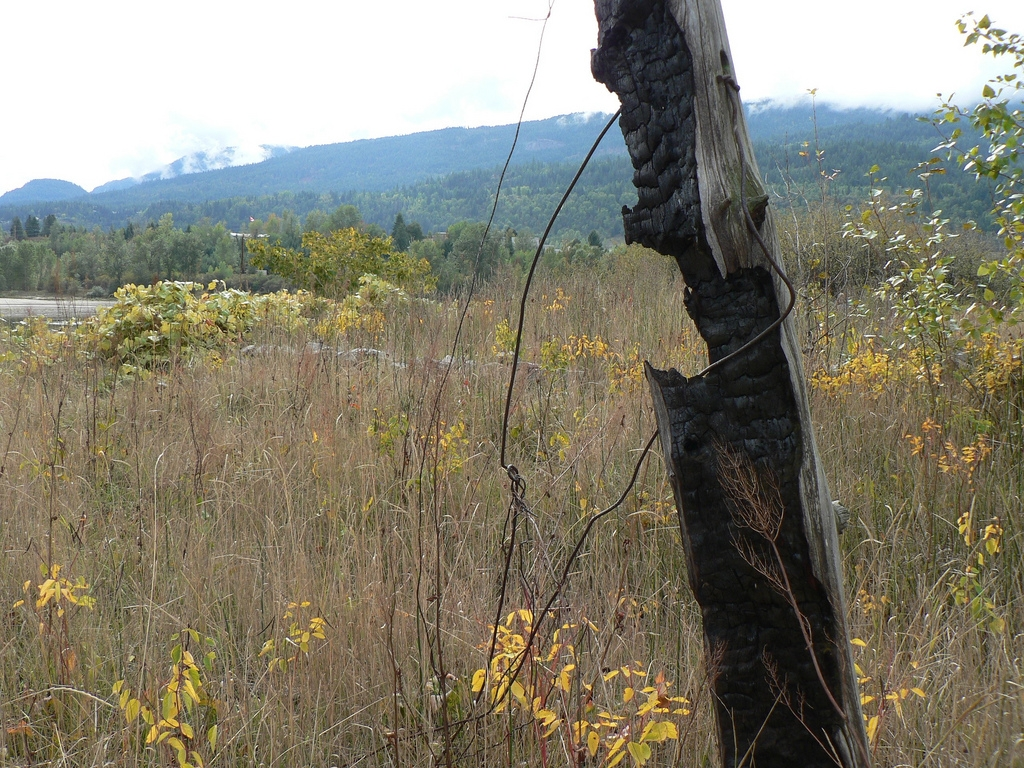
Kp'itl'els (Brilliant, BC), Sinixt village site on the confluence of the Kootenay and Columbia Rivers and historic home of the Alex Christian family

Many Lakes (Sinixt) feel that to live ethically one must follow a moral code which maintains a reciprocal relationship between humans, the land, and the realm of spirits in which the ancestors dwell. (Ancestor) Eva Orr called this 'keeping the Lakes' way.' The ideal of keeping the Lakes' way requires that people not take for their own gain but instead give back by following a cultural ethic of egalitarianism, reciprocity and peaceful living. Orr was acknowledged as spiritual leader—a klakwilt. Marilyn James states that Orr got her authority as a klakwilt by being culturally whole, linguistically connected to Sinixt culture, and bringing people to spirit. The Sinixt connection to their traditional territory is underscored by the wbuplak'n, the highest territorial and cultural legal doctrine of the Sinixt, which sets out their territorial responsibility to all land, water, plant, animal and cultural resources within the Sinixt territory.

Sinixt in the group's northern territory host a bi-weekly radio program, Sinixt Radio, on Nelson, B.C. Community Radio station CJLY-FM. The northern Sinixt also host an annual Barter Fair every fall in Vallican, B.C. The event features live music and performance, and it is set up to encourage local Bartering of goods and services.

=== Recognition of hunting rights ===
On 27 March 2017, the Provincial Court of British Columbia ruled in favor of Sinixt member Rick DeSautel, a resident of the Colville reservation, over a dispute with Canadian authorities on hunting in Canadian territory. The ruling effectively recognized the Sinixt as having rights in Canada, despite being declared extinct in 1956. On May 2, 2019, the BC Court of Appeal upheld Desautel's hunting rights. The Supreme Court of Canada agreed 24 October 2019, to hear the B.C. government's appeal of this decision. On April 23, 2021, the Supreme Court of Canada dismissed the appeal, upholding Mr. Desautel’s right to exercise Aboriginal rights under section 35 of the Constitution and recognizing the Lakes Tribe, a modern successor of the Sinixt, as an “Aboriginal people of Canada.”

== Notable Sinixt people ==
In Washington, one particular family of Sinixt have figured prominently among recent-day "urban Indians". Bernie Whitebear (1937–2000), a Seattle Indian rights activist and founder of several "urban Indian" organizations, was declared Washington state's "First Citizen of the Decade" in November 1997; his sister Luana Reyes (1933–2001) was, at the time of her death, deputy director of the U.S.'s 14,000-person Indian Health Services; and their brother Lawney Reyes (c.1931–2022) was a Seattle-based sculptor, designer, curator and author. Lawney, Luana and Bernie are descendants of Alex Christian, whose family lived at Kp'itl'els (Brilliant, B.C., near present-day Castlegar), a Sinixt village, for generations, until the Canadian Government sold their land to settlers.

Novelist and memoirist Mourning Dove, also known as Christine Quintasket, is described by anthropologist Paula Pryce as being of Sinixt-Skoyelpi descent, and Quintasket described her childhood and youth at Pia (now Kelly Hill, Washington) in the late 19th to early 20th century. Quintasket (Humishuma) was one of the first Native American women to publish a novel. Mourning Dove herself identified as Okanogan.

Joe Feddersen is a Sinixt/Okanagan sculptor, painter, photographer and mixed-media artist born in Omak, Washington.

== Population history ==
According to James Teit in year 1780 the Sinixt numbered at least 2,000 people and at least 20 villages.
