= Nespelem people =

Indigenous people of the Northwest Plateau

Nespelem
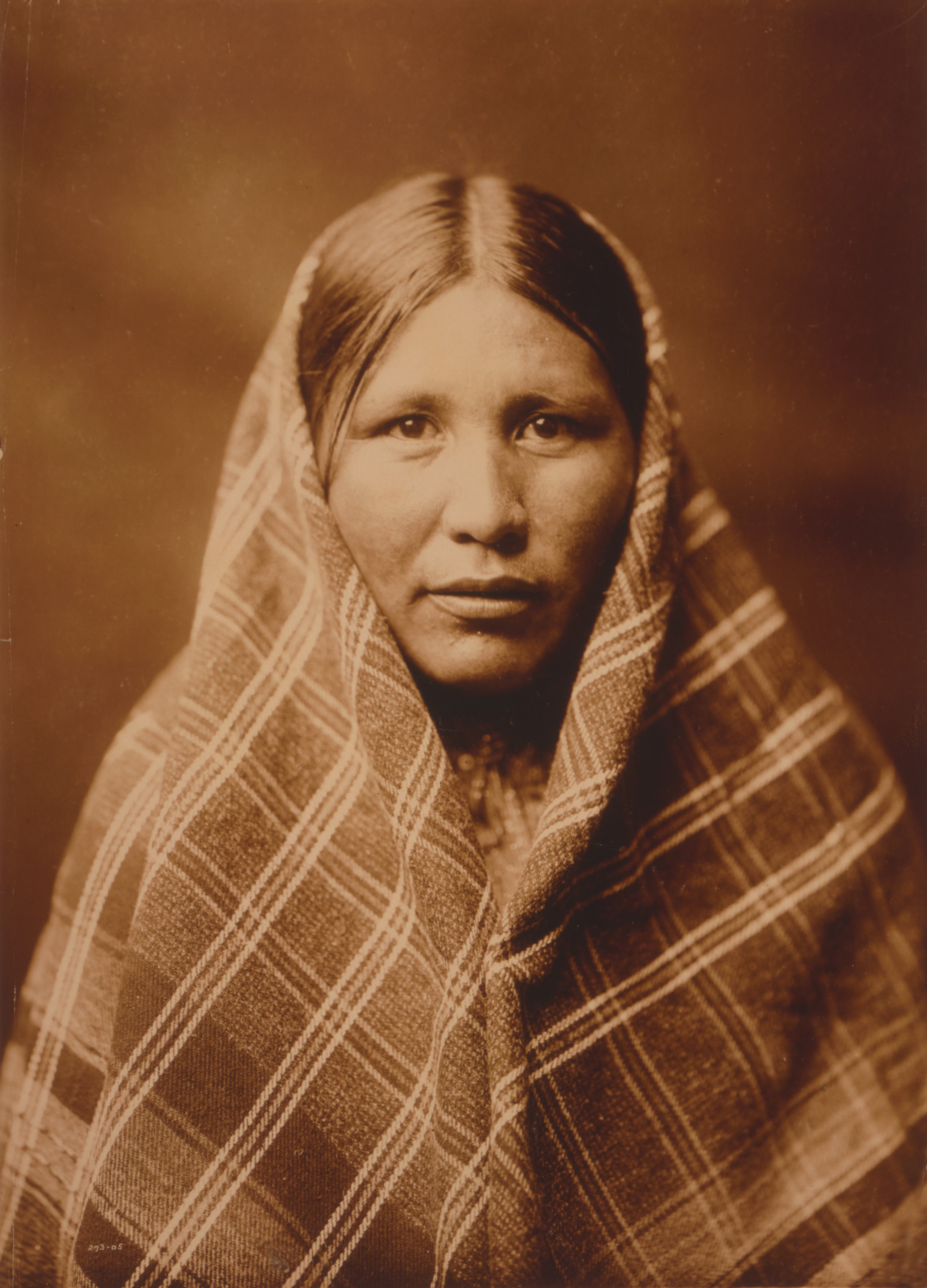
- Nespelem woman, photo by Curtis, 1911

Regions with significant populations
- United States (Washington)

Languages
- English, Salishan, Interior Salish

Related ethnic groups
- Colville, Sanpoil, Sinixt, Palus, Wenatchi, Entiat, Methow, Southern Okanagan, Sinkiuse-Columbia, and the Nez Perce of Chief Joseph's band

The Nespelem people are a Native American people in eastern Washington. They are an Indigenous people of the Northwest Plateau. Today, Nespelem people are enrolled in the Confederated Tribes of the Colville Reservation, a federally recognized tribe.

They lived primarily near the banks of the Nespelem River, an Upper Columbia River tributary, in an area now known as Nespelem, Washington, located on the Colville Indian Reservation.

Alternate spellings of their name include Nespelim or Nespilim.

== Ethnography ==
The Nespelem are an Interior Salish people, a designation that also includes the Okanagan, Sinixt, Wenatchi, Sanpoil, Spokan, Kalispel, Pend d'Oreilles, Coeur d'Alene, and Flathead peoples.

Ross classified Nespelem as one of the Okanagan tribes, while William Parkhurst Winans classified them as part of the Sanpoil.

In 1905, the United States Indian Office counted 41 Nespelim; in 1910, the census counted 46; in 1913, after a survey, the Office of Indian Affairs counted 43.

== Contact with European settlers ==
British colonialist and explorer David Thompson, on behalf of the North West Company in 1811, described several of the Native American tribes that he encountered while traveling along the Upper Columbia river (in present-day Canada and Washington State), thence along a tributary of the same river, the Sanpoil River, and continuing in places along the Pacific Northwest. In the Upper Columbia he mentions the Inspaelis [sic], being the Nespelem tribe, who warmly welcomed him and his party. As his interpreters, he made use of two Sanpoil scouts, who spoke a dialect of the Salishan tongue.

=== Customs and diet ===
Thompson mentions in his journal that the Nespelem wore shells as dress ornaments, and made their clothing from buffalo robes, and from skins of muskrat and black tailed deer, when they could be found; otherwise, they were scantly dressed. Their women painted their faces, and wore shells in their hair. A few donned copper ornaments. Their neighbors, the Simpoil [sic] Indians (Sanpoil), made houses of huts constructed with slight poles overlaid with mats of slight rushes. Such houses may have been a reflection of their own. Whenever sending off a party, members of the tribe (men, women and children) would come together, and after being entreated by their Chief to dance before the party, they would commence a solemn dance for several minutes by throwing their arms into the air, and clapping them in the air, before they lowered them. This dance was accompanied by a song chanted in measured cadence, the dance being repeated at three different intervals, and concluding with a blessing made by the Chief, who sent off the party along their way.

The Nespelem, like other Native American tribes in the Northwest, subsisted on roasted and dried salmon (which they often caught by the construction of a wier along the river), the boiled roots of bitterroot (Lewisia spp), the white root and Ectooway (Estooway) [sic] root (Helianthus tuberosus), as well as arrow wood berries. They supplemented their diet with an occasional marmot, or other game animals.

== Nespelem villages and bands ==
- Haimisahun, a summer settlement of the Suspiluk, on the north bank of Columbia River about a half mile above the mouth of Nespelem River.
- Masmasalimk, home of the Smasmasalimkuwa, approximately a mile and a half above Skik.
- Nekuktshiptin, home of the Snekuktshiptimuk, at the site of the present Condon's Ferry, on the north side of the river.
- Nspilem, home of the Snspiluk, on the lower Nespelem from the falls to the mouth of the river.
- Salkuahuwithl, home of the Wallakazam, across the river from the present town of Barry.
- Skik, about a mile above Salkuahuwithl on the same side of the river.
- Skthlamchin, fishing grounds of the Salkuahuwithlau, across the river from the mouth of the Grand Coulee.
