= Sanpoil =

Indigenous people of the Northwest Plateau

.n.selixtcl'n

Regions with significant populations
- United States (Washington)

Languages
- English, Okanagan language

Religion
- Roman Catholic; Native American Religions; Including Dreamer Church; mixed Christian-Native Belief (Shaker Church, etc.); other Christian

Related ethnic groups
- Colville, Nespelem, Sinixt, Palus, Wenatchi, Entiat, Methow, Southern Okanagan, Sinkiuse-Columbia, and the Nez Perce of Chief Joseph's band

The Sanpoil are a Native American people of the U.S. state of Washington. They are one of the Interior Salish peoples and are one of the 12 bands of the Confederated Tribes of the Colville Reservation, a federally recognized tribe.

The Sanpoil are Interior Salish Native Americans, a designation that also includes the Okanagan, Sinixt, Lakes, Wenatchee, Nespelem, Spokane, Kalispel, Pend d'Oreilles, Coeur d'Alene, and Flathead peoples. Indian agent William Parkhurst Winans classified the Nespelem as part of the Sanpoil. The Sanpoil and Nespelem share many cultural and linguistic traits.

== Name ==
The name Sanpoil comes from the Okanagan [snpʕ^{w}ílx], "gray as far as one can see". It has been folk-etymologized as coming from the French sans poil, "without fur". The Yakama people know the tribe as Hai-ai'-nlma or Ipoilq. The Sanpoil call themselves Nesilextcl'n, .n.selixtcl'n, probably meaning "Salish speaking," and N'pooh-le, a shortened form of the name.

== Territory ==
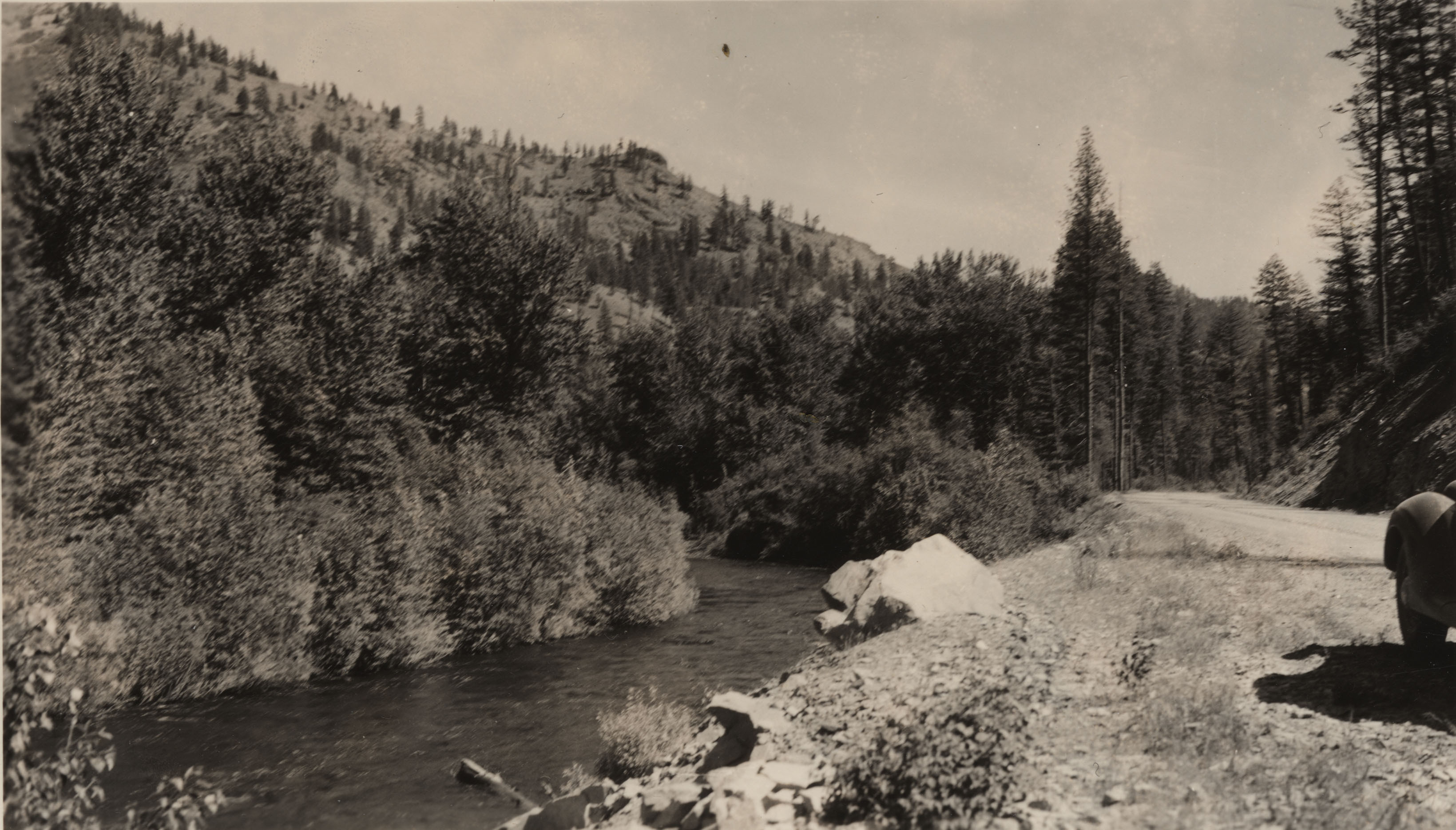
Sanpoil River before 1941

Since the 17th century the Sanpoil flourished with a many villages along the Sanpoil River and Nespelem River, tributaries of the Columbia River Later, the tribe was placed on Sanpoil and Colville Reservations in Washington state.

== History ==
The Sanpoil had a semi-democratic system of government with various chiefs representing each community within the tribe. Chiefs were not hereditary. In the 19th and early 20th centuries, United States government officials began recognizing one chief at a time.

The Sanpoil Tribe was incorporated into the Colville Confederation by executive order from the president of the United States after strong recommendation from the Indian agents noting the Sanpoil's relatively peaceful nature toward others, notably Euro-American settlers.

In 1905, the United States Indian Office counted 324 Sanpoil and 41 Nespelem. In 1910, the Census counted 240 and 46. In 1913, after a survey, the Office of Indian Affairs counted 202 and 43.

== Language ==
Sanpoil is a dialect of the Colville-Okanagan language, which is Interior Salishan languages typical of Plateau nations, and related most closely to Salishan languages' eastern section.

== Historic Sanpoil towns ==
- Enthlukaluk, about 1.5 miles (2 km) north of the mouth of the river.
- Hahsulauk, home of the Shahsulauhuwa, near Plum.
- Hulalst, home of the S-hulalstu, at Whitestone, about 8 miles (13 km) above Npuiluk.
- Hwatsam, a winter camp, about 3 miles (5 km) above Snukeilt.
- Kakamkam, on the islands in the Sanpoil River a short distance above the mouth.
- Kathlpuspusten, home of the Kathlpuspustenak, about a mile above Plum, on the opposite side of the river.
- Ketapkunulak, on the banks of the Columbia just east of the Sanpoil River.
- Naak, home of the Snaakau, about a mile below Plum but on the north side of the river.
- Nhohogus, fishing grounds of the S-hulalstu.
- Npokstian, a winter camp, about 2 miles (3 km) above Hwatsam.
- Npuiluk, home of the Snpuiluk, at the mouth of Sanpoil River, made up of the following camps:
  - Snkethlkukwiliskanan, near the present landing of the Keller ferry;
  - a branch of the last called by the same name, several hundred yards north of the first between the cliff and the Sanpoil River, on the west side;
  - Kethltselchin, on the first bench above the Columbia, west of the Sanpoil River.
- Nthlahoitk, a winter camp of the Snpuiluk, about halfway between Skthlamchin and Naak.
- Saamthlk, home of the Saamthlk, on the opposite side of the river from Kathlpuspusten.
- Skekwilk, on the west side of Sanpoil River about a mile above the mouth.
- Snputlem, on the east bank of Sanpoil River, about 15 miles (24 km) above the mouth.
- Snukeilt, home of the Snukeiltk, on the west side of Columbia River about 2 miles (3 km) above the mouth of Spokane River.
- Tkukualkuhun, home of the Stkukualkuhunak, at Rodger's Bar just across the river from Hunters.
- Tsaktsikskin, a winter camp of the Snpuiluk, about a half mile below Naak. Wathlwathlaskin, home of the Swathlwathlaskink, 3 miles (5 km) up the river from Nthlahoitk.
