= Wenatchi =

Indigenous people of the Northwest Plateau

np̓əšqʷáw̓səxʷ

Regions with significant populations
- United States (Washington)

Languages
- English, Salishan, Interior Salish

Related ethnic groups
- Colville, Sanpoil, Nespelem, Palus, Sinixt, Entiat, Methow, Southern Okanagan, Sinkiuse-Columbia, and the Nez Perce of Chief Joseph's band

The Wenatchi people or Šnp̍əšqʷáw̉šəxʷi / Np̓əšqʷáw̓səxʷ ("People in the between") are Native Americans who originally lived near the confluence of the Columbia and Wenatchee Rivers in Central Washington state. Their language is Interior Salish (a variant of Salish). Traditionally, they ate salmon, starchy roots like camas and biscuitroot, berries, deer, sheep and whatever else they could hunt or catch. The river that they lived on, the Wenatchee River, had one of the greatest runs of salmon in the world prior to numerous hydroelectric dams being put in on the downstream Columbia, pollution and other issues, and was their main food source.

== History ==
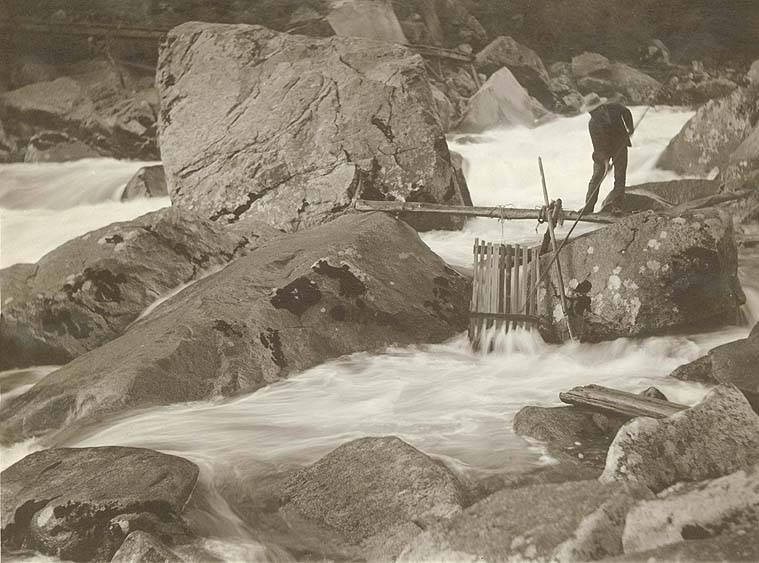
Historical photograph by B.C. Collier. Man holding spear stands on rocks in the river above a fish trap

The tribal name "Wenatchi" is of Yakama-Sahaptin origin, the neighboring Yakama named the "Wenatchapam Fishery" Winátsha and the particular Wenatchi Band at this place Winátshapam ("People at Winátsha"), the Wenatchi called this Band Sinpusqôisoh. Therefore they were called in historic times also "P'squosa/Pisquouse". The individually distinct Wenatchi bands, are the following:

- the Stsilámuh ("People at the Deep Water, i.e. Lake Chelan") at the outlet of Lake Chelan (Tsilán - "Deep Water")
- the Sintiátqkumuh ("People from the place of grassy water") along Entiat River (Ntiátq/Nt'yátkw/Nt'iátkw - "place of grassy water")
- the Siniálkumuh on the Columbia between Entiat River and Wenatchee River
- the Sinkumchímulh ("People at the mouth of [Wenatchee] River") at the mouth of the Wenatchee;
- the Sinhahamchímuh higher up on the Wenatchee; and
- the Sinpusqôisoh (already mentioned) at the forks of the Wenatchee, where the town of Leavenworth, Washington, now stands.

They are closely related by language with the Entiat and Chelan peoples and through marriage and culture with Upper Yakima bands.

Sometimes the Chelan (Ščəl̕ámxəxʷ - "People at the Deep Water, i.e. Lake Chelan") and Entiat were considered simply as another Wenatchi Bands; the Entiat (also known as: Inti-etook, Intietooks) - which called themselves Šntiyátkʷəxʷ (Sintia'tkumuk/Sintiatqkumuh) ("People from the place of grassy water/Gras in Water, i.e. Entiat River") and the Sinialkumuh Band of Entiat were often classed as "Wenatchi" or "P'squosa". Moreover, the Chelan people also described themselves as Šntiyátkʷəxʷ ("People from the place of grassy water/Gras in Water, i.e. Entiat River").

In 1931, a Powwow was held on the land of Mary Felix, a Wenatchi woman living in Yaksum Canyon in Cashmere, Washington. It's estimated that nearly 700 Native Americans attended, including 250 Wenatchi, many traveling from the Colville and Yakama reservations.

In 2024, the Colville Confederated Tribes acquired 11 acres of land near Cashmere along the Wenatchee River as part of an effort to reclaim ownership of ancestral lands.

== Wenatchapam Fishery ==
The Wenatchapam Fishery is an important cultural site for the Wenatchi people. The land is currently incorporated into Wenatchee National Forest at the confluence of the Wenatchee River and Icicle Creek near Leavenworth. The fishery was named as a reservation site in the Yakama treaty from the Walla Walla Council (1855), and the boundaries were surveyed and designated by Army personnel in subsequent years. Following the establishment and reallocation of lands of the Colville Indian Reservation, Wenatchi Chief John Harmelt was supported by Chief Joseph of the Nez Perce people in lobbying for federal protection of Wenatchi rights to the fishery. More white settlers moved to the area, infringing on the Wenatchi's claim to the land, and the Great Northern Railway was approved to build a route through the reserved land.

Another survey was commissioned in 1893, but federal agent L.T. Erwin, who was aligned with the settlers and railroad company, intervened in the process. He attempted to offer Chief Harmelt individual allotments in the mountains to the remaining Wenatchi people, however Harmelt insisted on consulting with his people before entering into a decision. In his absence, Erwin told the Yakama tribal leaders that the Wenatchi had sold their land rights, and the Yakama sold their share for $20,000.
