= Palouse people =

Indigenous people of the Northwest Plateau

Palouse
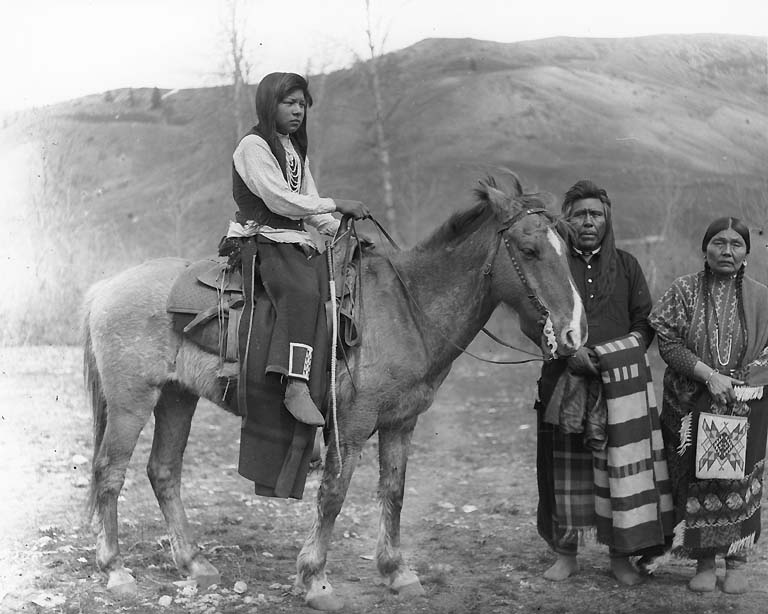
- Palouse-Colville Family (1905); University of Washington Digital Collections

Regions with significant populations
- United States (Washington) (Oregon) (Idaho)

Languages
- English, Salishan, Sahaptin

Related ethnic groups
- Colville, Sanpoil, Nespelem, Sinixt, Wenatchi, Entiat, Methow, Southern Okanagan, Sinkiuse-Columbia, and the Nez Perce of Chief Joseph's band

The Palouse /pəˈluːs/ or Palus are a Sahaptin tribe and an Indigenous peoples of the Northwest Plateau living in Washington, Oregon, and Idaho.

They are signatories of the Treaty of 1855 with the United States along with the Yakama. It was negotiated at the 1855 Walla Walla Council. Today, they are primarily enrolled in the federally recognized Confederated Tribes and Bands of the Yakama Nation, and some are enrolled in the Confederated Tribes of the Colville Reservation, the Confederated Tribes of the Umatilla Indian Reservation and Nez Perce Tribe.

== Ethnography ==
The people are one of the Sahaptin-speaking groups of Native Americans living on the Columbia Plateau in eastern Washington, northeastern Oregon, and North Central Idaho: these included the Nez Percé, Cayuse, Walla Walla, Umatilla and the Yakama.

The Palouse (Palus) territory extends from the confluence of the Snake and Clearwater Rivers in the east to the confluence of the Snake and Columbia Rivers in the west. It encompassed the Palouse River Valley up to Rock Lake in the north and stayed north of the Touchet River Valley in the south. To the north, their territory bordered the Sinkiuse-Columbia, Spokane, and Coeur d'Alene; to the east, their territory bordered the Nez Perce; to the south, the Cayuse and Walla Walla; and to the west, they bordered the eastern boundary of the Yakama and Wanapum territories. The Palouse (Palus) lived in three main regional bands, composed of several village-based groups:

- Upper Palouse (Palus) Band: often formed bilingual village communities with the Almotipu Band and Alpowna (Alpowai) Band of the Nez Perce people, the Lewis and Clark Expedition referred to them as Chopunnish (Nez Percé), their villages along the Clearwater River (from west to east) Pinăwăwi/Pinawa’wi (Penawawa) ("coming out of bushy area to fish"), Witkispe (Witkispu), Wawawi/Wawáwi (Wawawai) ("place of mosquitoes"), Alamotin/Alamo’tin (Almota) ("soaring flame") and Alpo’wa (Alpowa) ("total area of fishing") were identified by Americans and in treaties as "Nez Percé villages" and therefore their lands were included into the Nez Perce Indian Reservation; today part of the "Confederated Tribes of the Colville Reservation" and "Nez Perce Tribe". The "Pinăwăwi/Pinawa’wi (Penawawa) Palouse" were identified as Pinewewixpu (Pinăwăwipu) Nez Perce Band, the "Witkispe (Witkispu) Palouse" as Witkispu Nez Perce Band, the "Wawawi/Wawáwi (Wawawai) Palouse" as Wawawipu Nez Perce Band, the "Alamotin/Alamo’tin (Almota) Palouse" as Almotipu Nez Perce Band, and the "Alpo’wa (Alpowa) Palouse" as Alpowna (Alpowai) Nez Perce Band.

Middle Palouse (Palus) Band: lived along the Palouse River, Lower Clearwater River and along the Tucannon River, their main village Pa-luš-sa/Palus at the junction of Palouse and Snake River about 4 mi (6 km) downstream from the Palouse Falls (Aputaput - "Falling Water") gave its name to the entire Palouse tribe, often allies of the "Pikunan (Pikunin) Band" of the Nez Percé, the Lewis and Clark Expedition referred to them as the "Pelloatpallah (Nez Percé)", the majority are now part of the "Confederated Tribes and Bands of the Yakama Nation", a minority of the "Confederated Tribes of the Colville Reservation".

- Lower Palouse (Palus) Band: lived along the Lower Snake River to its confluence with the Columbia River near the present-day Tri-Cities metropolitan area; the Lewis and Clark Expedition referred to them as "Sokulks" and "Chymnapums"; later historians also identified them as "Nez Percé," now part of the "Confederated Tribes and Bands of the Yakama Nation".

The ancestral people were nomadic, following food sources through the seasons. The Palus people gathered with other native peoples for activities such as food-gathering, hunting, fishing, feasting, trading, and celebrations that included dancing, sports and gambling. They lived near other groups including the Nez Perce, Wanapum, Walla Walla, Umatilla and Yakama peoples.

The present tribal designation probably derives from the proper designation of the most populous of the three regional bands of the Palouse/Palus people - the ″Middle Palouse/Palus Band″ as Palúšpam - "people of Pa-luš-sa/Palus [one of their most important settlements]", the neighboring Nez Percé also called them Pa-loots-poo/Pelú`cpu/Peluutspu and the Yakama Palúuspam/Pelúuspem both meaning "people of Pa-luš-sa/Palus", their proper autonym was Naxiyamtama or Naha’ámpoo/Naha'u'umpu'u - “the river people”.

The people were expert horsemen. The term Appaloosa is probably a derivation of the term "A Palouse horse." They bred the horses for their distinct markings. In the latter half of the nineteenth century, the United States Army captured and slaughtered hundreds of tribal horses to cripple the tribe during the Indian Wars.

== History ==
In October 1805, Lewis and Clark met with the tribe, although most were away from the area for fall food-gathering and hunting. Lewis and Clark presented one of the expedition's silver peace medals to paramount Chief Kepowhan. The Diaries of the Corps of Discovery describe the people as a separate and distinct group from the Nez Percé.

After Kepowhan, during the decades 1830', 1840', 1850, Wattaiwattaihowlis (Kepowhan's son and probably principal chief), Kahlotus (known also as Quelaptip and Talatuche, chief of the Upper Palouse), Soei (chief of the Middle Palouse), Nehtalekin (called also Hahtalekin the Elder), Tilcoax (chief of the Lower Palouse), Hinmahtutekekaikt alias "James" (one among the first to be Christianized, friend to Henry H. Spalding and Marcus Whitman, often associated to the Nimiipu band of Hollolsotetote), were the leaders until the Isaac I. Stevens Treaty in 1855, when the Palouse refused to take part but sent, as observers, Kahlotus (already a good friend to Marcus Whitman), Tilcoax (a war chief) and Slyotze; "Old" Hathalekin and Tilcoax led the Palouse warriors against the U.S. troops during the Cayuse's uprising in 1847–1848, defeating col. Cornelius Gilliam and his "Oregon Volunteers" on the Tucannon Creek (March 14–15, 1848). In 1858 Tilcoax led again the Palouse warriors in the "Skitswish (Coeur d'Alene) War": in May 1858 the Palouses succeeded in taking possession of a herd of Army's horses, but, on September 8, 1858, their own herd of 800 horses was slaughtered by col. George Wright's soldiers, and they surrendered.

Husishusis Kute, chief of the Wawawai Palouse, and "Young" Hathalekin (also known as Taktsoukt Jlppilp), war-chief, led a small Palouse band as allies of the last free Nimiipu of Heinmot Tooyalaket alias "Chief Joseph"; "Young" Hathalekin died fighting on August 9, 1877, at Big Hole; Husishusis Kute surrendered with Heinmot Tooyalaket on October 5, 1877.

== Notable historical Paulous leaders ==
- Tilcoax ("Wolf Necklace") led the Palouse warriors during the Skitswish (Coeur d'Alene) war in 1858, fighting against Maj. Steptoe and Col. Wright troops.
- Husishusis Kute (Husis Husis Kute, Hush-hush-cute - “Bald Head”, “Naked Head”), was leader and tooat — Medicine man or Shaman, or Prophet — of the Wawawai Band. Its territory was along the Snake River below Lewiston, 50 miles up the Snake River from where the Palouse enters it.

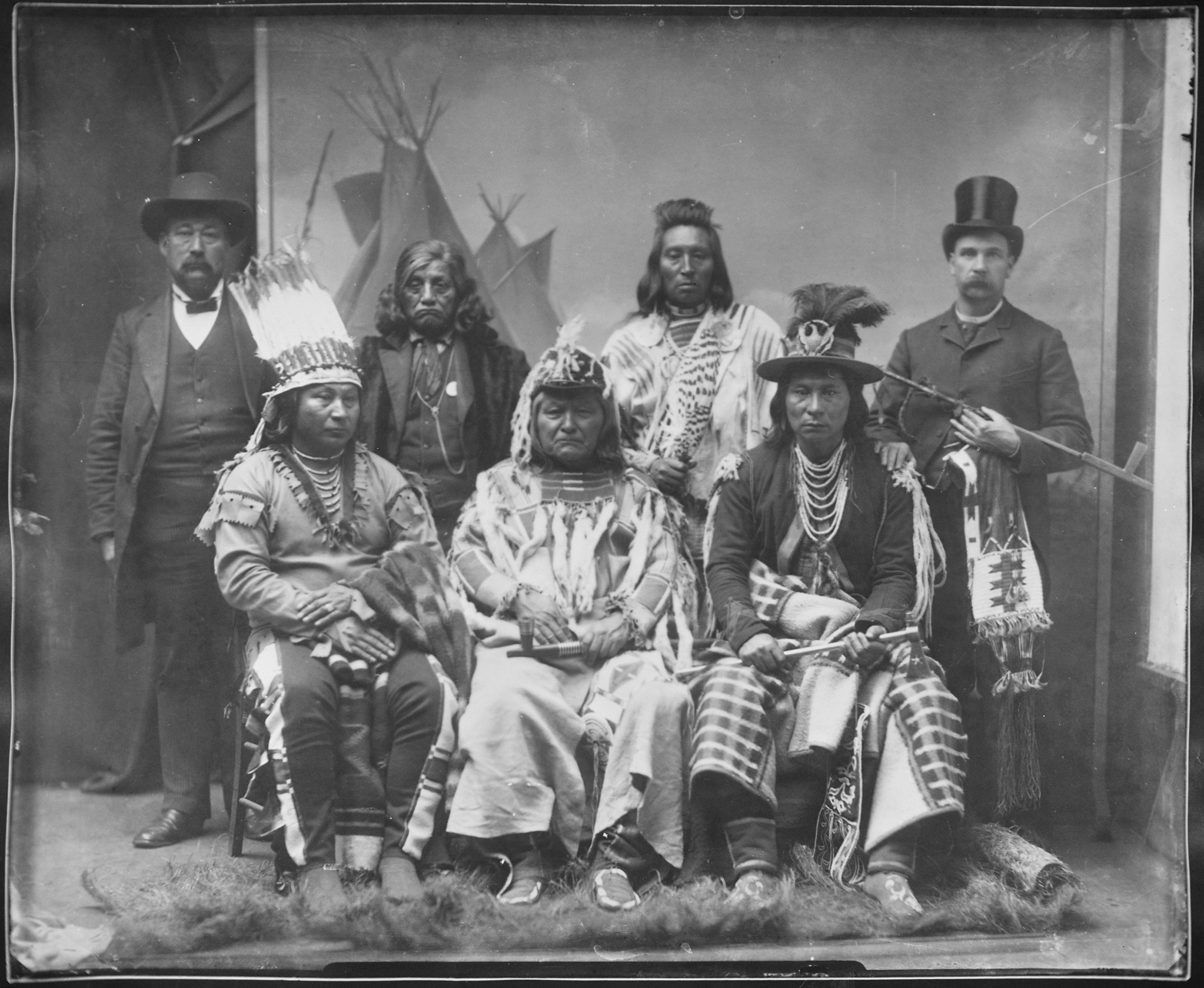
Sahaptin Tribal delegates in Washington D.C.

- Hahtalekin (also known as Taktsoukt Jlppilp - “Echo” or “Red Echo”), chief of the Palus Band (or Palus proper), who lived at the confluence of the Snake and Palouse rivers. His band were all of the buffalo-hunter-class. During the flight with the Nez Perce, his following was made up of 16 men.

== Bibliography ==
- Chalfant, Stuart A. (1974). Ethnohistorical reports on aboriginal land use and occupancy: Spokan Indians, Palus Indians, Columbia Salish, Wenatchi Salish. Garland Publishing. ISBN 0-8240-0782-4.

Note: S. A. Chalfant's report was presented before the United States Indian Claims Commission as docket no. 161, 222, 224.

- Manring, Benjamin Franklin (1912). The conquest of the Coeur d'Alenes, Spokanes and Palouses: the expeditions of Colonels E.J. Steptoe and George Wright against the "northern Indians" in 1858. Inland Printing Company.
- Sprague, Roderick (1998). Handbook of North American Indians. Volume 12. Plateau. Smithsonian Institution. pp. 352–359. ISBN 0-16-049514-8.
- Trafzer, Clifford E., and Richard D. Scheuerman. (1986). Renegade Tribe: The Palouse Indians and the Invasion of the Inland Pacific Northwest. Washington State University Press. ISBN 0-87422-028-9.
- Wright, G., Col. (1858). Great battle of the Spokane plains, Washington Territory. Philadelphia Press.

Note: One and a half columns of text published in the September 23, 1858 issue of The Press, Philadelphia. The newspaper story quotes dispatches sent by Col. G. Wright regarding an "expedition against Northern Indians, camp on the Spokane River, (W.T.), one and a half miles below the Falls, September 6, 1858."

== See also ==
- Spokane-Coeur d'Alene-Paloos War
- Yakima War
- Cayuse War
- Okanagan Trail
