= Syilx =

Indigenous people of the Northwest Plateau in Canada and the United States

syilx
- Syilx flag

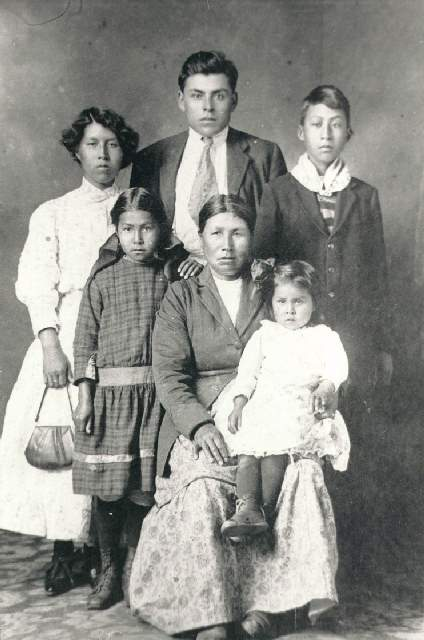
- Okanagan (Syilx) members, c. 1918. Back Left: Marriette Gregoire. Back Center: Joe Abel. Back Right: Tommy Gregoire. Left: Celestine Lewis (child). Center: Millie Williams. Right: Mary Abel (toddler).

Regions with significant populations
- Canada (British Columbia), United States (Washington)

Languages
- English, Okanagan (n̓səl̓xcin)

Related ethnic groups
- Colville, Sanpoil, Nespelem, Sinixt, Wenatchi, Entiat, Methow, Palus, Sinkiuse-Columbia, and the Nez Perce of Chief Joseph's band

The Syilx (Salishan pronunciation: [sjilx]) people, also known as the Okanagan, Suknaqinx, Swknaqínx, or Okinagan people, are a First Nations and Native American people whose traditional territory spans the Canada–US boundary in Washington state and unceded British Columbia in the Okanagan Country region. They are part of the Interior Salish ethnological and linguistic grouping. The Okanagan are closely related to the Spokan, Sinixt, Nez Perce, Pend Oreille, Secwepemc and Nlaka'pamux peoples of the same Northwest Plateau region.

== History ==
At the height of Okanagan Syilx culture, about 3,000 years ago, it is estimated that 12,000 people lived in this valley and surrounding areas. The Syilx employed an adaptive strategy, moving within traditional areas throughout the year to fish, hunt, or collect food, while in the winter months, they lived in semi-permanent villages of kekulis, a type of pithouse. In Nsyilxcn, "pit house" is q̓ʷc̓iʔ.

When the Oregon Treaty partitioned the Pacific Northwest in 1846, the portion of the tribe remaining in what became Washington Territory reorganized under Chief Tonasket as a separate group from the majority of the Syilx, whose communities remain in Canada. The Okanagan Tribal Alliance, however, incorporates the American branch of the Syilx. The latter are part of the Confederated Tribes of the Colville, a multi-tribal government in Washington state.

The bounds of Syilx territory are roughly the basin of Okanagan Lake and the Okanagan River, plus the basin of the Similkameen River to the west of the Okanagan valley, and some of the uppermost valley of the Nicola River. The various Syilx communities in British Columbia and Washington form the Okanagan Nation Alliance, a border-spanning organization which includes American-side Syilx residents in the Colville Indian Reservation, where the Syilx are sometimes known as Colvilles.

The Upper Nicola Indian Band, a Syilx group of the Nicola Valley, which was at the northwestern perimeter of Okanagan territory, are known in their dialect as the Spaxomin, and are joint members in a historic alliance with neighbouring communities of the Nlaka'pamux in the region known as the Nicola Country, which is named after the 19th-century chief who founded the alliance, Nicola. This alliance today is manifested in the Nicola Tribal Association.

== Governments ==
- Okanagan Nation Alliance
  - Westbank First Nation (Westbank) (tqłəníw̓t/sn̓qatqłəníw̓t)
  - Lower Similkameen Indian Band (Keremeos) (n̓iʔxʷín̓aʔ)
  - Upper Similkameen Indian Band (Keremeos) (tk̓r̓miw̓s)
  - Osoyoos Indian Band (swiw̓s)
  - Penticton Indian Band (sn̓pin̓tktn̓)
  - Okanagan Indian Band (Vernon) (n̓k̓maplqs)
  - Upper Nicola Indian Band (Douglas Lake) - also part of the Nicola Tribal Association (spax̌mn̓)
  - Confederated Tribes of the Colville (sx̌ʷy̓ʔiłpx sqlxʷúlaʔxʷ)

== Language ==
The language of the Syilx people is Nsyilxcn. "Syilx" is at the root of the language name Nsyilxcn, surrounded by a circumfix indicating a language. When writing Nsyilxcn, no capital letters are used. Nsyilxcn is an Interior Salish language that is spoken across the Canada–United States border in the regions of southern British Columbia and northern Washington. This language is currently endangered and has less than 50 fluent speakers remaining.

For learners in K-12 system, there are six band-operated schools and three community schools that teach the nsyilxcn language.

- sensisyustən School, Westbank First Nation
- ntamɬqən School, Lower Similkameen Indian Band
- sənpaqcin School, Osoyoos Indian Band
- outma sqilxʷ School, Penticton Indian Band
- nk̓mapəlqs iʔ snmaʔmayaʔtn k̓əl sqilxʷtət, Okanagan Indian Band
- nkʷala School, Upper Nicola Indian Band
- Waterfall School, Omak, non-profit organization in Colville
- Pascal Sherman Indian School, Omak, federally funded Indian school in Colville
- Salish School of Spokane, non-profit corporation in Colville
- snp̓aʔaxʷíltn Immersion School, Spokane, non-profit organization in Colville

== Population history ==
According to James Teit the "Okanagon Indians" included the "Okanagon", "Sanpoil", "Colville", and "Lake" peoples as they all spoke Nsyilxcn or Nsəlxcin. He estimated their historical population to be at least 8,500 though the likelihood of 10,000 or more is reasonable based on the information he received from tribal members. They estimated their population to have been at least four times what it was at the turn of the 20th century. A 1903 Canadian report and a 1905 American report collectively estimated the population at 2,579.

== See also ==
- Okanagan Trail
- Nicola (Okanagan leader)
- Mourning Dove (author)
