= Colville people =

Native American people of the Northwest Plateau

Colville
sx̌ʷýʔłpx
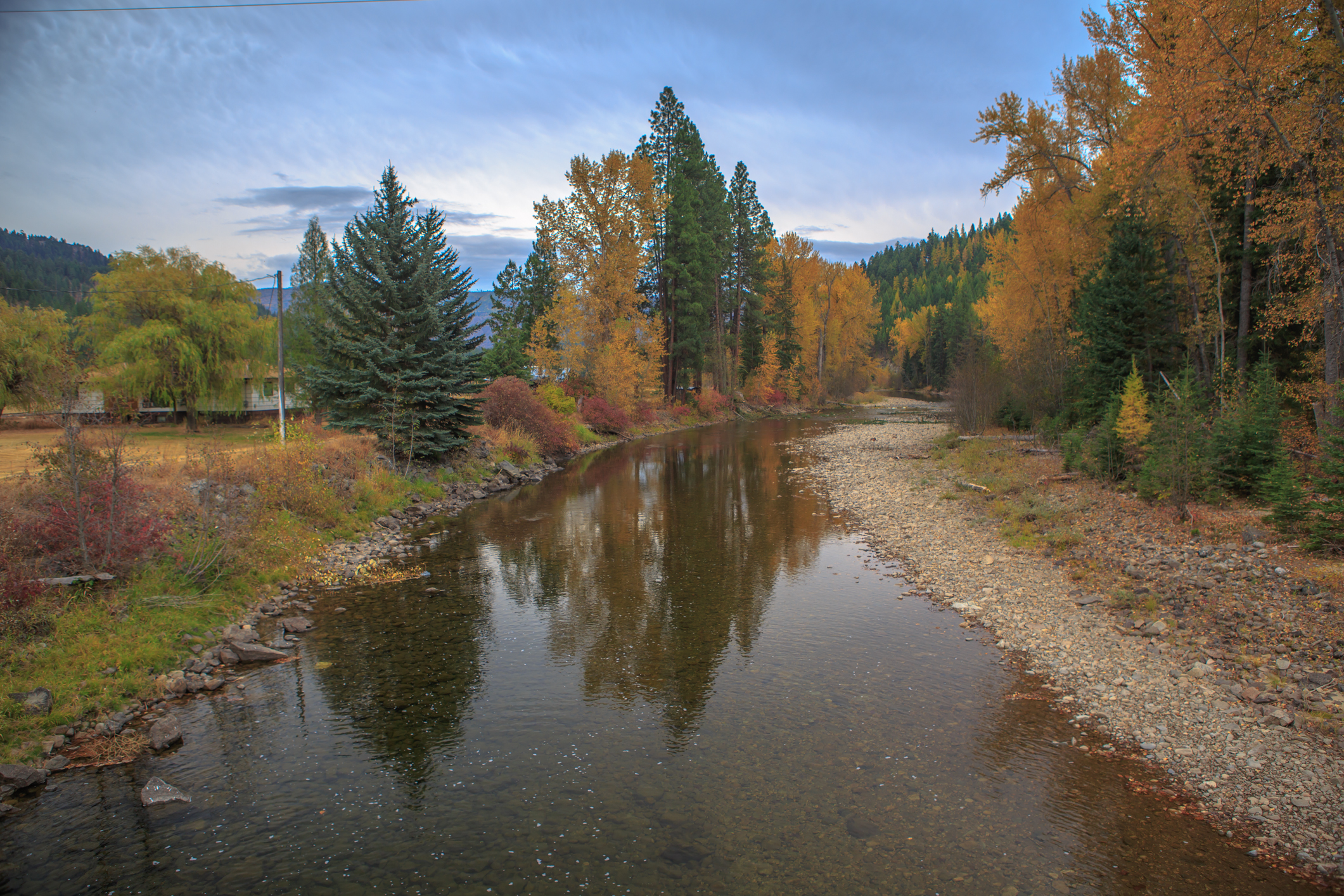
- Historical Colville homelands were along the Kettle and Columbia rivers in Washington

Total population
- 3,782 (1990)

Regions with significant populations
- United States (Washington)

Languages
- Nsyilxcən

Related ethnic groups
- other Interior Salish peoples

The Colville people (nselxcin: sx̌ʷýʔłpx) are an Interior Salish people and an Indigenous people of the Northwest Plateau.

Today, Colville people are primarily enrolled in the Confederated Tribes of the Colville Reservation, a federally recognized tribe; however, some Colville descendants belong to the Columbia Rivers Indians, an unrecognized tribe.

== Name ==
The name Colville comes from association with the Colville River and Fort Colville, named after Andrew Colvile of the Hudson's Bay Company. Earlier, outsiders often called them Scheulpi, Chualpay, or Swhy-ayl-puh; the French traders called them Les Chaudières ("the Kettles") in reference to Kettle Falls. The neighboring Coeur d'Alene called them Sqhwiyi̱'ɫpmsh and the Spokane knew them as Sxʷyelpetkʷ. Their name in nselxcin, sx̌ʷýʔłpx, refers to "sharp pointed trees".

== Territory ==
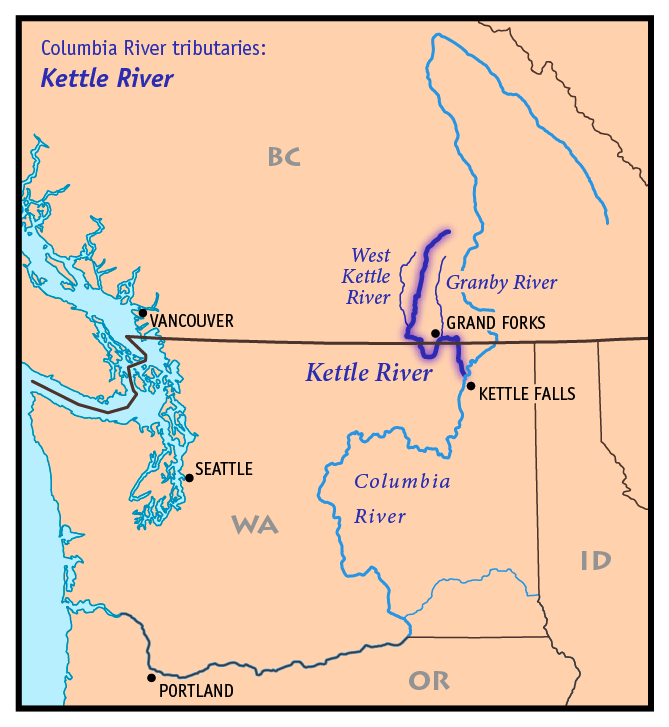
Map of Kettle. Colville people historically lived near the confluence of the Kettle and Columbia rivers

In the 18th century, the Colville tribe lived around the Kettle and Columbia rivers in northeastern Washington. They lived between Kettle Falls and the town of Hunters. Their territory went as far north as Almond Creek, where it drains into the Granby River. In the northwest, it reached the divergence of West Fork Cedar Creek from Cedar Creek, down to Marias creek. In the west, it reached Timber Ridge, and in the southwest, it reached Thirteenmile Mountain, down to the Twin Lakes. It extended as far south as Hunters, and followed the Colville River to the east.

The tribe's history is tied with Kettle Falls, an important salmon fishing resource, and an important post of the Hudson's Bay Company, which brought the advantages and disadvantages of contact with people of European heritage.

== History ==
=== 18th century ===
A smallpox epidemic in 1782 killed many Colville people. With the arrival of Europeans and Euro-Americans in their territory, Colville people entered the fur trade.

=== 19th century ===
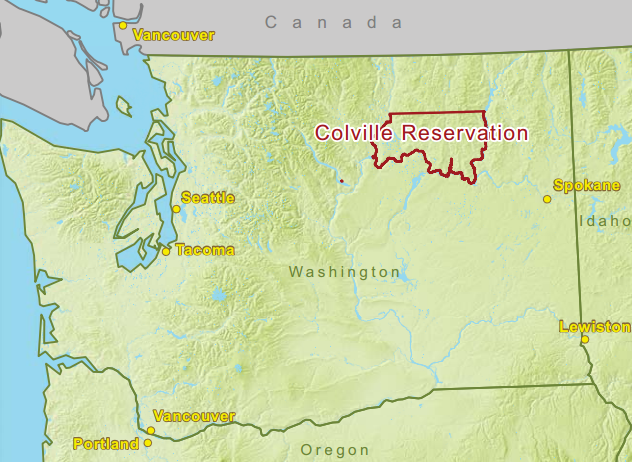
Colville Indian Reservation in Washington State

Christian missionaries entered Colville territory in 1838. In 1846, the Jesuit St. Paul's Mission was established. Through its influence nearly all the upper Columbia tribes were converted to Christianity.

In 1872, the Colville tribe was relocated to the Colville Indian Reservation, an Indian reservation in eastern Washington. It is inhabited and managed by the Confederated Tribes of the Colville Reservation, which is a federally recognized tribe comprising twelve bands. The twelve bands are the Methow, Okanogan, Arrow Lakes, Sanpoil, Colville, Nespelem, Chelan, Entiat, Moses-Columbia, Wenatchi, Nez Perce, and Palus.

== 20th century ==
In 1938, the Confederated Tribes of the Colville Reservation was formed under the 1936 Indian Reorganization Act. They reclaimed more of their historical lands in 1956.

== Population ==
Mooney (1928) estimated the number of the Colville at 1,000 as of 1780, but Lewis and Clark placed it at 2,500, a figure also fixed upon by Teit (1930). In 1870, there were 616; in 1900, 298;

== Language ==
The Colville language or N̓x̌ʷʔiłpcən is one of six dialects of Colville-Okanagan, a language spoken by many Indigenous nations in the Interior Plateau including the Syilx, Methow, Sanpoil (Nesilextcl'n), and Nespelem.

Together with Wenatchee-Columbian, Spokane-Kalispel-Bitterroot, and Coeur d'Alene, Colville-Okanagan belong to the four Southern Interior Salishan languages of the Plateau.

== Notable Colville people ==
- Jim Boyd, musician
- Mourning Dove (author), author
- Joe Feddersen, artist
- Kimberly Norris Guerrero, actress
- Lawney Reyes artist, curator, and memoirist
