= St. Paul Roman Catholic Church (St. Paul, Oregon) =

Historic church in Oregon, United States

- U.S. National Register of Historic Places
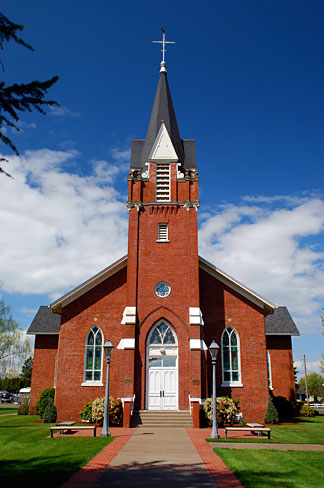
- Location: St. Paul, Oregon
- Coordinates: 45°12′40″N 122°58′42″W
- Area: French Prairie
- Built: 1846
- Architectural style: Gothic Revival
- NRHP reference No.: 79002098
- Added to NRHP: October 16, 1979

St. Paul Roman Catholic Church in St. Paul, Oregon, United States, was the first church in Oregon built with brick, constructed in 1846. It is the oldest brick building in the Pacific Northwest. It was listed on the National Register of Historic Places in 1979.

== Background ==
French Prairie, where St. Paul is located, was named after the French Canadian fur trappers who built their cabins in the area. In the 1830s, the French Prairie fur-trappers were raising their families without benefit of a Catholic priest. To remedy the situation, they asked the Bishop of Julopolis at Red River (now Winnipeg, Manitoba, Canada) to send a priest to them. Their first petion has not been found, but their 1836 petition is extant.

Twenty men signed and indicated how many children they had.

- Joseph Jarvay [Gervais], 7 children
- Xaviar Laderout, 1 child
- Eken Luceay, 6 children
- Peare Belleck Bellique, 3 children
- Charles Rondo, 3 children
- Charles Plant, 4 children
- Pear Depo [Depot], 5 children
- Andrey Pecor, 4 children
- Joseph Delar, 5 children
- Luey Fourcy, 3 children
- Lamab Erquet [Arquette], 3 children
- Jean Bt Perrault, 2 children
- joseph Desport, 3 children
- Andrey Longten [Longtain], 4 children
- John Bt Desportes, 2 children
- William Johnson, 2 children
- Charlo Chata, Iroquois Indian
- William McCarty
- Etienne Leferte
- Louis Labonte

== First church ==
The French Canadian pioneers and Indians on the French Prairie in the Willamette Valley built a log cabin chapel along the Willamette River near the Methodist Mission. This structure was later moved to St. Paul and served the community until the current brick structure was built in 1846.

== The priests arrive ==
The Roman Catholic Church sent François Norbert Blanchet and Modeste Demers to the Oregon Country. After receiving permission from the Hudson's Bay Company, Blanchet moved south of the Columbia River and gave the first Mass in the Willamette Valley on January 6, 1839. While preaching to the Catholic community at that church, Blanchet lived behind the altar. On December 11, 1843, Pope Gregory XVI created an apostolic vicarate for Oregon, with Blanchet as archbishop.

== Brick church ==
The log church was replaced by a building made of bricks that were fired on site. Father Blanchet dedicated the new church building on November 1, 1846.

== Church registers ==
The St. Paul Church registers have been transcribed and are available through the St. Paul Mission Historical Society.

The first St. Paul mass was held on January 6, 1839. Subsequent masses were held until February e, 1839 and then from May 13, to June 10, 1839. These sacraments were recorded in the Vancouver register.

Harriet Duncan Munnick and Mikell De Lores Wormell Warner, Catholic Church Records of the Pacific Northwest Vancouver Volumes I and II and Stella Maris Mission (St. Paul, Oregon: French Prairie Press, 1972),

Harriet Duncan Munnick, Catholic Church Records of the Pacific Northwest: St. Paul, Oregon 1839–1898 (Portland, OR: Binford & Mort, 1979)

== See also ==
- St. Paul's Mission, at Kettle Falls, Washington
- List of the oldest churches in the United States
