= Lugenbeel =

Lugenbeel may refer to:

- Lugenbeel County, South Dakota, a former county in South Dakota, United States
- James W. Lugenbeel (1819–1857), American physician
- Pinkney Lugenbeel (1819–1886), United States Army officer
