= Fort Sherman (Idaho) =

Former US Army post in Coeur d'Alene, Idaho

- Fort Sherman Buildings
- U.S. National Register of Historic Places
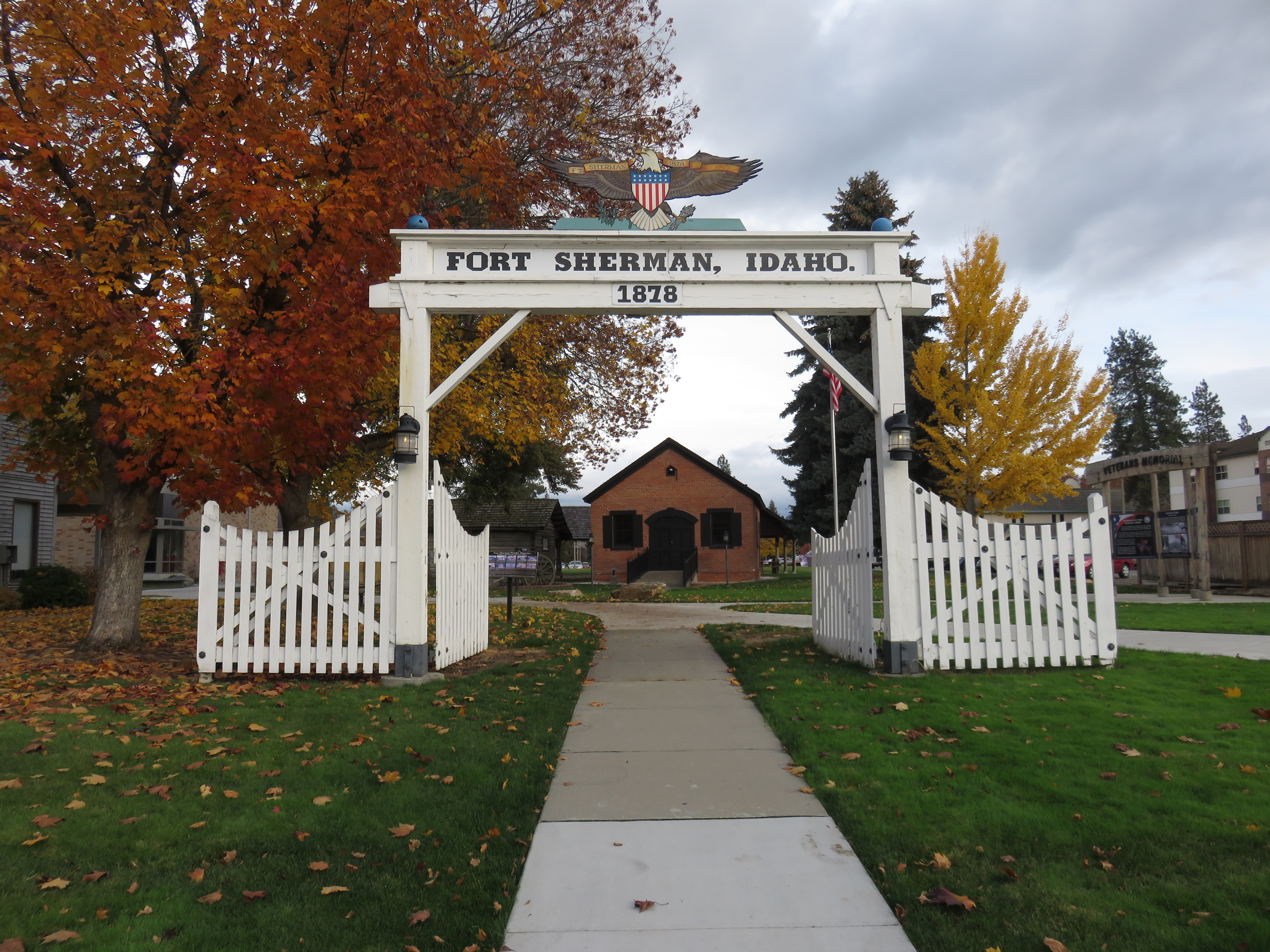
- Historic gate on College Drive in 2018

- Location within the United States Location within Idaho
- Location: Coeur d'Alene, Idaho, U.S.
- Coordinates: 47.678°N 116.798°W
- Built: 1878; 148 years ago
- NRHP reference No.: 79000794
- Added to NRHP: October 25, 1979

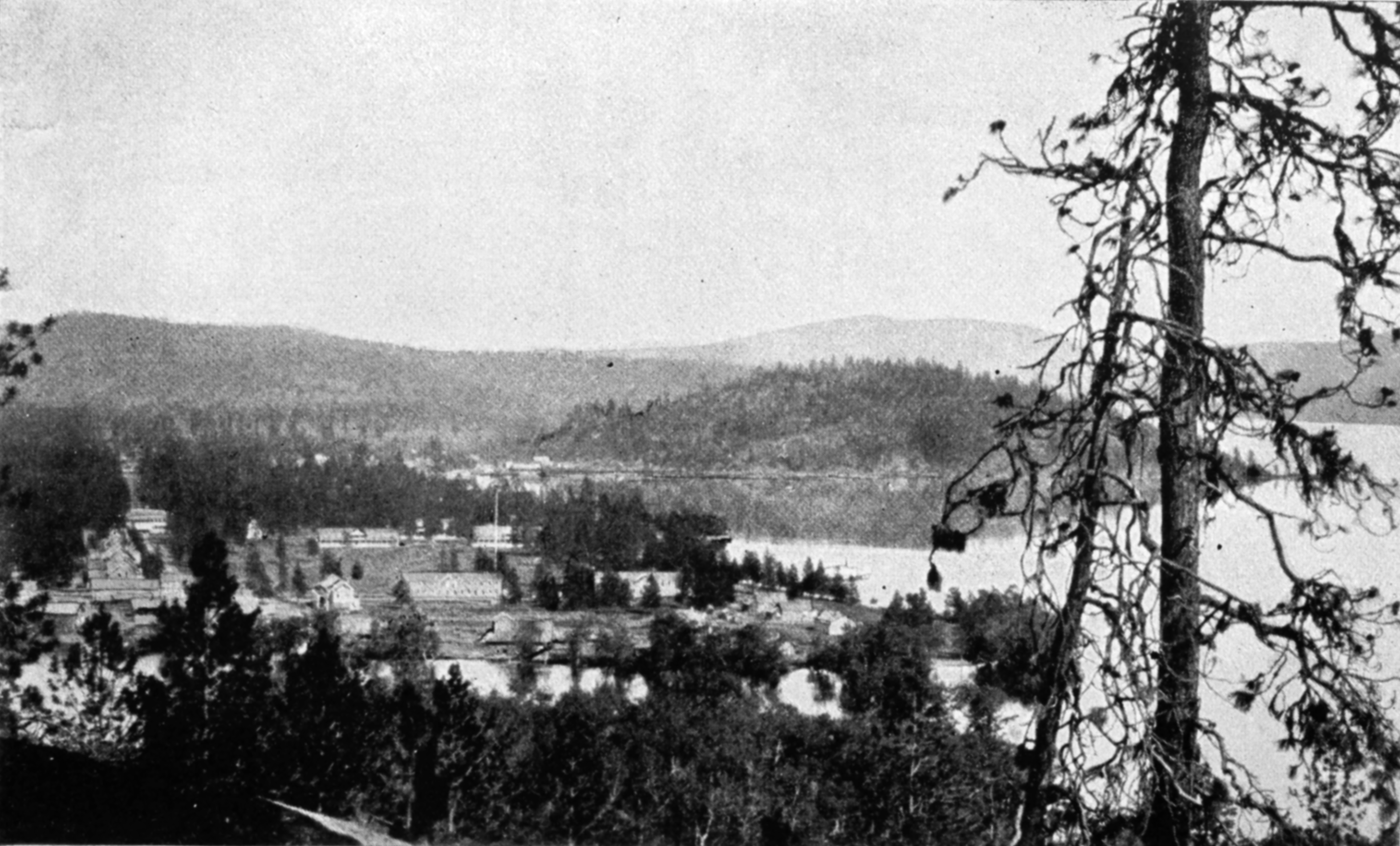
Fort Sherman in 1891

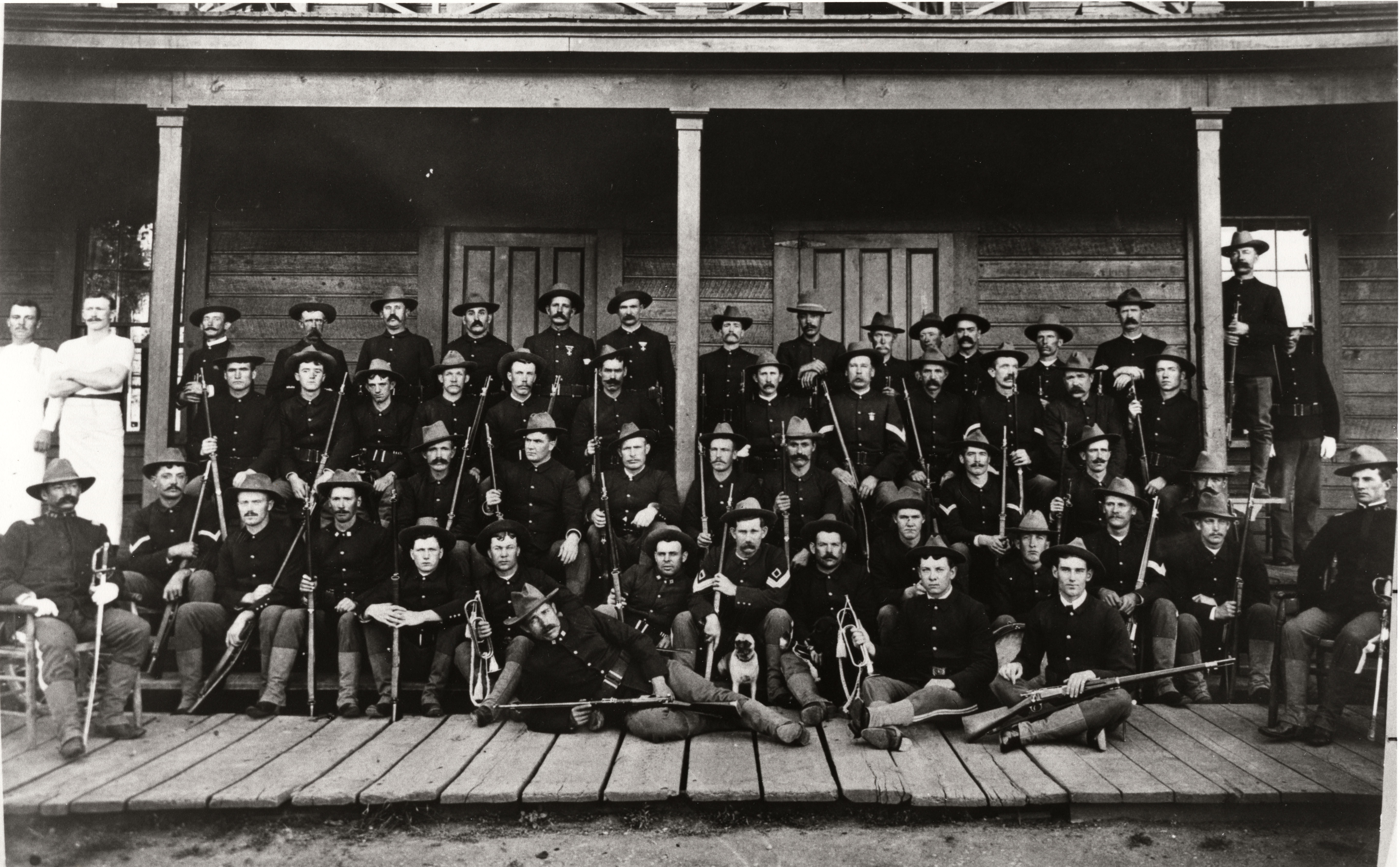
4th Infantry division at Fort Sherman, 1898

Fort Sherman (1878–1900) was a military post in the northwest United States, located in northern Idaho at Coeur d'Alene. General William T. Sherman (1820–91) of the U.S. Army had recommended the site after an inspection tour in 1877.

On the north shore of Lake Coeur d'Alene and the east bank of the outflowing Spokane River, it began as a camp the next year, became Fort Coeur d'Alene in 1879, and the adjacent city grew. Sherman later visited the fort; it was named for him in 1887, three years after his retirement.

The fort became unoccupied during the Spanish–American War (1898) and was abandoned shortly after. The site is now the campus of North Idaho College.

A succeeding Fort Sherman was located in the Panama Canal Zone, operated by the U.S. Army from 1911 to 1999.

== See also ==
- Fort Colville
- Fort Spokane
