= Halverson Canyon =

Canyon in the US state of Washington

- Location within Washington (state)
- Floor elevation: 1,288 ft (393 m)
- Length: est. 3 miles (4.8 km)
- Width: est. 1,000 feet (0.30 km)

Geography
- Location: Lincoln County, WA, United States
- Coordinates: 47°52′01″N 118°29′50″W
- Rivers: Unnamed stream
- Interactive map of Halverson Canyon

The Halverson Canyon is a canyon in the U.S. state of Washington. The canyon is an offshoot of the Columbia River valley. The canyon is named after Halvor Halverson (an immigrant from Norway), who operated a lumber mill in the area.

== Campground ==
There is a boat-in campground at the base of the canyon that is part of the Lake Roosevelt National Recreation Area
