= St. Paul, Oregon =

- City
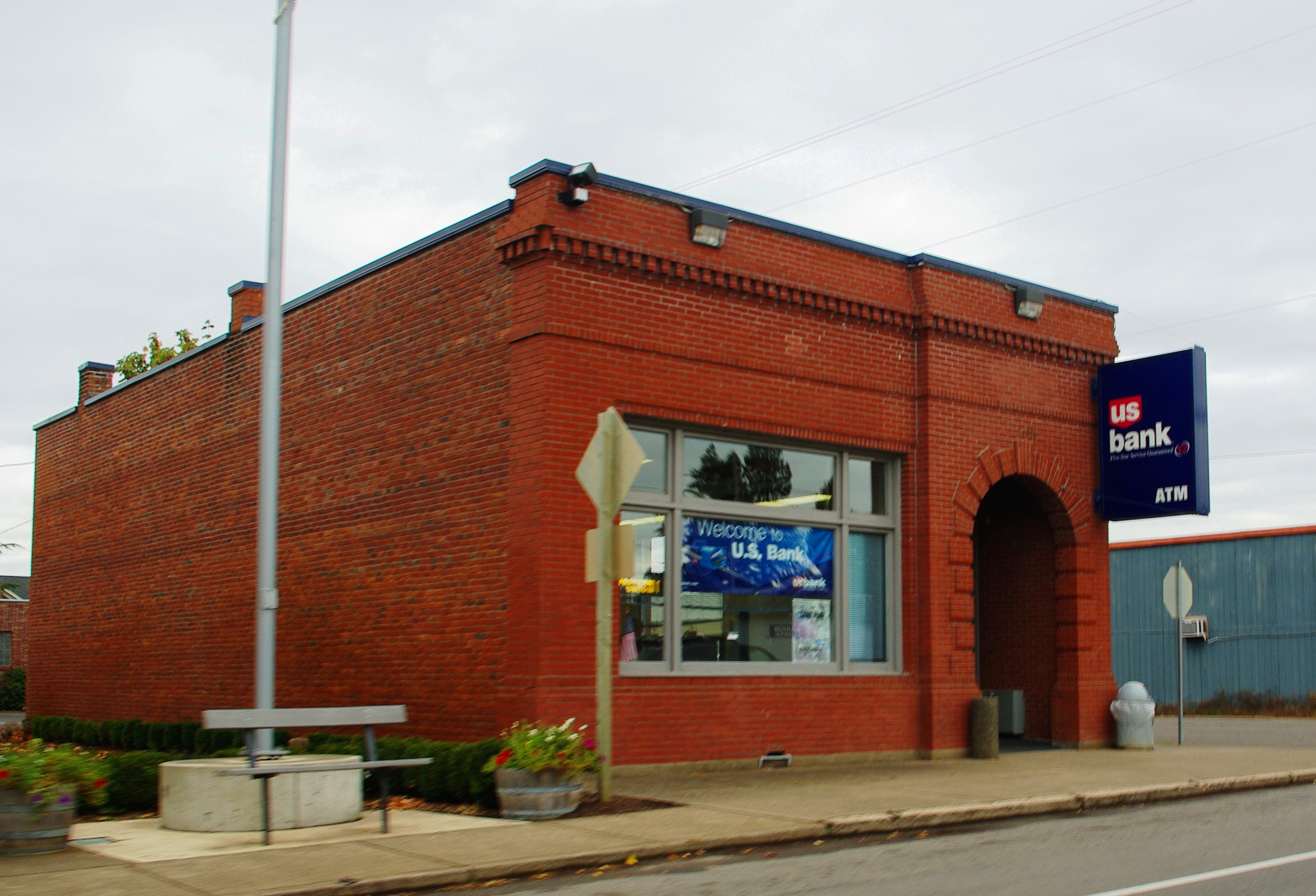
- U.S. Bank branch in St. Paul

- Location in Oregon
- Coordinates: 45°12′44″N 122°58′38″W
- Country: United States
- State: Oregon
- County: Marion
- Incorporated: 1901

Government
  - Mayor: Marty Waldo

Area
  - Total: 0.29 sq mi (0.76 km^{2})
  - Land: 0.29 sq mi (0.76 km^{2})
  - Water: 0 sq mi (0.00 km^{2})
- Elevation: 171 ft (52 m)

Population (2020)
  - Total: 434
  - Density: 1,475.0/sq mi (569.49/km^{2})
- Time zone: UTC-8 (Pacific)
  - Summer (DST): UTC-7 (Pacific)
- ZIP code: 97137
- Area codes: 503 and 971
- FIPS code: 41-64850
- GNIS feature ID: 2411763
- Website: www.cityofstpaul.us

St. Paul or Saint Paul is a city in Marion County, Oregon, United States. It is named after the Saint Paul Mission founded by Archbishop François Norbert Blanchet, who arrived in the Oregon Country in 1838 to minister to the Catholic inhabitants of French Prairie. The population was 434 at the 2020 census. The city is part of the Salem Metropolitan Statistical Area.

== History ==
French Prairie settlers built a log church near this locale in 1836.

St. Paul Pioneer Cemetery, founded in 1839, is the burial location for William Cannon, the only authenticated Revolutionary War veteran buried in Oregon.

St. Paul Roman Catholic Church was built in 1846 and is the oldest brick building in the Pacific Northwest.

St. Paul post office was established in 1874.

The city was incorporated in 1901.

== Geography ==
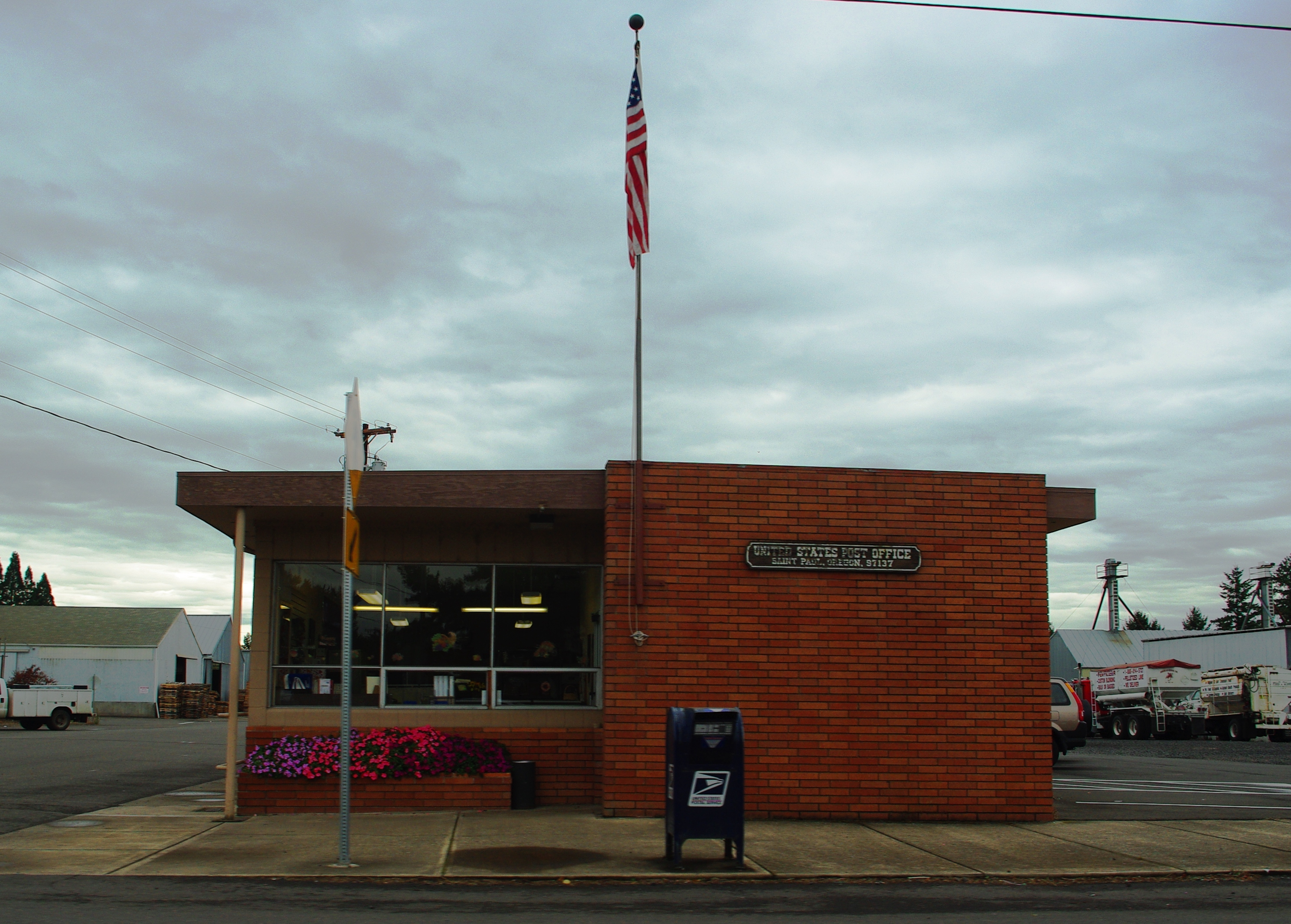
St. Paul's U.S. Post Office

St. Paul is in the northwestern corner of Marion County, along Oregon Route 219, which leads southeast 10 miles (16 km) to Woodburn and north 8 miles (13 km) to Newberg. Salem, the state capital and the Marion county seat, is 21 miles (34 km) to the south, and downtown Portland is 29 miles (47 km) to the northeast.

According to the U.S. Census Bureau, St. Paul has a total area of 0.29 square miles (0.75 km^{2}), all land. Mission Creek forms the southeastern border of the city. It is a northeast-flowing tributary of Champoeg Creek, which flows into the Willamette River.

== Demographics ==
Historical population
Census	Pop.	Note	%±
1910	103		—
1920	160		55.3%
1930	148		−7.5%
1940	183		23.6%
1950	226		23.5%
1960	254		12.4%
1970	347		36.6%
1980	312		−10.1%
1990	322		3.2%
2000	354		9.9%
2010	421		18.9%
2020	434		3.1%
U.S. Decennial Census

=== 2020 census ===
As of the 2020 census, St. Paul had a population of 434. The median age was 39.3 years. 24.7% of residents were under the age of 18 and 18.0% of residents were 65 years of age or older. For every 100 females there were 100.0 males, and for every 100 females age 18 and over there were 99.4 males age 18 and over.

0% of residents lived in urban areas, while 100.0% lived in rural areas.

There were 153 households in St. Paul, of which 45.8% had children under the age of 18 living in them. Of all households, 61.4% were married-couple households, 15.7% were households with a male householder and no spouse or partner present, and 14.4% were households with a female householder and no spouse or partner present. About 15.1% of all households were made up of individuals and 6.5% had someone living alone who was 65 years of age or older.

There were 157 housing units, of which 2.5% were vacant. Among occupied housing units, 82.4% were owner-occupied and 17.6% were renter-occupied. The homeowner vacancy rate was <0.1% and the rental vacancy rate was <0.1%.

Racial composition as of the 2020 census
Race	Number	Percent
White	353	81.3%
Black or African American	0	0%
American Indian and Alaska Native	0	0%
Asian	2	0.5%
Native Hawaiian and Other Pacific Islander	0	0%
Some other race	53	12.2%
Two or more races	26	6.0%
Hispanic or Latino (of any race)	85	19.6%

=== 2010 census ===
As of the census of 2010, there were 421 people, 147 households, and 113 families residing in the city. The population density was 1,451.7 inhabitants per square mile (560.5/km^{2}). There were 151 housing units at an average density of 520.7 per square mile (201.0/km^{2}). The racial makeup of the city was 94.1% White, 0.5% Native American, 4.8% from other races, and 0.7% from two or more races. Hispanic or Latino of any race were 14.7% of the population.

There were 147 households, of which 43.5% had children under the age of 18 living with them, 66.0% were married couples living together, 6.1% had a female householder with no husband present, 4.8% had a male householder with no wife present, and 23.1% were non-families. 20.4% of all households were made up of individuals, and 9.5% had someone living alone who was 65 years of age or older. The average household size was 2.86 and the average family size was 3.28.

The median age in the city was 38 years. 30.9% of residents were under the age of 18; 4.9% were between the ages of 18 and 24; 26.5% were from 25 to 44; 25.7% were from 45 to 64; and 12.4% were 65 years of age or older. The gender makeup of the city was 49.2% male and 50.8% female.

=== 2000 census ===
As of the census of 2000, there were 354 people, 123 households, and 90 families residing in the city. The population density was 1,231.4 inhabitants per square mile (475.4/km^{2}). There were 128 housing units at an average density of 445.2 per square mile (171.9/km^{2}). The racial makeup of the city was 78.25% White, 0.28% African American, 0.56% Native American, 0.28% Asian, 18.08% from other races, and 2.54% from two or more races. Hispanic or Latino of any race were 25.71% of the population.

There were 123 households, out of which 34.1% had children under the age of 18 living with them, 54.5% were married couples living together, 8.9% had a female householder with no husband present, and 26.8% were non-families. 19.5% of all households were made up of individuals, and 10.6% had someone living alone who was 65 years of age or older. The average household size was 2.88 and the average family size was 3.34.

In the city, the population was spread out, with 30.5% under the age of 18, 7.9% from 18 to 24, 25.4% from 25 to 44, 22.0% from 45 to 64, and 14.1% who were 65 years of age or older. The median age was 33 years. For every 100 females, there were 110.7 males. For every 100 females age 18 and over, there were 106.7 males.

The median income for a household in the city was $43,750, and the median income for a family was $55,000. Males had a median income of $39,583 versus $25,357 for females. The per capita income for the city was $19,144. About 3.8% of families and 11.3% of the population were below the poverty line, including 8.0% of those under age 18 and none of those age 65 or over.

== Arts and culture ==
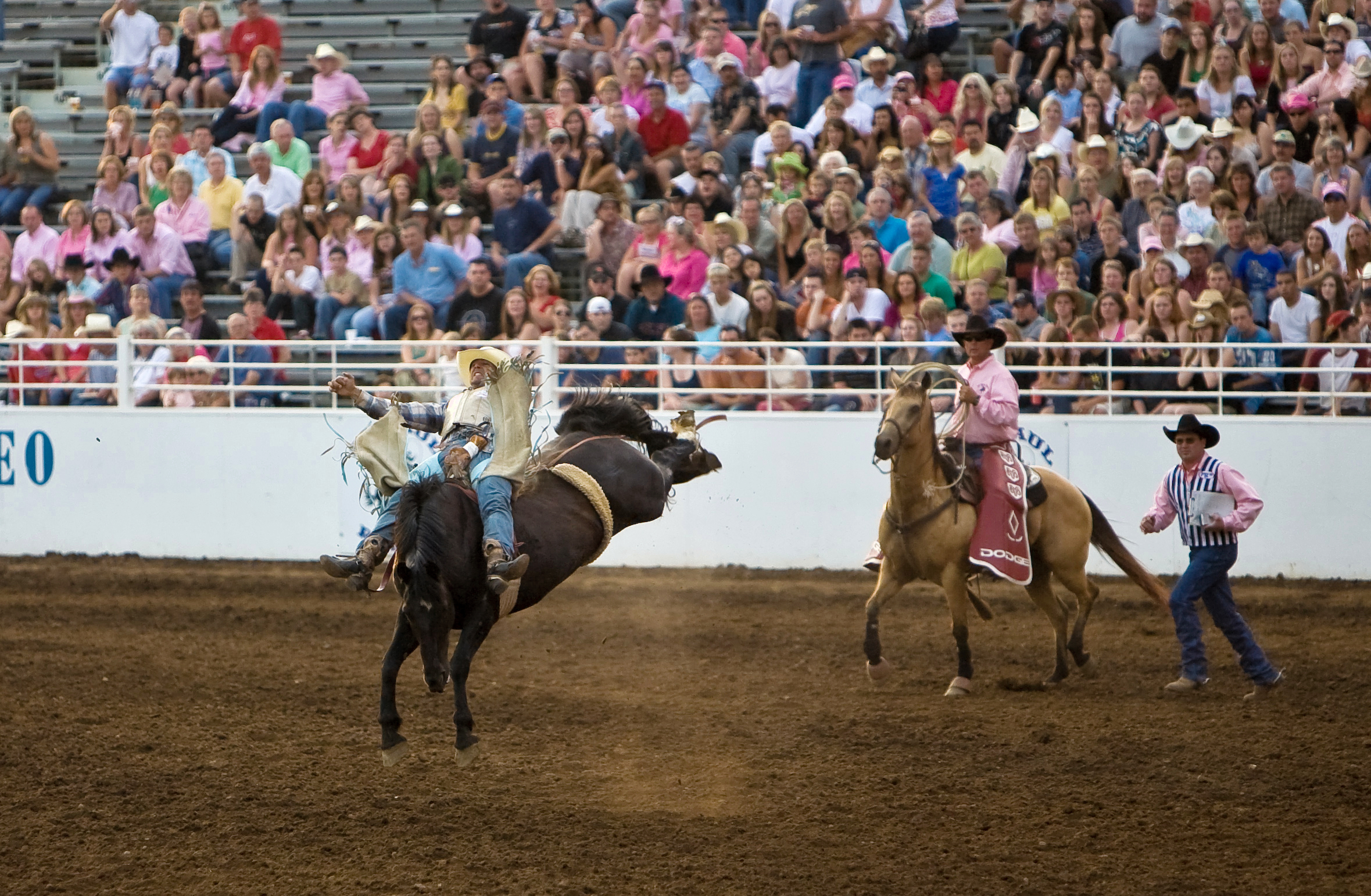
Bronco rider at the St. Paul Rodeo

=== Annual cultural events ===
The St. Paul Rodeo has been held every 4th of July since 1935. It is one of the 20 largest rodeos in the U.S. and was voted by the Professional Rodeo Cowboys Association as the finest rodeo in the Pacific Northwest in 1991.

In July 2023, the St. Paul Rodeo was inducted into the Pro Rodeo Hall of Fame..

=== Museums and other points of interest ===
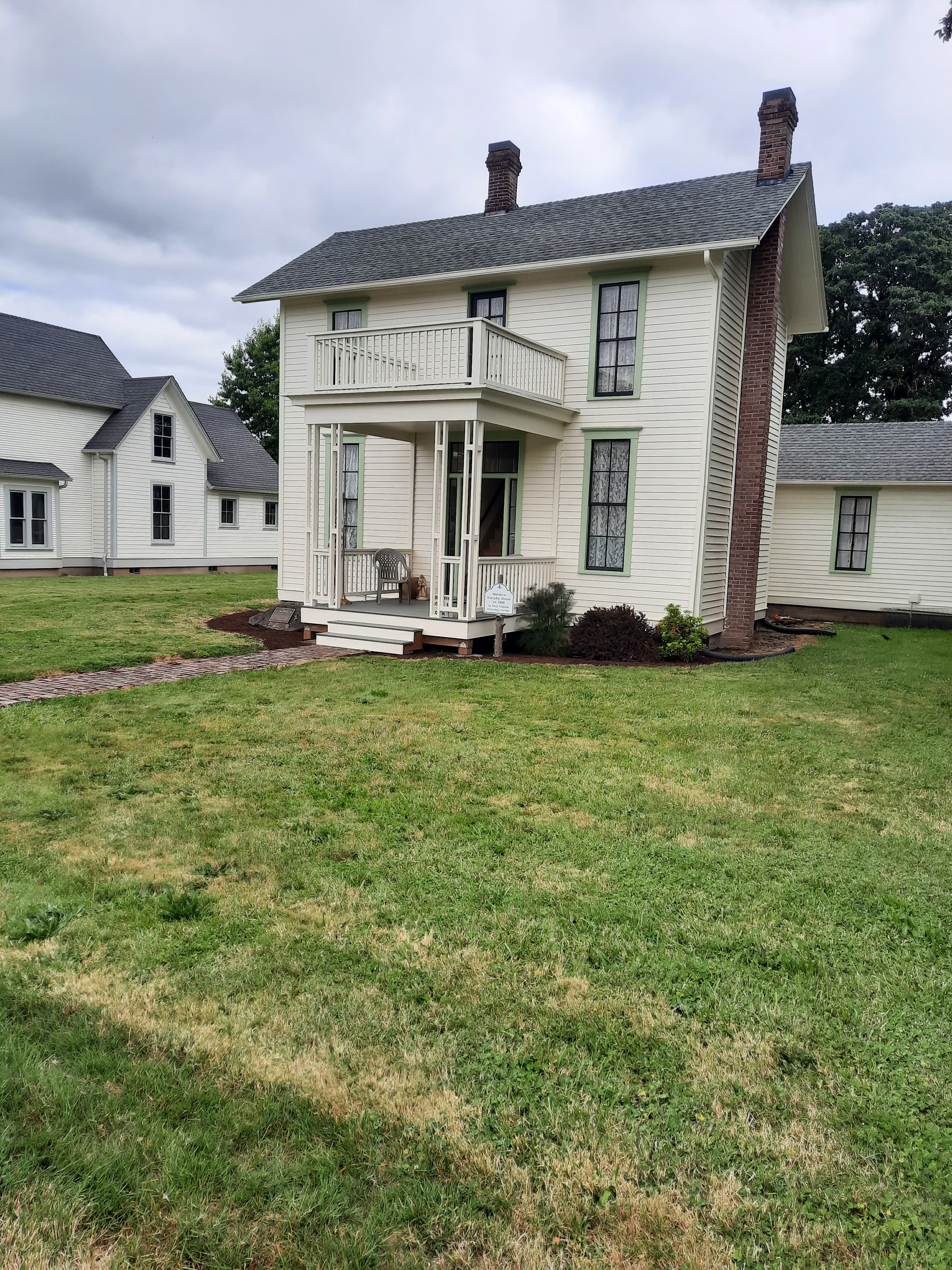
Brentano House on the left. Murphy House on the right.

The center of St. Paul was listed on the National Register of Historic Places (NRHP) in 1982 as the St. Paul Historic District. The district includes 63 contributing properties, with St. Paul Catholic Church, which is also individually listed on the NRHP, as the centerpiece.

The St. Paul Mission Historical Society owns two historic houses that are open at the October annual meeting and on request.

== Education ==
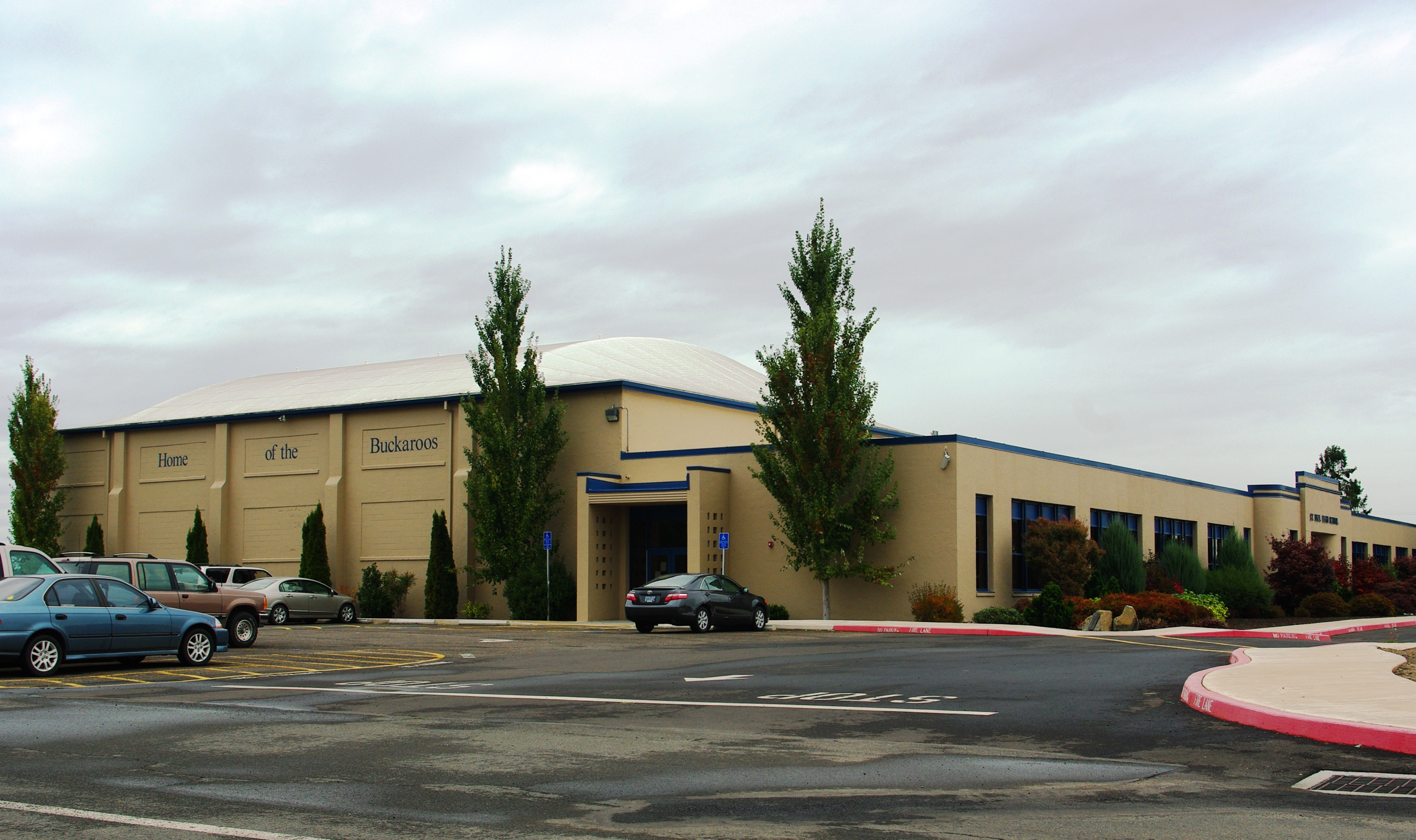
St. Paul High School

Public education in St. Paul is provided by the two-school St. Paul School District. St. Paul Elementary School serves grades Pre-K through 6, and St. Paul Middle & High School serves grades 7 through 12. St. Paul Parochial School, a private Pre-K through eighth grade parish school, was founded in 1844 by six Sisters of Notre Dame de Namur as Sainte Marie de Willamette. The sisters ran the school until 1853. In 1861, the Sisters of the Holy Names of Jesus and Mary took over the school and ran it through the 1980s. From 1993 through 2000, the school was served by the Sisters of St. Mary of Oregon.

== Transportation ==
Oregon Route 219 passes through St. Paul.

== Notable people ==
- Herman Pillette (1895–1960), baseball player
