= St. Paul's Mission =

Coordinates: 48°37′35″N 118°06′26″W

- U.S. National Register of Historic Places
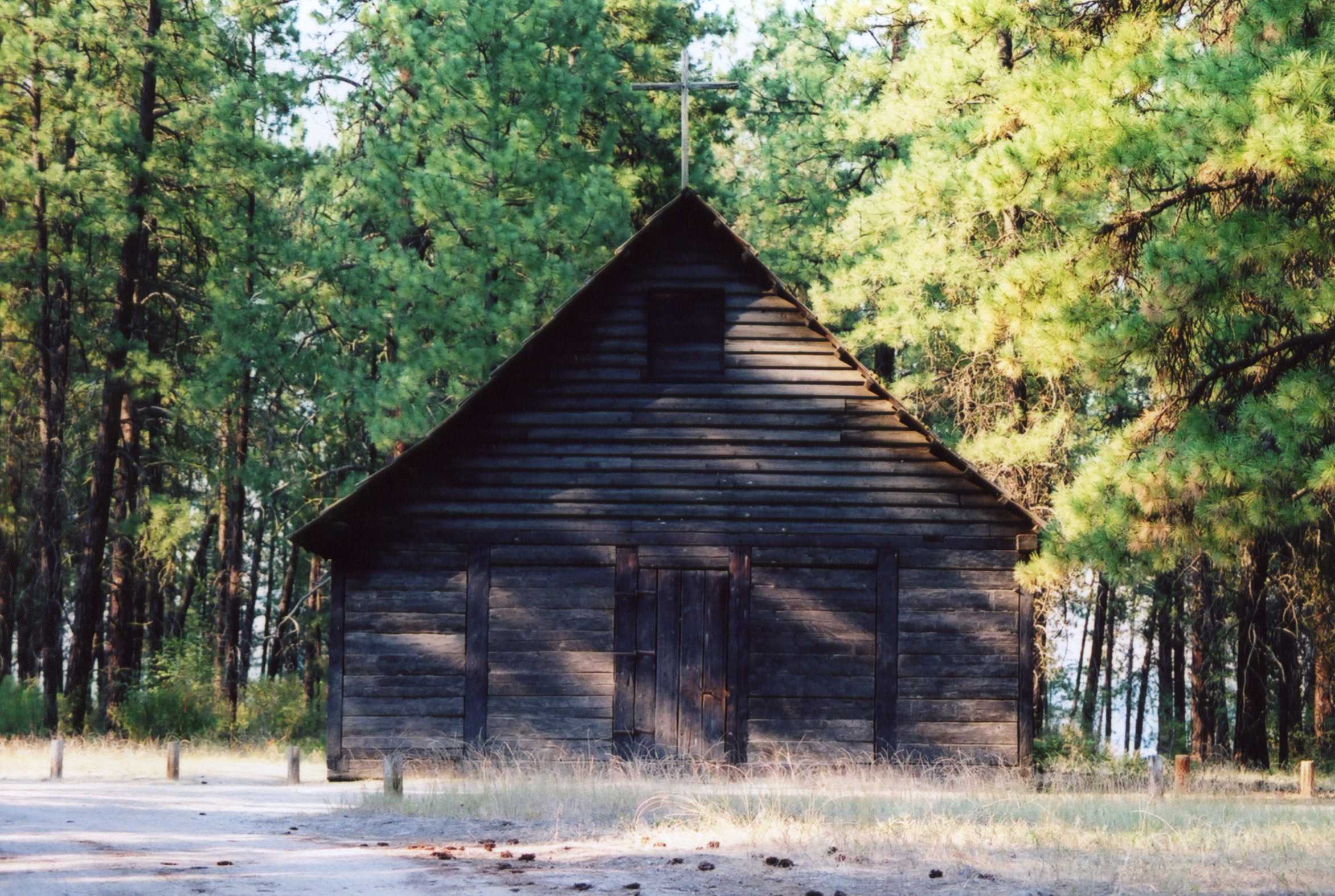
- St Paul's Mission, August 2006
- Location: On Lake Roosevelt, west of Kettle Falls
- Nearest city: Kettle Falls, Washington
- NRHP reference No.: 74002259
- Added to NRHP: November 20, 1974

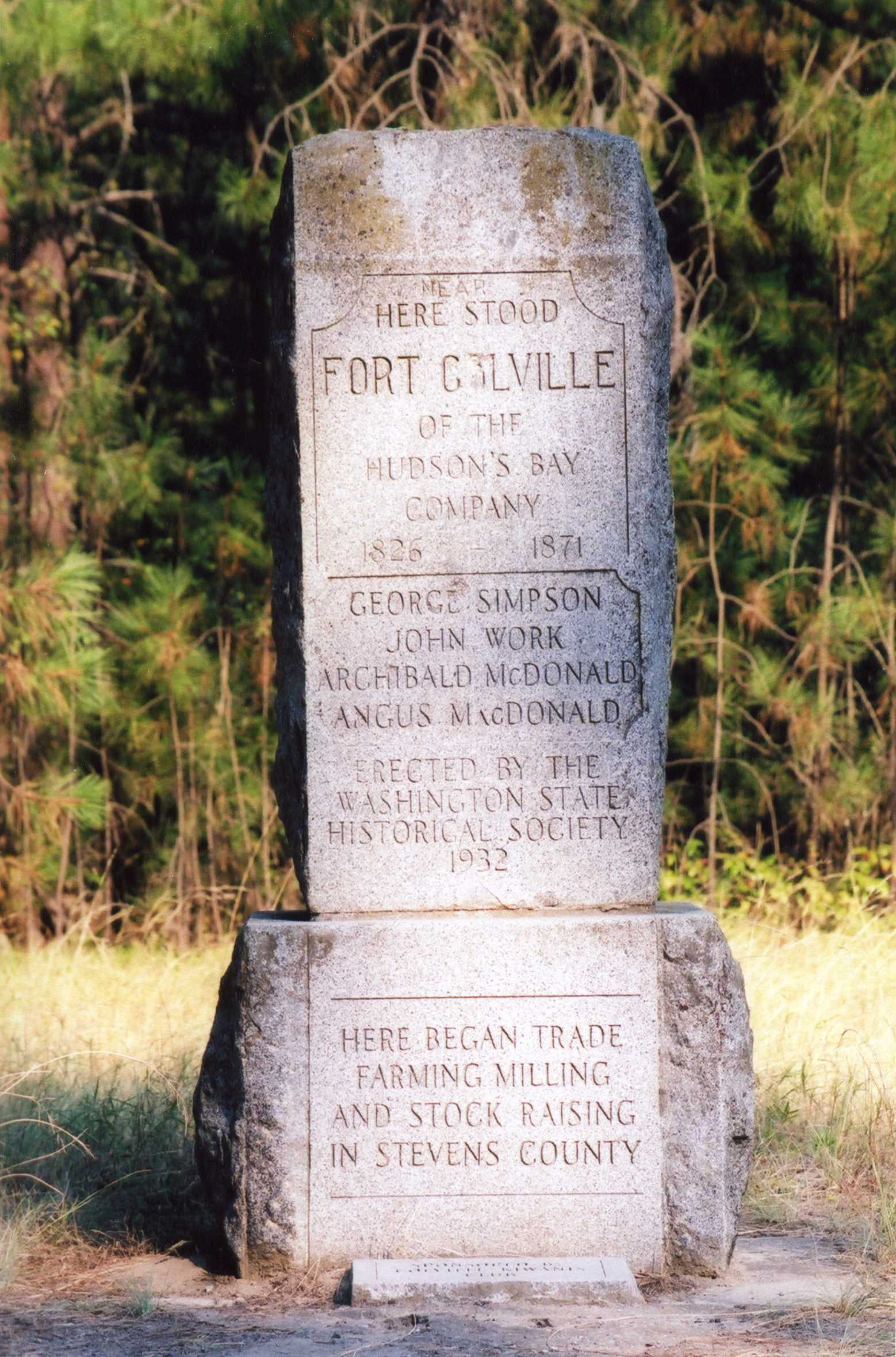
Marker with description of mission

St. Paul's Mission was a Jesuit mission church established in the Hudson's Bay Company's (HBC) Columbia District, in the Pacific Northwest region of North America, in the 1830s. The mission was built near the HBC's Fort Colville, on the bluff then overlooking Kettle Falls on the Columbia River. The building still stands today.

== History ==
Both Catholic and Protestant missionaries visited Kettle Falls several times from 1836 on, attempting to convert natives to Christianity.

The first missionaries, representatives of the American Board of Commissioners for Foreign Missions and sponsored by the Presbyterians and Congregationalists, arrived in 1836. They were unable to baptize any Indians.

Catholic missionaries, led by French-Canadian Fathers François Norbert Blanchet and Modeste Demers, arrived in 1838. They delivered the first Catholic mass between the Rocky Mountains and the Cascade Range in 1839 and baptized 19 Indians, but were unable to establish a permanent mission. Their efforts were more focused on St. Paul Roman Catholic Church, in the Willamette Valley.

Following Belgian Father DeSmet's preaching to the Sxoielpi (Colville Indians) in August 1845, a small log chapel was built. Two years later the present hand-hewn log church replaced it. Sometime around 1869, St. Paul's Mission was abandoned in favor of a location seven miles north of the present city of Colville. Damaged by fire in 1910, the present structure was restored in 1939–40.
