= Lake Roosevelt National Recreation Area =

National recreation area in the U.S. state of Washington

Lake Roosevelt
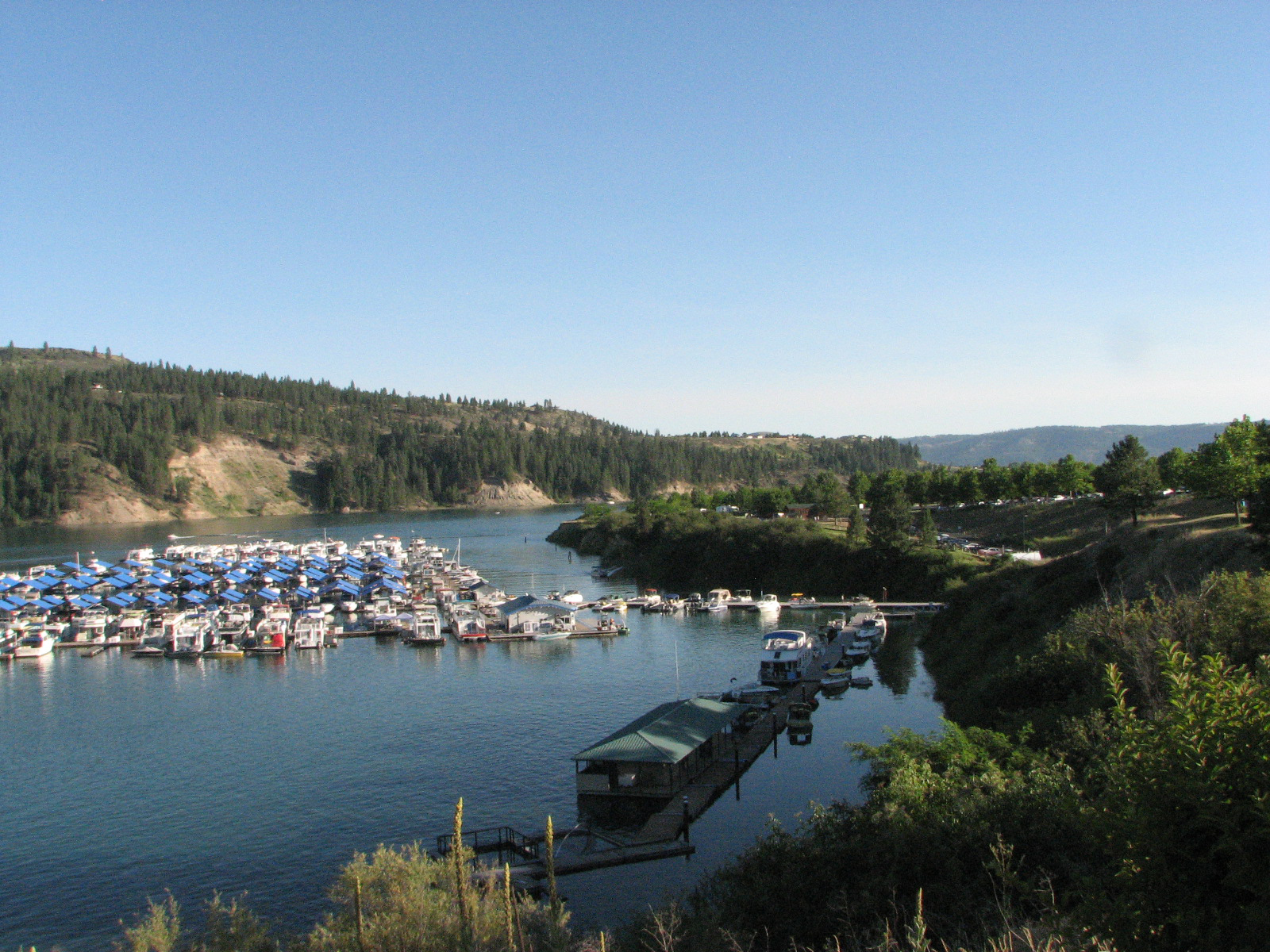
- View from Two Rivers Marina

- Location within Washington (state) Location within the United States
- Location: Ferry, Stevens, Lincoln, and Grant counties, Washington, USA
- Nearest city: Spokane, Washington
- Coordinates: 48°06′27″N 118°12′46″W
- Area: 100,390 acres (406.3 km^{2})
- Established: April 1946
- Visitors: 1,183,757 (in 2025)
- Governing body: National Park Service, U.S. Bureau of Reclamation, U.S. Bureau of Indian Affairs, Confederated Tribes of the Colville Reservation, Spokane Tribe
- Website: Lake Roosevelt National Recreation Area

Lake Roosevelt National Recreation Area is a U.S. national recreation area that encompasses the 130-mile (210 km) long Franklin D. Roosevelt Lake between Grand Coulee Dam and Northport, Washington, in eastern Washington state. The Grand Coulee Dam was built on the Columbia River in 1941 as part of the Columbia River Basin project. Lake Roosevelt National Recreation Area is a unit of the National Park Service and provides opportunities for fishing, swimming, canoeing, boating, hunting, camping, and visiting historic Fort Spokane and St. Paul's Mission. Crescent Bay Lake in Grant County just southwest of Lake Roosevelt also falls under the jurisdiction of the National Recreation Area.

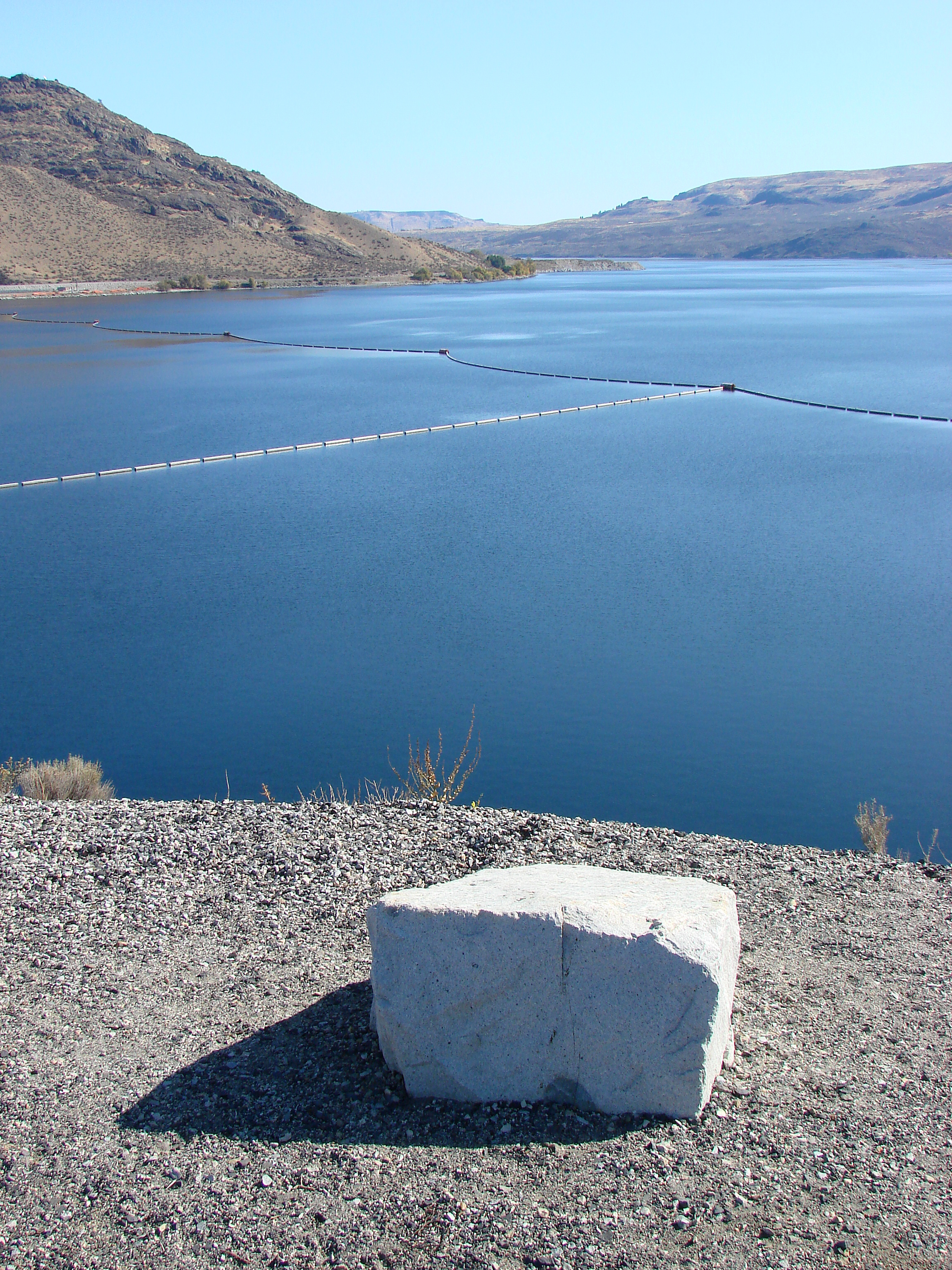
Lake Roosevelt atop Coulee Dam

It was established in 1946 as the Coulee Dam Recreational Area and was created by a memorandum of agreement with the Spokane Tribe, Colville Indian Reservation, and United States Bureau of Reclamation. It has, uniquely with Curecanti National Recreation Area, never been established by Congress or the president. The recreation area was renamed for President Franklin D. Roosevelt in 1996, over objections from the Colville Tribe.

== History ==
- St. Paul's Mission was a Jesuit mission church established in the Hudson's Bay Company (HBC) in the 1830s. The mission was built near the HBC's Fort Colville, on the bluff then overlooking Kettle Falls on the Columbia River.
- Fort Spokane was a U.S. Army frontier outpost in Lincoln County, Washington. Located at the confluence of the Columbia and Spokane rivers, it separated the Colville and Spokane tribes from Spokane. The fort was closed in 1929.
- Confederated Tribes of the Colville Reservation is in north central Washington
- Spokane Tribe of Indians is in northeastern Washington, centered at Wellpinit. The reservation is located almost entirely in Stevens County, but also includes two small parcels of land (totaling about 1.52 acres [0.62 ha]) in Lincoln County, including part of the Spokane River.

== Things to Do ==
- Boating, Canoe & Kayak – 22 public boat launches, plus 4 available to non-members on the Colville Reservation, by permit.
- Camping – 3 Standard campgrounds, 9 Boat-in campgrounds
- Fishing
- Swimming
