= Fort Spokane =

Former US Army post in Lincoln County, Washington

- U.S. National Register of Historic Places
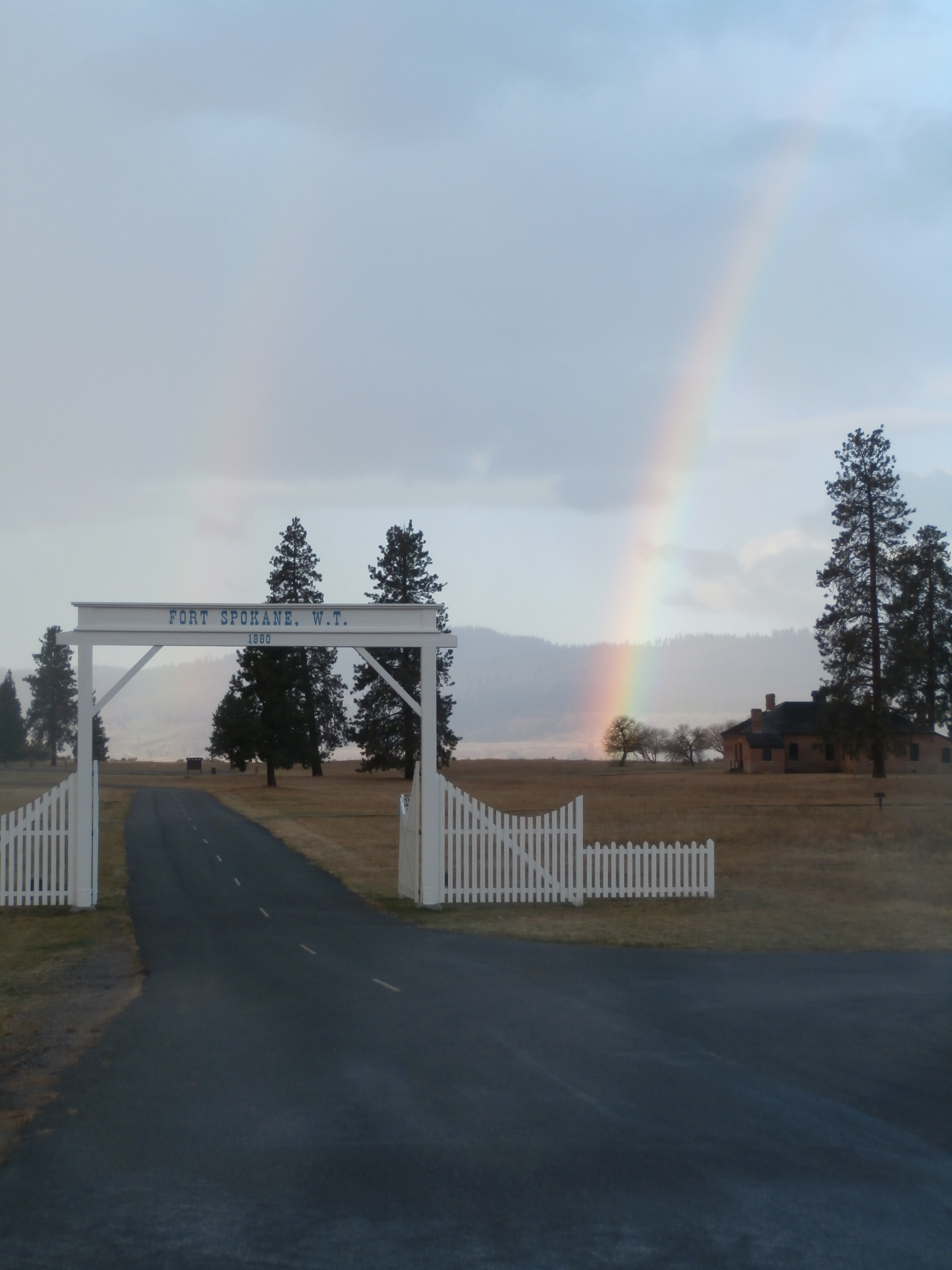
- Fort Spokane entrance in 2012

- Location within the United States Location within Washington (state)
- Location: Lincoln County, Washington
- Nearest city: Deer Meadows, Washington
- Coordinates: 47°54′47″N 118°18′22″W
- Built: 1880; 146 years ago
- NRHP reference No.: 88002621
- Added to NRHP: November 23, 1988

Fort Spokane was a frontier outpost in the northwest United States, located in Lincoln County, Washington, approximately fifty miles (80 km) west-northwest of Spokane. At the confluence of the Columbia and Spokane rivers, the U.S. Army post was used to separate the Colville and Spokane tribes on their reservations from the newly established city of Spokane. The fort was last used in 1929 and was later incorporated into the Lake Roosevelt National Recreation Area and is listed on the National Register of Historic Places.

== History ==
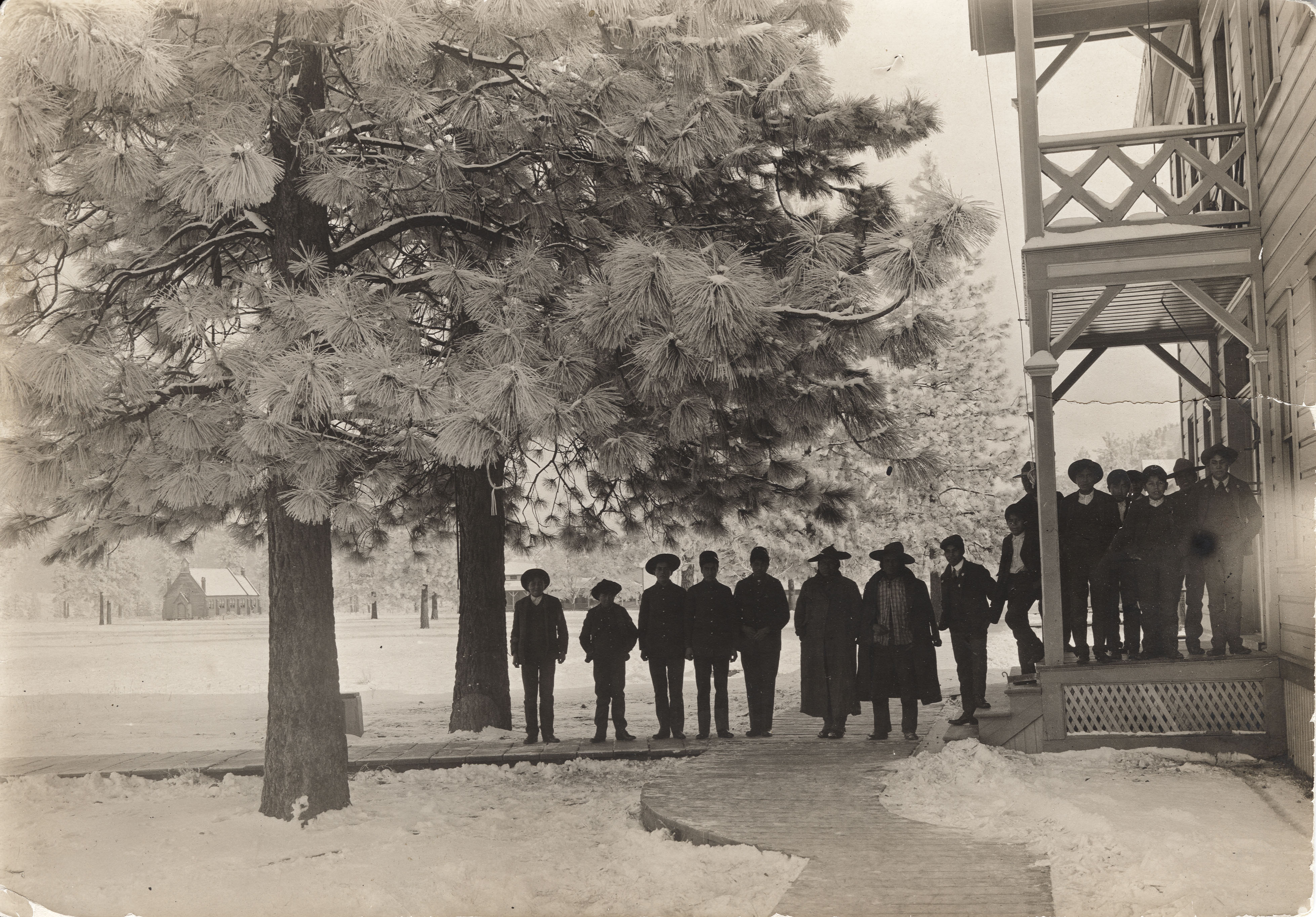
Fort Spokane School outside the Administration Building

=== Background ===
The U.S. Army stationed troops at White Bluffs on the Columbia River, at Foster Creek on the Okanogan River, and at Spokane Falls to manage potential unrest amongst the Colville, Spokane, and Palouse peoples. The troops at White Bluffs and Foster Creek were moved to a post south of Lake Chelan in 1878, closer to Chief Moses. Difficult to supply, Camp Chelan was abandoned and the troops moved to a new site, Camp Spokane. After the Colville Reservation was established in 1872, and the Spokane Reservation in 1881, the US Army assumed policing responsibilities until 1890.

=== Use as an outpost ===
Fort Spokane was founded in the fall of 1880 by Lt. Colonel Henry C. Merriam and Second Infantry Regiment as Camp Spokane. It was renamed Fort Spokane in 1882. The Fourth Infantry Regiment took over in 1886, and the Sixteenth Infantry Regiment in 1896.

Fort Spokane was strategically located at the convergence of the Columbia River and the Spokane River about fifty miles (80 km) west-northwest of the city of Spokane, it was the last army frontier post established in the Northwest. In 1884, there were about 25 buildings, including six barracks, a schoolroom, an ice house and a two-story administrative building topped with a glass-sided cupola. Eventually there were about 50 buildings built on the post which included officers' quarters, enlisted men's barracks, a hospital, chapel, post headquarters, morgue, quartermaster warehouses, shops, stables, and post trader store. The post served to consolidate older posts like Fort Colville closer to the population areas, and as a buffer between the Indian reservations and settlers in the area. When the Spanish–American War broke out in 1898 the troops at Fort Spokane were moved elsewhere and the fort was turned over to the Colville Indian Agency. In 1899, the post became a boarding school for Indian children until 1914, when the post became a tuberculosis sanatorium for the next 15 years. The site was abandoned by the government in 1929.

=== Preservation and restoration ===
The National Park Service took over the site in 1960 with only four original buildings remaining from the fort. Four buildings and the site have been preserved and are now part of the Park Service's Lake Roosevelt National Recreation Area. The restoration has saved the 1884 stable, the 1888 powder magazine, the 1889 reservoir and the 1892 guard house.

== See also ==
- National Register of Historic Places listings in Lincoln County, Washington
- Miles, Washington - Post office address for the fort.
- Fort Colville
- Fort Sherman (Idaho)
