= Herman Pillette =

American baseball player (1895–1960)

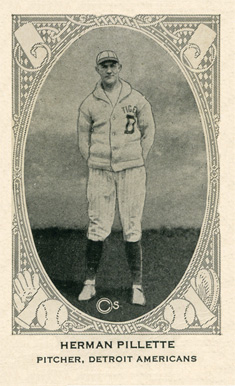
- Pitcher
- Born: December 26, 1895; St. Paul, Oregon, U.S.
- Died: April 30, 1960 (aged 64); Sacramento, California, U.S.
- Batted: Right Threw: Right

MLB debut
- July 30, 1917, for the Cincinnati Reds

Last MLB appearance
- September 28, 1924, for the Detroit Tigers

MLB statistics
- Win–loss record: 34–32
- Earned run average: 3.45
- Strikeouts: 148
- Stats at Baseball Reference

Teams
- Cincinnati Reds (1917); Detroit Tigers (1922–1924)

Herman Polycarp Pillette (December 26, 1895 – April 30, 1960), nicknamed "Old Folks" in the later part of his career, was an American right-handed professional baseball pitcher, who played in 29 seasons (1917–1945). During his playing days, Pillette was listed as 6 ft 2 in (1.88 m) tall, weighing 190 pounds (86 kg), while batting and throwing right-handed.

Pillette played in Major League Baseball (MLB) for the Cincinnati Reds (one inning in 1917) and Detroit Tigers (1922–1924). In 1922, he compiled a 19–12 win–loss record and ranked second in the American League (AL) with a 2.85 earned run average (ERA) and four shutouts, while placing seventh in the AL in wins. Pillette never achieved the same level of success again and concluded his major league career with a 34–32 record and a 3.45 ERA in 107 games.

Pillette also played 23 years in the Pacific Coast League (PCL) from 1920 to 1921 and 1925 to 1945. He set PCL records with 708 games pitched, 23 PCL seasons as a pitcher, and seven PCL teams as a pitcher; Pillette was one of the inaugural inductees into the Pacific Coast League Hall of Fame, in 1943. Across all levels of minor and major league play for which records are available, he pitched in 789 games and compiled a 298–296 record.

== Early years ==
Pillette was born in St. Paul, Oregon, in 1895. He dropped out of school at a young age to work on his father's farm and began playing semipro baseball in Newberg and Woodburn, Oregon.

== Professional baseball ==
=== Minor leagues and Cincinnati ===
Pillette began his professional baseball career in 1917, playing for the Tacoma Tigers and the Richmond Quakers. He also pitched one inning for the Cincinnati Reds, on July 30, 1917, giving up four hits and two earned runs. Pillette did not appear in another major league game until five years later.

Pillette continued in the minor leagues with the Tacoma Tigers in 1918, the Des Moines Boosters in 1919, and the Regina Senators in 1920. He also played for the Standifer Steel Shipyard team in 1918. He began a long association with the PCL in 1920 with the Portland Beavers. Pillette compiled a rare feat, losing 30 games, with Portland in 1921.

=== Detroit Tigers ===
In December 1921, the Detroit Tigers purchased Pillette from Portland. The Tigers paid $40,000 and players for Pillette and one other player. In his rookie season of 1922, Pillette compiled a 19–12 record, and had a 2.85 ERA — a full point below the league average ERA of 3.87 in 1922. Pillette's performance in 1922 ranked him second in the American League in ERA (2.85), sixth in winning percentage (.613), seventh in wins (19), second in shutouts (4), second in hit batsmen (15), fourth in games started (37), and ninth in innings pitched (274 2/3) and batters faced (1,183). One of Pillette's losses in 1922 came in a perfect game pitched by Charlie Robertson on April 30, 1922. Pillette took the 2–0 loss.

After a strong rookie season, Pillette never reached the same level of performance. In 1923, his ERA rose by a full run to 3.85 — up from 2.85 the prior year. And, instead of being among the win leaders, Pillette led the American League with 19 losses. Pillette saw limited action in 1924, starting only three games and finishing 1–1. He played in his final major league game on September 28, 1924.

=== Pacific Coast League ===
Although his major league career ended in 1924, Pillette pitched for another 21 years in the PCL with the Portland Beavers (1925), Mission Reds (1926–1933), Seattle Indians (1933–1935), Hollywood Stars (1935), San Diego Padres (1936–1942), and Sacramento Solons (1943–1945). He pitched a no-hitter for the Mission Reds on October 5, 1929, and won a PCL championship in 1937 with San Diego. Pillette was three months shy of his 50th birthday when he appeared in his final PCL game in September 1945.

In all, Pillette played 23 seasons in the PCL, compiling a 226–235 record and 3.74 ERA in PCL play. He was selected in 1943 as one of the inaugural inductees in the Pacific Coast League Hall of Fame. He set PCL records with 708 games worked by a pitcher, 23 PCL seasons as a pitcher, and seven PCL teams as a pitcher.

Across all levels of minor and major league play for which records are available, Pillette pitched in 789 games and compiled a 298–296 record.

== Family and later years ==
Pillette's son Duane Pillette was a major league pitcher, from 1949 to 1956.

On April 30, 1960, Pillette died in Sacramento, California, at age 64 in 1960. He was buried at St. Mary Catholic Cemetery in Sacramento.
