= Pinkney City, Washington =

Ghost town in Washington (state)

- Ghost town
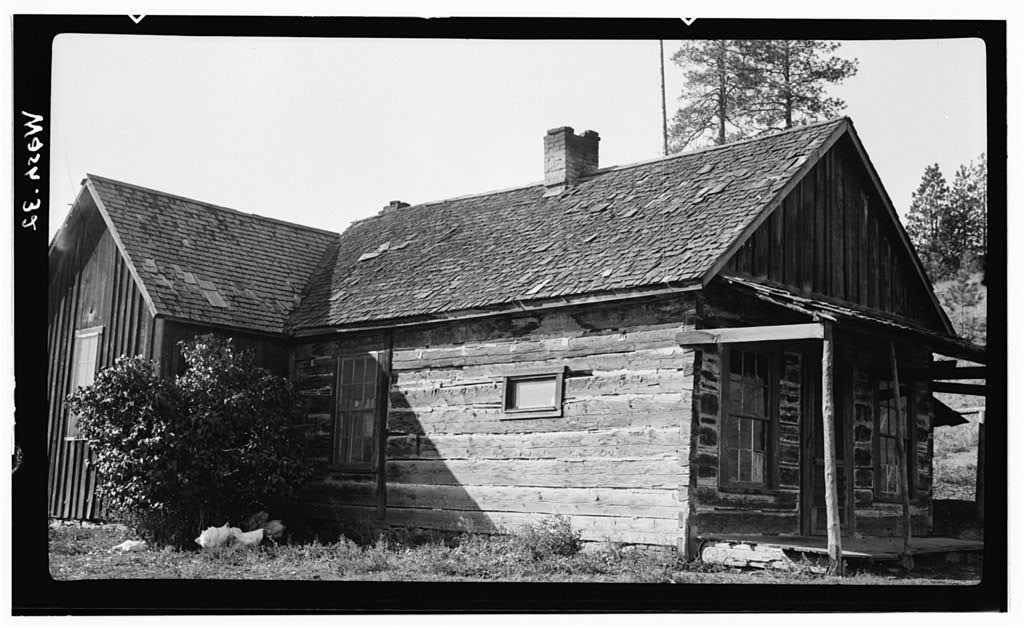
- The John Holst homestead near Colville

- Location within Washington (state) Location within the United States
- Coordinates: 48°34′35″N 117°52′41″W
- Country: United States
- State: Washington
- County: Stevens
- Time zone: UTC-8 (Pacific (PST))
  - Summer (DST): UTC-7 (PDT)

Pinkney City (also called Pinkneyville) was a small community outside of Fort Colville (US Army) in what is now Stevens County, Washington. Originally named for Brevet Major Pinkney Lugenbeel, first commander and builder of the fort in 1859. The town grew up around the fort shortly after.

The civilian town just north of the U.S. Army post soon became an important trading center and, in 1860, the county seat for the original Spokane County. In 1863, original Spokane County Board of County Commissioners petitioned the legislature to make Stevens County, which had not yet organized, part of Spokane County. Instead in 1864, the Washington Territorial Legislature dissolved Spokane County and made it part of Stevens County with the original Spokane County Commissioners and the county seat at Pinkney City retained. The first post office for the town was established December 17, 1859 and discontinued April 17, 1860. The next post office was established November 25, 1862 and called Fort Colville. Its name was changed to Colville on April 13, 1883. After the fort was abandoned in 1882, Pinkney City began to disappear with most businesses moving three miles to the current town of Colville, Washington.

== See also ==
- Colville, Washington
- List of ghost towns in Washington
