= Mission Creek (Marion County, Oregon) =

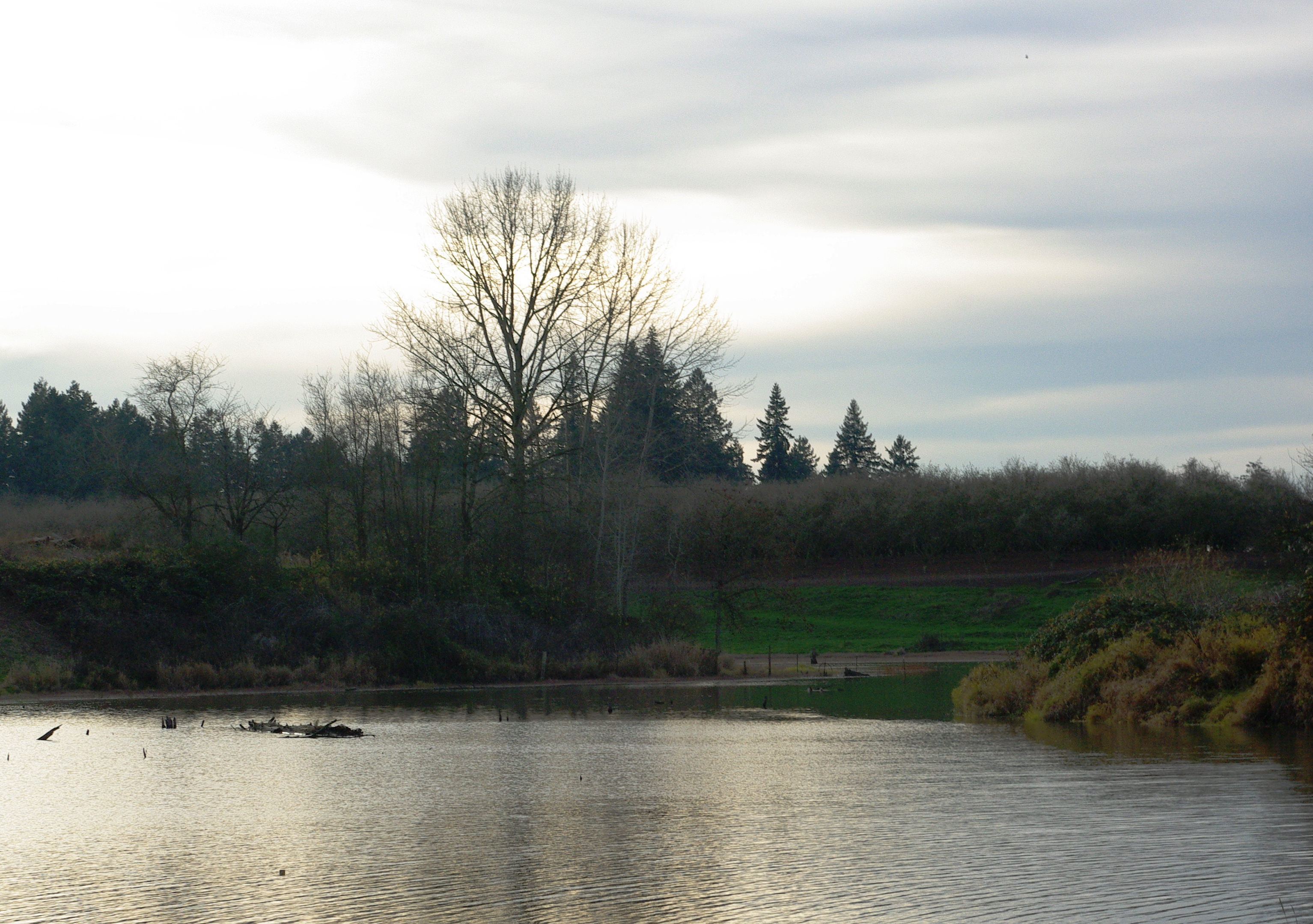
- Creek at St. Paul

- Location of the mouth of Mission Creek in Oregon

Location
- Country: United States
- State: Oregon
- County: Marion County

Physical characteristics
- Source: French Prairie
  - location: near St. Paul
  - coordinates: 45°10′16″N 122°59′33″W
  - elevation: 175 ft (53 m)
- Mouth: Champoeg Creek
  - location: near Champoeg
  - coordinates: 45°14′51″N 122°52′57″W
  - elevation: 72 ft (22 m)
- Length: 9 mi (14 km)

Mission Creek is a tributary, roughly 9 miles (14 km) long, of Champoeg Creek in Marion County in the U.S. state of Oregon. The creek arises southwest of St. Paul in the French Prairie region of the Willamette Valley and flows generally northeast to meet Champoeg Creek near Champoeg. The combined streams then flow less than 1 mile (1.6 km) before entering the Willamette River, 45 miles (72 km) from its confluence with the Columbia River.

== Course ==
From its source on French Prairie southwest of St. Paul, the creek flows northeast, passing under River Road Northeast and then under Oregon Route 219 just east of St. Paul. After entering and exiting Mission Creek Reservoir, it passes under Buyserie Road and enters Zorn Pond. Exiting the pond, it flows under McKay Road, then through the ghost town of Champoeg and under Champoeg Road. It joins Champoeg Creek in the Champoeg State Heritage Area, a short distance from the larger creek's confluence with the Willamette River. Champoeg's Creek's mouth is at river mile (RM) 45 or river kilometer (RK) 72 of the Willamette, a tributary of the Columbia River. Mission Creek has no named tributaries.

== See also ==
- List of rivers of Oregon
