= Champoeg Creek =

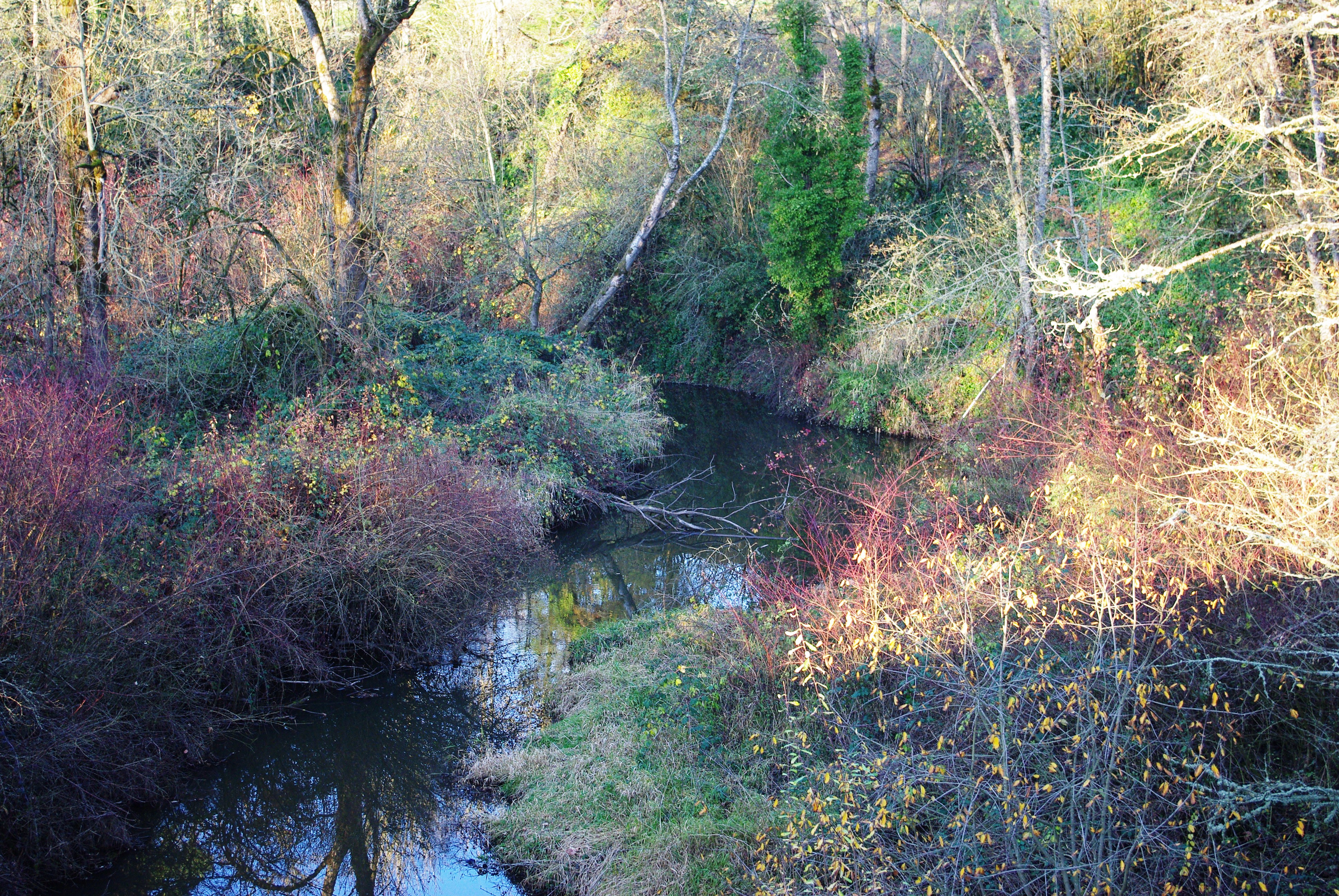
- The creek near Champoeg Road, looking north

- Location of the mouth of Champoeg Creek in Oregon

Location
- Country: United States
- State: Oregon
- County: Marion County

Physical characteristics
- Source: French Prairie
  - coordinates: 45°11′02″N 122°55′49″W
  - elevation: 121 ft (37 m)
- Mouth: Willamette River
  - location: near Champoeg
  - coordinates: 45°15′14″N 122°52′56″W
  - elevation: 62 ft (19 m)
- Length: 6 mi (9.7 km)

Champoeg Creek is a tributary, roughly 6 miles (9.7 km) long, of the Willamette River in the U.S. state of Oregon. The creek is formed by the confluence of its two forks in the French Prairie region of the Willamette Valley and flows generally northeast to meet the Willamette 45 miles (72 km) from the river's confluence with the Columbia River. Its course lies entirely in Marion County.

The name "Champoeg" comes from the Kalapuyan word [čʰámpuik], which might be an abbreviation of [čʰa-čʰíma-púičuk], referring to the edible root [púičuk], or yampa.

== Course ==
The creek begins at the confluence of East Fork Champoeg Creek and West Fork Champoeg Creek in French Prairie and flows generally northeast. The East Fork is about 5 miles (8.0 km) long, and the West Fork is about 6 miles (9.7 km) long. Not far from its source, Champoeg Creek enters McKay Reservoir then Spada Reservoir, where it passes under St. Paul Highway Northeast. Shortly thereafter, it receives Murphy Creek from the left. It passes under McKay Road Northeast and Champoeg Road Northeast before receiving Case Creek from the right and Mission Creek from the left in Champoeg State Heritage Area. Less than 1 mile (1.6 km) later, it enters the Willamette River 45 miles (72 km) from the larger stream's mouth on the Columbia River.

== See also ==
- List of rivers of Oregon
