= Colville, Washington =

- City
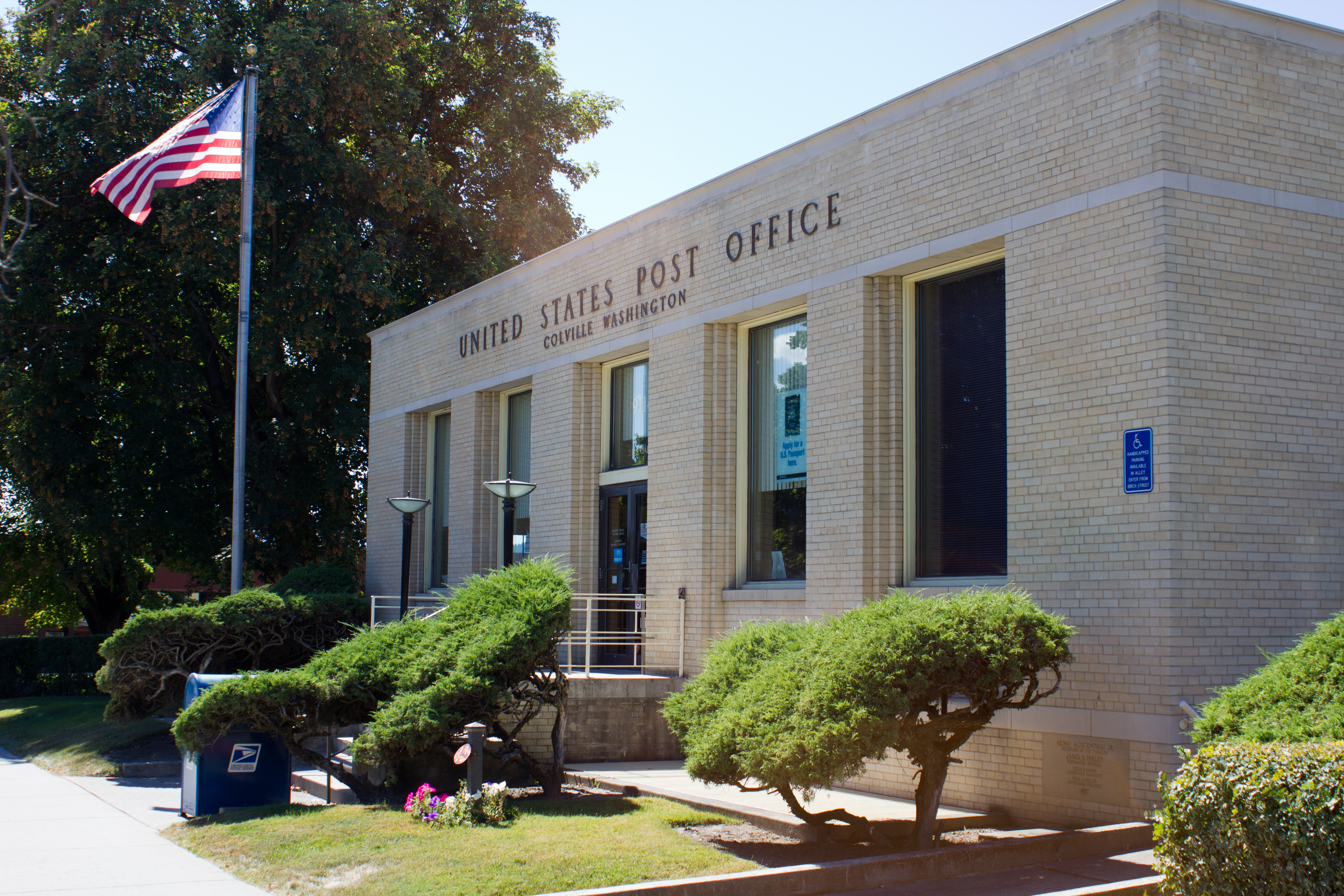
- Colville Post Office
- Interactive map of Colville, Washington
- Coordinates: 48.545448°N 117.898479°W
- Country: United States
- State: Washington
- County: Stevens
- Founded: 1859
- Incorporated: June 7, 1890

Government
  - Type: Mayor–council
  - Mayor: Jack Smith
  - City Council: Kim Gallo; Ben Cosby; Thomas Carpenter; Ben Nielsen; Robin Kurowski; Dick Nichols

Area
  - City: 30.882 sq mi (79.984 km^{2})
  - Land: 30.882 sq mi (79.984 km^{2})
  - Water: 0 sq mi (0.000 km^{2}) 0.0%
- Elevation: 1,647 ft (502 m)

Population (2020)
  - City: 4,917
  - Estimate (2024): 5,009
  - Density: 1,596/sq mi (616.4/km^{2})
  - Urban: 5,058
  - Metro: 49,015
  - Combined: 793,285 (US: 70th)
- Time zone: UTC−8 (Pacific (PST))
  - Summer (DST): UTC−7 (PDT)
- ZIP Code: 99114
- Area code: 509
- FIPS code: 53-14170
- GNIS feature ID: 2410205
- Website: colville.wa.us

Colville is a city in Stevens County, Washington, United States. The population was 4,917 at the 2020 census, and was estimated at 5,009 in 2024, It is the county seat of Stevens County.

== History ==
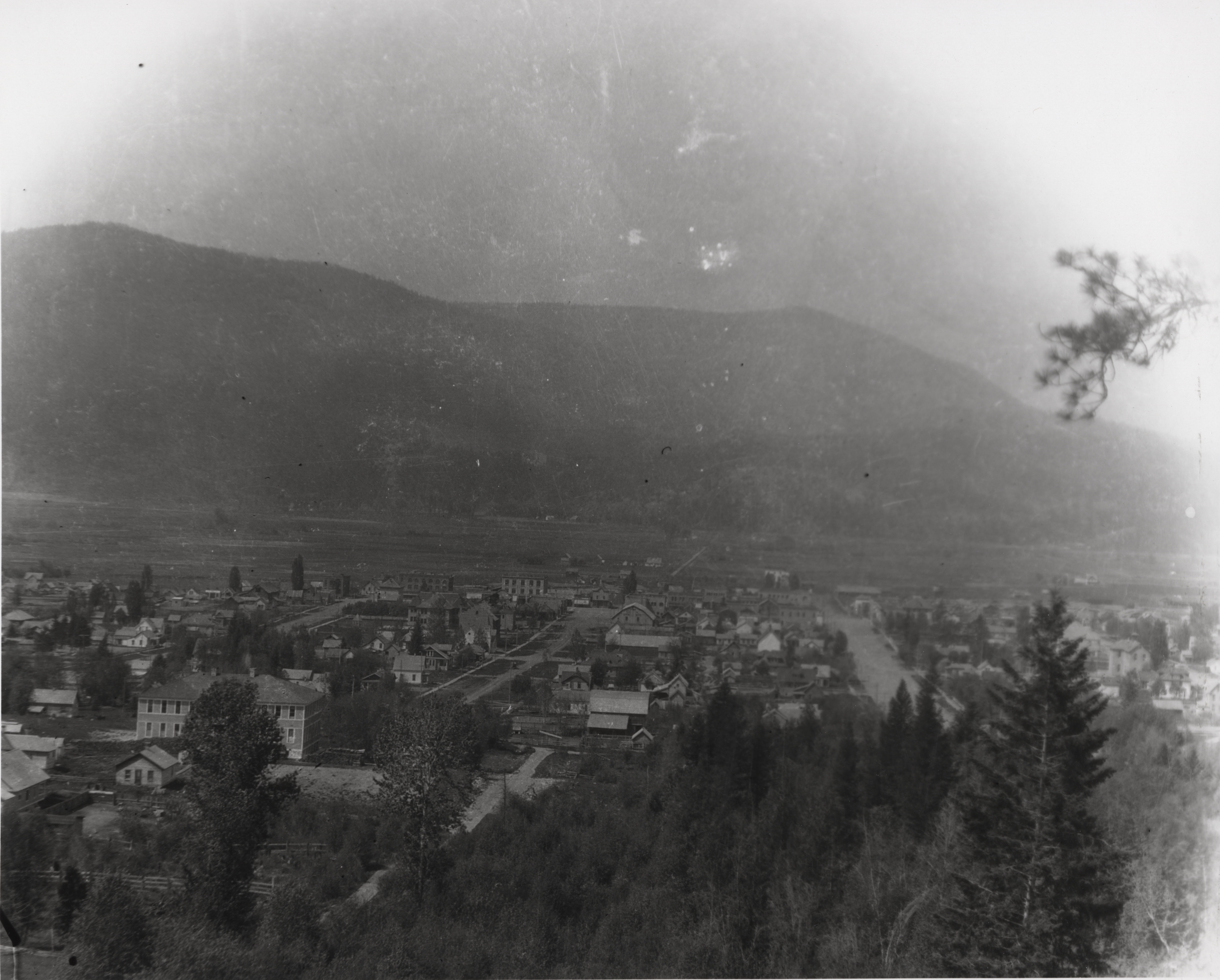
Colville, c. 1900

John Work, an agent for The Hudson's Bay Company, established Fort Colvile near the Kettle Falls fur trading site in 1825. It replaced the Spokane House and the Flathead Post as the main trading center on the Upper Columbia River. The area was named for Andrew Colvile, a Hudson's Bay Company governor. The fort continued to be used for some time as a center of mining and transportation/supply support associated with gold rushes in the 1850s, particularly the Fraser Canyon Gold Rush. After it was abandoned in 1870, some buildings stood until as late as 1910. The site was flooded by Lake Roosevelt after construction of the Grand Coulee Dam on the Columbia River.

Americans also wanted to operate in this territory. In the first half of the 19th century, the Oregon boundary dispute (or Oregon question) arose as a result of competing British and American claims to the Pacific Northwest. It was settled by the Oregon Treaty of 1846, which set the new boundary between Canada and the United States at the 49th Parallel, about Forty (40) miles to the north.

In 1859, the U.S. Army established a new Fort Colville at Pinkney City, Washington, about 3 miles NE of the current city of Colville. That fort was abandoned in 1882. In late 1871, with the resolution of Hudson's Bay Company land claims, Governor Edward Selig Salomon directed John Wynne to accept those lands which extended south to Orin-Rice Road, including some currently part of the City of Colville. With the planned closure of Fort Colville, businesses and buildings moved to the present location in the Colville River Valley prior to 1882. In January 1883, W. F. Hooker filed the first plat in Stevens County with the name "Belmont" or "Bellmond". He was encouraged to change the plat name to Colville so that the county seat could be moved to this location. On December 28, 1883, the Stevens County Board of County Commissioners, including county commissioner John U. Hofstetter, held a special session regarding the removal of county records to Belmont from the county seat of Colville, formerly called Pinkney City. In that meeting, commissioners allowed moving the county seat and jail to the town with the name of Colville, if proprietors provided a block of land for them without cost. County officers were allowed to move into a building owned by John U. Hofstetter for two years. On January 1, 1884, the Stevens County courthouse moved to Colville.

City tradition says that Colville was founded by John U. Hofstetter. With the arrival of the Spokane Falls and Northern Railway in the summer of 1889, eventually connecting Spokane, Washington with Vancouver, British Columbia via the Canadian Pacific Railway, the fledgling community experienced a brief boom period which saw the establishment of the region's first bank and the construction of several substantial brick structures. Colville officially incorporated as a city on June 7, 1890.

In the 1950s, the Colville Air Force Station was developed and operated 14.7 miles north and east of Colville as part of the Air Defense Command's network of radar stations. A few buildings remain at the site today. It is used largely by paint-ballers.

== Geography ==
According to the United States Census Bureau, the city has a total area of 3.088 square miles (8.00 km^{2}), all land.

=== Climate ===
This climatic region is typified by large seasonal temperature differences, with warm to hot (and often humid) summers and cold (sometimes severely cold) winters. According to the Köppen Climate Classification system, Colville has a continental Mediterranean climate, abbreviated Dsb on climate maps.

Climate data for Colville, Washington (1991–2020 normals, extremes 1899–1952, 1993–present)
Month	Jan	Feb	Mar	Apr	May	Jun	Jul	Aug	Sep	Oct	Nov	Dec	Year
Record high °F (°C)	57 (14)	63 (17)	76 (24)	92 (33)	96 (36)	112 (44)	109 (43)	106 (41)	102 (39)	91 (33)	75 (24)	58 (14)	112 (44)
Mean daily maximum °F (°C)	34.3 (1.3)	41.9 (5.5)	52.8 (11.6)	62.5 (16.9)	72.2 (22.3)	78.3 (25.7)	88.4 (31.3)	88.5 (31.4)	78.2 (25.7)	60.6 (15.9)	43.5 (6.4)	34.2 (1.2)	61.3 (16.3)
Daily mean °F (°C)	28.8 (−1.8)	32.9 (0.5)	41.1 (5.1)	48.9 (9.4)	57.6 (14.2)	63.4 (17.4)	70.5 (21.4)	69.7 (20.9)	61.0 (16.1)	47.5 (8.6)	36.2 (2.3)	28.8 (−1.8)	48.9 (9.4)
Mean daily minimum °F (°C)	23.2 (−4.9)	23.9 (−4.5)	29.5 (−1.4)	35.3 (1.8)	43.0 (6.1)	48.6 (9.2)	52.6 (11.4)	51.0 (10.6)	43.8 (6.6)	34.5 (1.4)	28.9 (−1.7)	23.5 (−4.7)	36.5 (2.5)
Record low °F (°C)	−29 (−34)	−29 (−34)	−15 (−26)	12 (−11)	24 (−4)	28 (−2)	31 (−1)	29 (−2)	20 (−7)	4 (−16)	−11 (−24)	−23 (−31)	−29 (−34)
Average precipitation inches (mm)	2.20 (56)	1.47 (37)	1.89 (48)	1.53 (39)	1.93 (49)	2.14 (54)	0.83 (21)	0.68 (17)	0.72 (18)	1.51 (38)	2.19 (56)	2.80 (71)	19.89 (505)
Average snowfall inches (cm)	14.5 (37)	5.4 (14)	2.7 (6.9)	0.2 (0.51)	0.0 (0.0)	0.0 (0.0)	0.0 (0.0)	0.0 (0.0)	0.0 (0.0)	0.0 (0.0)	5.6 (14)	15.0 (38)	43.4 (110)
Average precipitation days (≥ 0.01 in)	11.9	9.5	11.4	9.5	10.3	8.9	4.7	3.6	4.9	9.1	12.2	11.9	107.9
Average snowy days (≥ 0.1 in)	7.6	4.3	2.0	0.2	0.0	0.0	0.0	0.0	0.0	0.1	3.0	7.7	24.9
Source: NOAA

== Economy ==
The area's economy was historically centered by agriculture, timber, and mining; by the 21st century, this had shifted to the retail, medical, and government services sectors. Colville is home to regional offices for the Washington State Department of Natural Resources as well as the headquarters of the Colville National Forest, which is managed by the U.S. Forest Service. A joint dispatch center, named the Northeast Washington Interagency Communications Center, was formed by state and federal agencies in 2008 to respond to wildfires. Major private employers include Boise Cascade, Vaagen Brothers, Hewes Marine, Colmac Coil Manufacturing, Colmac Industries, and Delta Dental of Washington.

== Demographics ==
Historical population
Census	Pop.	Note	%±
1880	67		—
1890	539		704.5%
1900	594		10.2%
1910	1,533		158.1%
1920	1,718		12.1%
1930	1,803		4.9%
1940	2,418		34.1%
1950	3,033		25.4%
1960	3,806		25.5%
1970	3,742		−1.7%
1980	4,510		20.5%
1990	4,360		−3.3%
2000	4,988		14.4%
2010	4,673		−6.3%
2020	4,917		5.2%
2024 (est.)	5,009		1.9%
U.S. Decennial Census; 2020 Census

=== 2020 census ===
As of the 2020 census, the city had a population of 4,917. The median age was 42.7 years. 21.0% of residents were under the age of 18 and 23.4% of residents were 65 years of age or older. For every 100 females there were 89.4 males, and for every 100 females age 18 and over there were 86.8 males.

99.3% of residents lived in urban areas, while 0.7% lived in rural areas.

There were 2,149 households in the city, of which 25.2% had children under the age of 18 living in them. Of all households, 38.4% were married-couple households, 20.1% were households with a male householder and no spouse or partner present, and 34.5% were households with a female householder and no spouse or partner present. About 38.8% of all households were made up of individuals and 19.1% had someone living alone who was 65 years of age or older.

There were 2,278 housing units, of which 5.7% were vacant. The homeowner vacancy rate was 1.8% and the rental vacancy rate was 4.6%.

Racial composition as of the 2020 census
Race	Number	Percent
White	4,267	86.8%
Black or African American	11	0.2%
American Indian and Alaska Native	86	1.7%
Asian	44	0.9%
Native Hawaiian and Other Pacific Islander	9	0.2%
Some other race	74	1.5%
Two or more races	426	8.7%
Hispanic or Latino (of any race)	251	5.1%

=== 2010 census ===
As of the 2010 census, there were 4,673 people, 2,043 households, and 1,161 families residing in the city. The population density was 1,594.9 inhabitants per square mile (615.8/km^{2}). There were 2,221 housing units at an average density of 758.0 per square mile (292.7/km^{2}). The racial makeup of the city was 92.4% White, 0.1% African American, 2.1% Native American, 0.9% Asian, 0.2% Pacific Islander, 1.2% from some other races and 3.0% from two or more races. Hispanic or Latino people of any race were 3.8% of the population.

There were 2,043 households, of which 28.8% had children under the age of 18 living with them, 40.1% were married couples living together, 12.8% had a female householder with no husband present, 3.9% had a male householder with no wife present, and 43.2% were non-families. 38.4% of all households were made up of individuals, and 16.9% had someone living alone who was 65 years of age or older. The average household size was 2.22 and the average family size was 2.95.

The median age in the city was 40.4 years. 24% of residents were under the age of 18; 7.7% were between the ages of 18 and 24; 22.6% were from 25 to 44; 26.9% were from 45 to 64; and 18.9% were 65 years of age or older. The gender makeup of the city was 45.8% male and 54.2% female.

=== 2000 census ===
As of the 2000 census, there were 4,988 people, 2,090 households, and 1,262 families residing in the city. The population density was 2,079.8 inhabitants per square mile (803.0/km^{2}). There were 2,219 housing units at an average density of 925.2 per square mile (357.2/km^{2}). The racial makeup of the city was 92.74% White, 0.16% African American, 2.17% Native American, 0.50% Asian, 0.24% Pacific Islander, 0.88% from some other races and 3.31% from two or more races. Hispanic or Latino people of any race were 2.35% of the population.

There were 2,090 households out of which 32.5% had children under the age of 18 living with them, 44.9% were married couples living together, 12.0% had a female householder with no husband present, and 39.6% were non-families. 35.5% of all households were made up of individuals and 17.1% had someone living alone who was 65 years of age or older. The average household size was 2.30 and the average family size was 2.98.

In the city the population was spread out with 26.8% under the age of 18, 8.2% from 18 to 24, 24.6% from 25 to 44, 21.9% from 45 to 64, and 18.5% who were 65 years of age or older. The median age was 39 years. For every 100 females there were 83.8 males. For every 100 females age 18 and over, there were 78.7 males.

The median income for a household in the city was $27,988, and the median income for a family was $40,466. Males had a median income of $32,066 versus $21,782 for females. The per capita income for the city was $18,031. About 10.4% of families and 15.5% of the population were below the poverty line, including 14.9% of those under age 18 and 15.7% of those age 65 or over.

== Government ==
As of 2024, the City of Colville operated on a $14.2 million revenue and employed 49 staff. Court services were contracted through Stevens County.

== Media ==
The Statesman-Examiner is a weekly newspaper based in Colville that provides coverage to most of Stevens County. It was founded in 1896 as the Statesman Index and was merged with a rival Colville paper, the Examiner, in 1948.

== Notable people ==
- Charles Day, Gold medal Olympic rower (Berlin - 1936)
- William Foege, leader in smallpox eradication and former U.S. CDC Director
