= Saint Paul Mission Historical Society - Oregon =

Saint Paul Mission Historical Society
- Formation: 1976
- Headquarters: PO Box 158 St. Paul, OR. 97137
- Region served: Oregon's French Prairie
- Website: https://spmhs.com/

The Saint Paul Mission Historical Society (SPMHS) is a non-profit organization whose purpose is the "preservation of the history of early Oregon and the French Prairie region of the Willamette Valley." It was incorporated on June 1, 1976, by Joe McKay, St. Paul postmaster and chair of the St. Paul Bicentennial Commission.

The SPMHS owns and maintains two historic St. Paul homes, hosts thousands of St Paul and French Prairie images and articles on its website, and commemorates local notable figures like William Cannon, the only known Revolutionary War veteran to be buried in Oregon.

The Society was influential in creating the St. Paul Historic District, which is on the National Register of Historic Places.

== Early activities ==
The SPMHS publishes a newsletter. Its inaugural issue came out on August 9, 1976.

Later in August 1976, the Emmett Kirk house was moved from the corner of Main Street NE and Mission Avenue NE to the corner of Second Street NE and Mission Avenue NE where it was to become the Society's museum. Dan Brockman, the building owner, donated it to the Society. In October 1976, the Society received 1,000 Catholic Church Records of the Pacific Northwest, Vancouver Register books from Joe Warner. The sale of these books went into a book fund that was used to pay for Society expenditures.

Also in October 1976, the Society held its first annual meeting.

In April 1977 Joe Mc Kay and associates established the following road changes to define French Prairie:

- Restoration of the name Champoeg Road to Market Roads 12 and 414
- Naming part of Highway 219 as French Prairie Road
- Naming part of Market Road 36 as River Road.

=== Home tours ===
In May 1977 the Society held its first annual historic house tours. The first houses were:

- The Zorn House near Champoeg
- The Dan Smith home in St. Paul
- The Helen Austin home (Stokely Jones DLC) near Champoeg
- The Claudio Bustamante home (Augustin Raymond DLC) near St. Paul.

At the time the $3.50 tickets included strawberry shortcake and the opportunity to meet Harriet Duncan Munnick, author of the Catholic Church Records of the Pacific Northwest.

== St. Paul homes and historical district ==
In 1981, the SPMHS sponsored a proposal to create the St. Paul Historical District. In 1982, the St. Paul core area, containing 92 structures, was designated a national historic district and placed on the National Register of Historic Places.

In 1980, Mrs. Al Powers, an early SPMHS member, purchased land located directly north of the Saint Paul Fire Department on Mission Ave., NE. She moved the Matthew Murphy house to the property and had it restored.

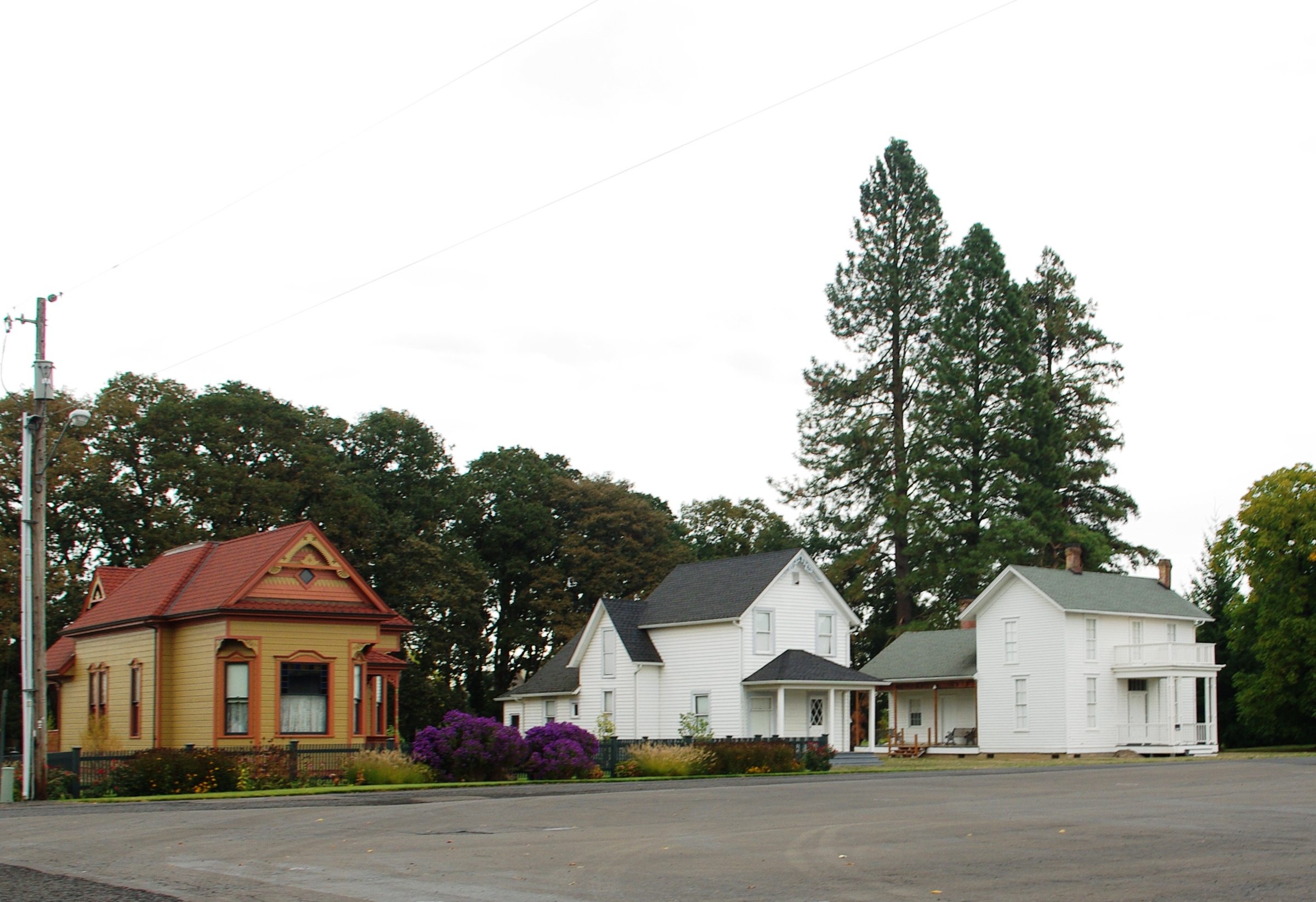
Three SPMHS houses

The Dr. F. X. Theodore Brentano house was donated by the St. Paul Rodeo and moved to the property in 1994.

To maintain their budget, the SPMHS sold the Kirk House in 2003.

== Archaeological sites ==
With settlement by retired French Canadian fur trade hunters dating to the early 1830s, French Prairie was a natural location for archaeological digs. In 1986 and 1987 David Brauner from Oregon State University brought students to St. Paul for a project locating the site where the Sisters of Notre Dame De Namur lived when they operated a school. Rebecca McClelland Poet wrote up the findings in her thesis, "Women of Valor: the Sisters of Notre Dame De Namur, St. Paul, Oregon, 1844 - 1852."

The results added to St. Paul's history. As time went on, Dr. Brauner became a society director, provided storage for St. Paul artifacts at the Historical Archaeology department at Oregon State University, provided Historical Archaeology department interns to work on collected St. Paul artifacts, and was a guest speaker at Society meetings.

== Collections ==
Over the years Joe McKay collected thousands of St. Paul artifacts. He knew their provenance, and he could relate every detail, but few artifacts were labelled. In addition, historian Harriet D. Munnick amassed a large archival collection pertaining to the early settlers of St. Paul and Champoeg, and she donated it to the SPMHS.

In 2005 funds provided by the Helen E. Austin Pioneer Fund (later Oregon Community Fund) allowed the Society to digitize many of these items. The SPMHS website includes the following collections:

- McKay and Munnick items. See the "Collections" tab.
- Historical articles about French Prairie and the other settlers. See the "Stories" and "Articles" tabs.
- The newsletter archive
