= Lugenbeel County, South Dakota =

U.S. former county from 1875 to 1909

Coordinates: 43°08′30″N 101°41′02″W

Lugenbeel County was a former county in South Dakota, United States. The county's name originated from Pinkney Lugenbeel, a military commander in the area. Originally part of the Dakota Territory, the district in 1889 became a part of the state of South Dakota. The county existed until June 2, 1909, at which point both Lugenbeel County and Meyer County were absorbed into Bennett County, Todd County, and Mellette County, respectively.
