= Pinkney Lugenbeel =

United States Army colonel (1819–1886)

Pinkney Lugenbeel (November 16, 1819 – March 18, 1886) was a career United States Army officer who served during the Seminole Wars, Mexican–American War, the American Civil War, and the later American Indian Wars, retiring as a colonel in 1880.

== Career ==
Pinkney Lugenbeel was born in Libertytown, Maryland and was appointed as a cadet to the United States Military Academy at West Point, New York in 1835. Lugenbeel took five years to complete his training, graduating 28th in his class of 1840, which included future Union Army generals William T. Sherman and George Henry Thomas and Confederate States Army generals Richard S. Ewell and Bushrod Johnson.

After appointment as brevet second lieutenant in the army's Fifth Infantry Regiment, Lugenbeel served on the frontier.

In 1863 Major Lugenbeel led a cavalry company from Walla Walla, Washington, to the Boise Valley and reestablished Fort Boise in what soon would become Boise.

== Legacy ==
Lugenbeel had one child who died in infancy.

Lugenbeel died in Detroit, Michigan, in 1886. Lugenbeel County, South Dakota was named for him, as was Pinkney City, Washington (located three miles northeast of Colville). He was also credited with improving and building up the Fort Walla Walla–Fort Colville Military Road.
