= Fort Colville =

- Near Colville, Washington in United States
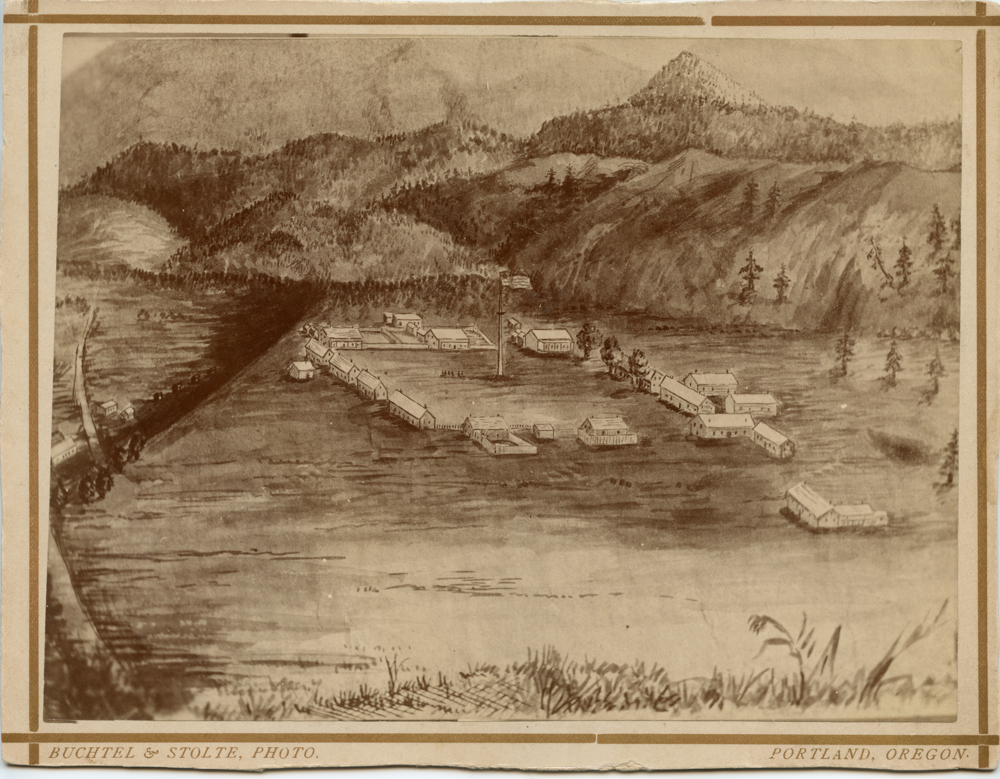

Site information
- Owner: United States Army

Location
- Location in the United States Location in Washington
- Coordinates: 48°34′19″N 117°52′44″W

Site history
- Built: December 19, 1859
- In use: 1859–1882
- Materials: Timber
- Fate: Abandoned in 1882

Garrison information
- Past commanders: Pinkney Lugenbeel (1859–1861); James F. Curtis (1861–1862); William R. Abercrombie (1871–1872)

Fort Colville was a U.S. Army post in the Washington Territory located three miles (5 km) north of current Colville, Washington. During its existence from 1859 to 1882, it was called "Harney's Depot" and "Colville Depot" during the first two years, and finally "Fort Colville". Brigadier General William S. Harney, commander of the Department of Oregon, opened up the district north of the Snake River to settlers in 1858 and ordered Brevet Major Pinkney Lugenbeel, 9th Infantry Regiment to establish a military post to restrain the Indians lately hostile to the U.S. Army's Northwest Division and to protect miners who flooded into the area after first reports of gold in the area appeared in Western Washington newspapers in July 1855.

It was common practice to use existing Indian trails to develop military roads, and only make necessary improvements for the movement of artillery or supply trains. Brevet Major Lugenbeel followed the long established Hudson's Bay Company Brigade Trail from the Fort Walla Walla area to Fort Colvile (Hudson's Bay Company), but had to leave the trail at the current Orin-Rice Road, two miles south of Colville, when the southernmost land claims of the Hudson's Bay Company started. Washington Territorial Governor Isaac Stevens and the U.S. Army were ordered by the U.S. Department of State to honor land ownership claims by the Hudson's Bay Company. The road became the Fort Walla Walla Fort Colville Military Road. Lugenbeel's command arrived from Fort Walla Walla on June 20, 1859.

Major Lugenbeel was appointed special agent for the Indians in the region located near Fort Colville. After Lugenbeel departed, the Indian agent was a civilian. U.S. President Ulysses S. Grant and the U.S. Congress to reduce corruption in the handling of Indian Affairs created, in 1869, the Board of Indian Commissioners The Indian agent for the Colville, Sinixt, Sanpoil, Syilx, Spokane, and early on the Pend d'Oreilles moved from the fort to Chewelah, Washington by 1872.

== Building the fort ==
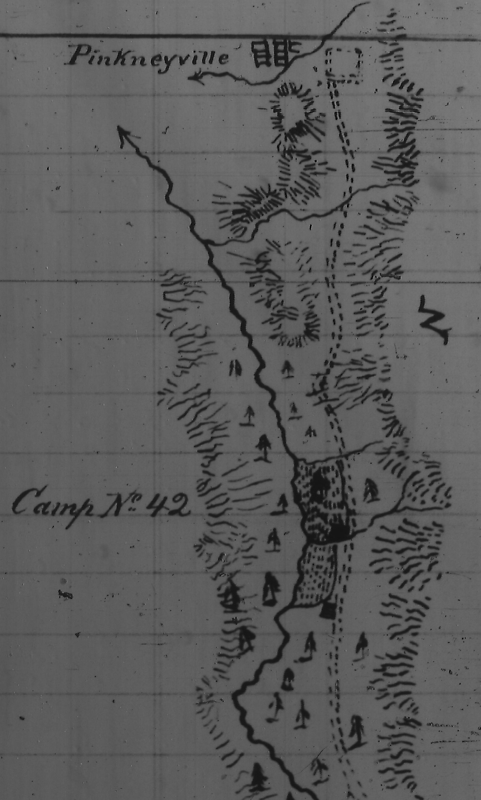
On September 28, 1860, 1st Lieutenant August V. Kautz arrived at Fort Colville with 150 recruits. Map shows the last five miles of the route.

Brevet Major Lugenbeel was directed to build a four-company post able to house 300 men and the U.S. Northwest Boundary Commission personnel. A sawmill owned by R. H. Douglas was two miles from the post at Douglas Falls, but he wanted twice as much as normal for the lumber. Lugenbeel built a sawmill for the fort a half-mile up on Mill Creek to keep costs down.

The U.S. Northwest Boundary Survey personnel arrived at the fort on December 3, 1859, but the buildings assigned to them were not complete. Temperatures were down to −22 °F and they were housed in tents until December 19, 1859. The newly competed buildings were solid and warm and home to the survey personnel for two years as they surveyed and cut the border on the 49th parallel to the Rocky Mountains.

A small town developed outside the post, Pinkney City, Washington, the name derived from Lugenbeel's first name. In 1860, Pinkney City, became the original Spokane County, Washington county seat, and in 1864, when Spokane County and Stevens County, Washington merged, it remained the county seat for Stevens County. From 1860 to January 1864, Spokane County used the fort jail for any incarcerations.

On September 28, 1860, First Lieutenant August V. Kautz arrived at Fort Colville with 150 recruits. His journal recorded the route from Coeur d'Alene to the fort along the road built by the U. S. Northwest Boundary Commission above the Spokane River and then along the Fort Walla Walla Fort Colville Military Road.

== Fort Colville during the American Civil War ==
When the American Civil War started in 1861, officers were ordered to renew their Oath of Allegiance, with four officers eventually resigning to serve with the Confederate States of America. As the Civil War started, Lugenbeel was ordered to take his two companies of regular army to Fort Walla Walla in November 1861, to be replaced by volunteers.

=== Volunteers man the post ===
Taking over in late 1861 were C and D Companies, 4th California Infantry Regiment. Locals considered these troops, with some recruited from Alcatrez Prison, as a bad lot including one of the fort's lieutenants who murdered John Burt.

On July 11, 1862, B and C Companies, 1st Regiment Washington Territory Volunteer Infantry, took over the fort.

On May 26, 1865, one company of the 1st Oregon Volunteer Infantry Regiment took over the fort.

== Return of the U.S. Army regular troops ==
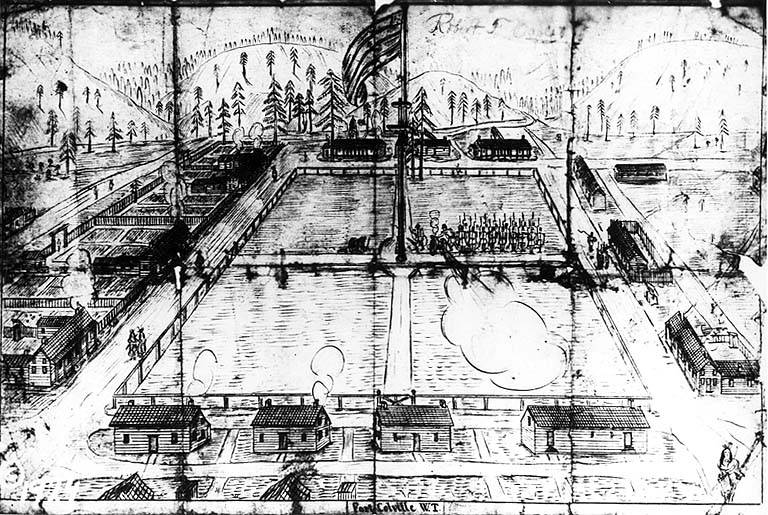
Drawing of buildings and grounds, 1860

On November 3, 1865, regular troops G Company, 14th Infantry Regiment of the U.S. Army, returned to man the fort. On February 18, 1867, soldiers of G Company killed Deputy Sheriff Horace P. Stewart as he tried to break up a beating of his business partner, Jack Shaw, at the saloon owned by both men.

On 6 May 1867, G Company, 23rd Infantry Regiment, took over responsibility for the fort.

On February 10, 1869, Company D, 23rd Infantry, took over manning the fort.

On June 10, 1872, E Company, 21st Infantry Regiment, took over manning the fort.

=== Cavalry troops assigned for the first time ===
In 1875, for the first time cavalry troops were assigned to the fort, when E Company was reinforced by M Company, 1st Cavalry Regiment. Accommodations for horses were added to the fort. In 1876, Indian unrest in the Montana Territory continued to show the need for the fort. In 1877, many soldiers who had been stationed at Fort Colville took part in the pursuit and battles with the Nez Perce.

On October 21, 1880, Fort Spokane was established by the U.S. Army at the junction of the Columbia and Spokane Rivers. Cavalry often stayed at Fort Colville due to a scarcity of hay and grain around Fort Spokane until the summer of 1885.

One of the last actions from the fort was First Lieutenant's Henry H. Pierce's expedition from Fort Colville to Puget Sound, Washington Territory by way of Lake Chelan and Skagit River August and September 1882.

Nine months after the garrison was withdrawn, Commanding General of the United States Army William Tecumseh Sherman visited Fort Colville in August 1883 in a tour of Army posts in the west.

== Post closed ==
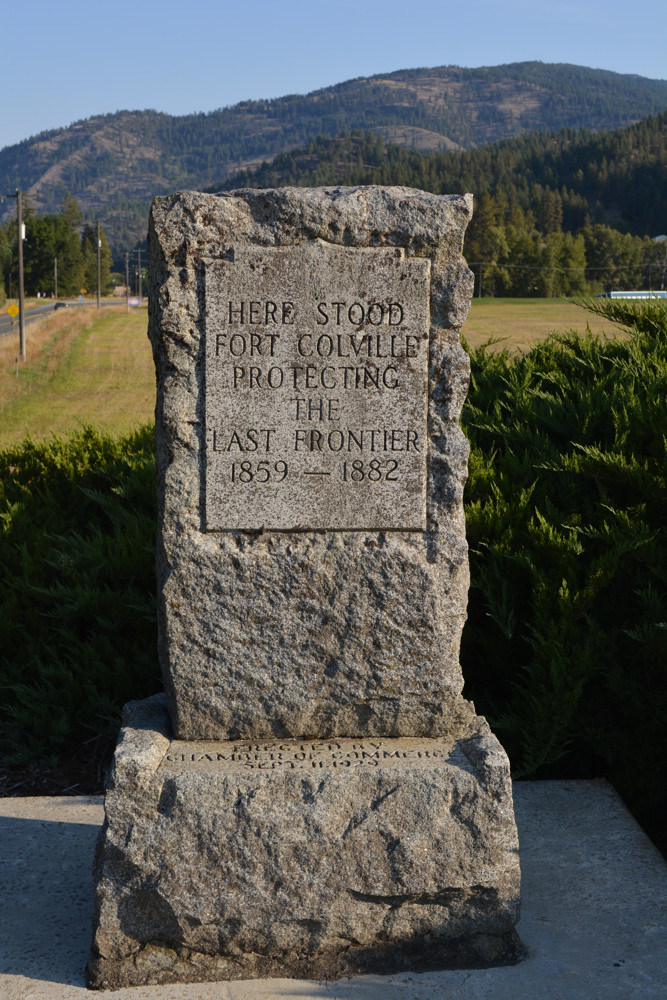
Fort Colville Monument with Old Dominion Mountain in background. Stevens County, Washington

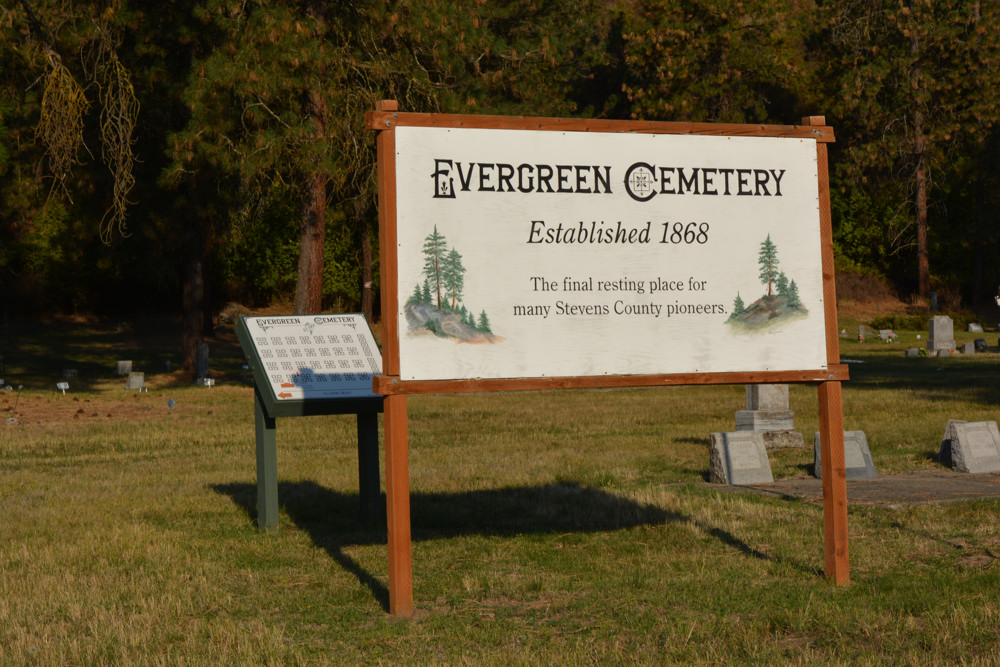
Sign for the Evergreen Cemetery established 1868. Stevens County, Washington

Fort Colville was closed in 1882. On September 11, 1929, Colville civic leaders dedicated a monument to the fort.

The bodies of soldiers who died while serving at the fort were disinterred and moved to the Presidio of San Francisco and the San Francisco National Cemetery. Those that stayed in the area are likely buried at the Evergreen Cemetery established immediately west of the old fort.

== Notables associated with Fort Colville ==
- In 1859, Captain John Mullan came to Fort Colville to ascertain improvement to the Fort Walla Walla Fort Colville Military Road in preparation for building the Mullan Road.
- First Lieutenant John Grubb Parke was chief astronomer, surveyor, and topographical engineer for the U.S. Northwest Boundary Commission in 1859. He later served as a general in the Civil War, and retired after serving as the Superintendent, U.S. Military Academy.
- Captain John Wesley Frazer commanded C Company, 9th Infantry and helped build Fort Colville in 1859. He was a Brigadier General in the Confederacy.
- First Lieutenant Nathaniel Wickliffe, served at Fort Colville in 1860 and resigned his commission to serve with the 5th Mississippi Cavalry.
- Joseph Smith Harris was part of the U.S. Northwest Boundary Commission stationed at the fort 1859–1861.
- Second Lieutenant Charles Garrison Harker was part of the escort duty for the U.S. Northwest Boundary Commission in 1859. He was a U.S. Army brigadier general in the Civil War and he died in Battle of Kennesaw Mountain on June 27, 1864.
- First Lieutenant George W. Carr, left in 1861 to serve with the 57th Virginia Infantry for the Confederacy.
- Captain James J. Archer, commander Co I, 9th Infantry protected the U.S. Northwest Boundary Commission and served at the fort. He served as a Brigadier General in the Confederate Army.
- Captain Crawford Fletcher commanded Company K, 9th Infantry in 1861 when the fort was built and resigned his commission to join the Confederate Army.
- Major James Freeman Curtis commanded Company C and D, 4th California Infantry Regiment. His command consisted partially of men released from Alcatraz Island to form two companies. He served in the Civil War and was retroactively promoted to Brigadier General. He became the Idaho Secretary of State in 1892.
- Major C. W. Rumrill took over the post in 1862 with B and C Company, 1st Regiment Washington Territory Volunteer Infantry.
- Captain Fredinand O. McCown in 1865 with one company of the 1st Oregon Volunteer Infantry Regiment, took over command the fort. McCown served three terms as mayor of Oregon City, Oregon and was a co-founder of the Oregon City Electric Company.
- Captain George L. Browning on February 10, 1869, with D Company, 23rd Infantry Regiment and took over the fort. He later took part in the Battle of the Big Hole.
- First Lieutenant William R. Abercrombie was commander of the E Company, 2nd Infantry when he took over the fort in 1871. After an extensive U.S. Army career, Fort Abercrombie, Alaska was named after him, as was Abercrombie Mountain in Stevens County.
- Captain Evan Miles on June 10, 1872, with E Company, 21st Infantry Regiment took over the fort. He commanded a battalion during the Paiute War.
- Captain Moses Harris, who commanded the fort from 1875 to 1878, received the Medal of Honor during the Civil War.
- Second Lieutenant Frederick S. Foltz, H Company, 1st Cavalry served at the fort in 1878. He led the 91st Division as commanding general when they went overseas to fight in World War I.
- George Washington Goethals arrived at Fort Colville in advance of General Sherman's tour of army posts in 1883. He directed building the Panama Canal to completion.
- Major William F. Drum, last commander of Fort Colville in 1882. He joined the 2nd Ohio Infantry as a private, rose to the rank of lieutenant colonel in the Civil War. He was the commanding officer of Fort Yates, North Dakota when he died on July 4, 1892.
- John U. Hofstetter, a soldier at the fort when it was built. He left the service and stayed in the area. He was a Spokane and Stevens County Commissioner, Sheriff, and founding father of the City of Colville.

== Sources ==
- Graham, Patrick J. (2006), Colville Collection Book Two Military Fort Colville, 1859 to 1882, Colville, Washington: Statesman-Examiner, ISBN 0970565437
- Returns From U.S. Military Posts, 1859-1882 (Microfilm Publication M617, Roll 240) and Records of the Adjutant General's Office, 1780s-1917 (Record Group 94), Washington, D.C.: National Archives – via viewed on Ancestry.com
- Report of the Commissioner of Indian Affairs Accompanying the Annual Report of the Secretary of the Interior for the year 1859, Washington: Office of Indian Affairs (George W. Bowman, printer), 1860
- The Official History of the Washington National Guard, Volume III: Washington Territorial Militia in the Civil War (PDF), Headquarters, Military Department, State of Washington Office of the Adjutant General (Washington National Guard), c. 1967, WASH ANG PAM 210-1-3 – via Washington National Guard State Historical Society
- The Official History of the Washington National Guard, Volume IV, Washington Territorial Militia in the Philippine Insurrection (PDF), Headquarters, Military Department, State of Washington Office of the Adjutant General (Washington National Guard), c. 1967, WASH ANG PAM 210-1-4 – via Washington National Guard State Historical Society
- Slater, John B (1904), Proceeding of Stevens County Pioneer Association 1903, Colville, Washington: Stevens County Reveille, Printers – via Crossroads Archive
- Oakshott, Thomas I. (1960), Colville ... City of Proud Heritage, Colville, Washington: Statesman-Examiner
- Streeter, Anne P. (2012), Joseph S. Harris and The U.S. Northwest Boundary Survey, 1857-1861, Trafford Publishing, ISBN 9781466936232
