= Kettle Falls =

Historical waterfall on the Columbia River in Washington (state), United States

Coordinates: 48.639346°N 118.109436°W

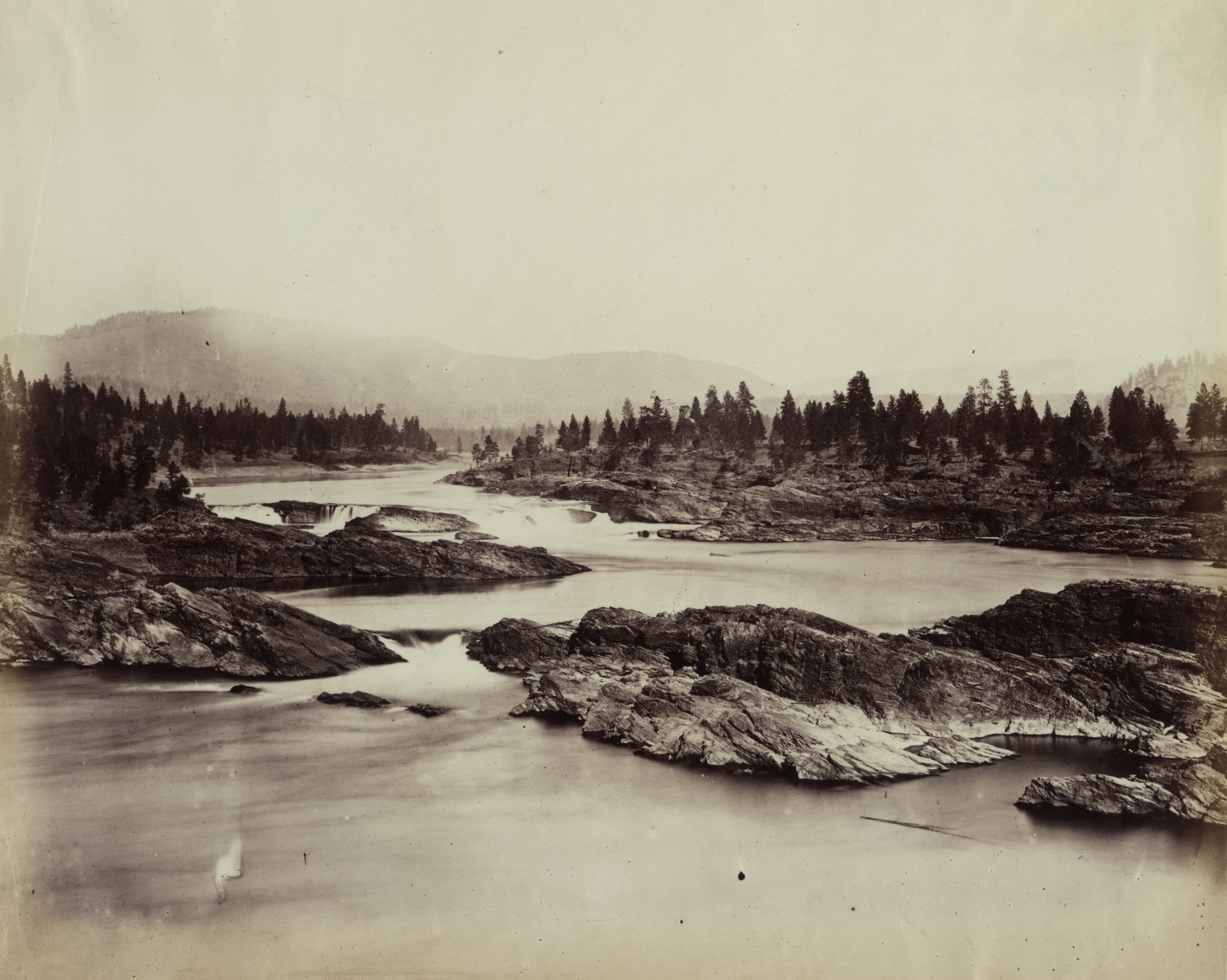
Kettle Falls in 1860

Kettle Falls (Salish: Shonitkwu, meaning "roaring or noisy waters", also Schwenetekoo translated as "Keep Sounding Water") was an ancient and important salmon fishing site on the upper reaches of the Columbia River, in what is today the U.S. state of Washington, near the Canada–US border. The falls consisted of a series of rapids and cascades where the river passed through quartzite rocks deposited by prehistoric floods on a substrate of Columbia River basalt. The river dropped nearly 50 feet (15 m), and the sound of the falls could be heard for miles away. Kettle Falls was inundated in 1940, as the waters of the reservoir Lake Roosevelt rose behind Grand Coulee Dam, permanently flooding the site.

== History ==
At least nine thousand years ago Paleo-Indian cultures gathered at Kettle Falls to fish and gather foods. Interior Salish-speaking people arrived about two thousand years ago, and gradually the falls became the center of an extensive network of Native American trade based on a salmon economy. Native peoples came from coastal areas in the west and from the Great Plains in the east to fish, trade, and socialize with the bands of the Columbia River Plateau. Up to fourteen tribes met regularly at Kettle Falls during the salmon spawning season from June to October. They stood on rocks near the shore or on Indian Island in the middle of the falls, fishing with spears and distinctive J-shaped baskets. In his memoir White Grizzly Bear's Legacy: Learning to be Indian, Lawney Reyes described the cultural and economic significance of the falls for his people, the Sinixt, and explained the role of subsistence fishing in maintaining salmon populations: "The bands moved to the banks of the river and caught the salmon that were not strong enough to clear the falls. This method of fishing made sure that only the strongest fish went on to spawn."

The Canadian mapmaker and explorer David Thompson was the first white person to describe the upper portion of the Columbia River. He arrived at Kettle Falls on June 19, 1811, naming it Ilth koy ape, a local name for the baskets the native peoples used to catch fish. Thompson spent two weeks at the falls, preparing for his journey downriver and observing the native fishing culture. He described the village area as "a kind of general rendezvous for news, trade, and settling disputes, in which these villagers acted as arbitrators, never joining any war party". The fur traders of the Hudson's Bay Company established a presence at nearby Fort Colvile in 1825. The Jesuit priest Pierre-Jean De Smet visited the area in 1841 and found native people catching up to 3,000 fish a day. The Jesuits established St. Paul's Mission at the falls in 1845. The original town of Kettle Falls was established in 1891 by speculators from Spokane. They built a large hotel on the river overlooking the falls and envisioned a glamorous resort town, but the railroad bypassed the settlement, and the resort never grew much larger than 300 residents.

=== Flooding by Grand Coulee Dam ===
Kettle Falls was flooded in 1940, when the Grand Coulee Dam impounded the Columbia River to create Lake Roosevelt. The waters behind the dam rose 380 feet (120 m), flooding more than 21,000 acres (85 km^{2}) of prime bottomland along the river where native peoples lived, as well as the original town of Kettle Falls. In June 1940, an estimated 8,000 to 10,000 people mourned the falls at a "Ceremony of Tears" organized by the Colville people and attended by representatives of the Yakama, Spokane, Nez Perce, Flathead, Blackfeet, Coeur d'Alene, Tulalip, and Pend d'Oreilles tribes.

Native burial grounds on Indian Island were moved, and the town of Kettle Falls was relocated to the present site of Kettle Falls, Washington. In addition to submerging the falls, Grand Coulee permanently blocked anadromous fish from traveling upriver, ending salmon and steelhead migration in the upper Columbia River Basin. As with the flooding of Priest Rapids, Celilo Falls, and Cascades Rapids downriver, the loss of Kettle Falls ended the traditional way of life for the native cultures that revolved around salmon fishing. Many native people moved out of the area, but others live today on the nearby Spokane and Colville Indian Reservations. The Confederated Tribes of the Colville Reservation filed a lawsuit against the United States government, which was settled in 1994 for $53 million, plus $15.25 million annually from 1996 onward.

=== The Third Powerhouse ===
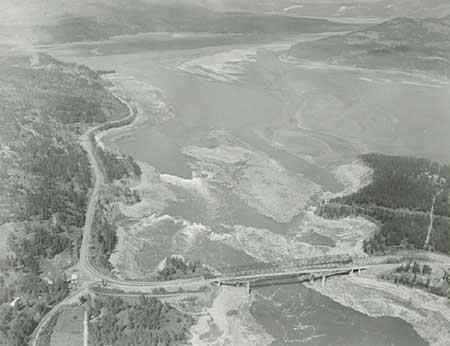
Aerial view of Kettle Falls, partially exposed during drawdown in April 1969.

During the late 1960s and early 1970s Grand Coulee Dam was expanded to include a new group of generators, commonly known as the Third Powerhouse. During the spring months of this period of construction Lake Roosevelt was drastically lowered (referred to as a drawdown). The largest of these drawdowns occurred during the spring of 1969 and 1974 partially exposing Kettle Falls. In addition to exposing the falls these drawdowns also allowed the Lake Roosevelt National Recreation Area and the United States Bureau of Reclamation to undergo a major archaeological salvage program of Native American and historical sites previously flooded by Lake Roosevelt.

== See also ==
- List of waterfalls
- List of waterfalls by flow rate
- List of rapids of the Columbia River
- Celilo Falls
- Cascades Rapids
- Bridge River Rapids
