= List of Indian reserves in British Columbia =

The Government of Canada has established a large number of reserves for more than 200 First Nation band governments in its westernmost province of British Columbia. As of 2019, there were approximately 1,583 reserves in the province associated with 203 Indigenous Nations (or First Nations). While the majority of these reserves continue to exist, some parcels have been historically designated as 'no longer in existence,' often due to government actions like the 'cut-offs' implemented by commissions such as the McKenna-McBride Commission.

Name	Government/band	Tribal council	Ethnic or national group	Communities/location	Comments	Population (2016)
Ahahswinis 1	Hupacasath First Nation	Nuu-chah-nulth Tribal Council	Nuu-chah-nulth	Port Alberni		119
Ahaminaquus 12	Mowachaht/Muchalaht First Nations	Nuu-chah-nulth Tribal Council	Nuu-chah-nulth	Gold River	Full list of Mowachath/Muchalaht reserves	0
Ahous 16	Ahousaht First Nation	Nuu-chah-nulth Tribal Council	Nuu-chah-nulth	Vargas Island, Clayoquot Sound	Full list of Ahousaht First Nation reserves	622
Aitchelitch 9	Aitchelitz First Nation	Sto:lo Nation	Sto:lo	Chilliwack	Full list of Aitchelitz reserves	15
Alert Bay 1	Namgis First Nation	Musgamagw Tsawataineuk Tribal Council	'Namgis (Kwakwaka'wakw)	Alert Bay		213
Alert Bay 1A	Namgis First Nation	Musgamagw Tsawataineuk Tribal Council	'Namgis (Kwakwaka'wakw)	Alert Bay	see 'Yalis / Full list of Namgis reserves	252
Alexandria 1	Alexandria First Nation	Tsilhqot'in National Government	Tsilhqot'in	Alexandria (S of Quesnel)	Full list of Alexandria reserves	15
Alexandria 1A	Alexandria First Nation	Tsilhqot'in National Government	Tsilhqot'in	Alexandria (S of Quesnel)	Full list of Alexandria reserves	0
Alexandria 3	Alexandria First Nation	Tsilhqot'in National Government	Tsilhqot'in	Alexandria (S of Quesnel)	Full list of Alexandria reserves	15
Alexandria 3A	Alexandria First Nation	Tsilhqot'in National Government	Tsilhqot'in	Alexandria (S of Quesnel)	Full list of Alexandria reserves	5
Alexis 9	Lower Similkameen Indian Band	Okanagan Nation Alliance	Syilx	4 miles west of Keremeos	Full list of Lower Similkameen reserves	10
Alkali Lake 1	Alkali Lake Indian Band (Esketemc First Nation)	N/A	Secwepemc	Alkali Lake	Full list of Esketemc reserves	328
Alkali Lake 4A	Alkali Lake Indian Band (Esketemc First Nation)	N/A	Secwepemc	Alkali Lake	Full list of Esketemc reserves	10
Alkhili 2	Taku River Tlingit	Daak Ka Tlingit Nation	Inland Tlingit	2 miles E of Fourth of July Bay, Atlin Lake, 3 miles NE of Atlin	Complete list of Taku River Tlingit reserves	No Data
Anacla 12	Huu-ay-aht First Nations	Nuu-chah-nulth Tribal Council	Nuu-chah-nulth	Pacheena River, Barkley Sound	HQ at Bamfield / Full list of Huu-ay-aht reserves	82
Anahim's Flat 1	Tl'etinqox-t'in Government Office (Anaham Reserve First Nations)	Tsilhqot'in National Government	Tsilhqot'in	Alexis Creek, Chilcotin District	Indian and Northern Affairs Canada - Full list of Tl'etinqox-t'in reserves	342
Anahim's Meadow	Tl'etinqox-t'in Government Office (Anaham Reserve First Nations)	Tsilhqot'in National Government	Tsilhqot'in	Alexis Creek, Chilcotin District	Indian and Northern Affairs Canada - Full list of Tl'etinqox-t'in reserves	10
Anahim's Meadow 2A	Tl'etinqox-t'in Government Office (Anaham Reserve First Nations)	Tsilhqot'in National Government	Tsilhqot'in	Alexis Creek, Chilcotin District	Indian and Northern Affairs Canada - Full list of Tl'etinqox-t'in reserves	0
Ashnola 10	Lower Similkameen Indian Band	Okanagan Nation Alliance	Syilx	Ashnola	Full list of Lower Similkameen Indian Band reserves	83
Ashcroft 4	Ashcroft Indian Band	Nlaka'pamux Nation Tribal Council & Fraser Canyon Indian Administration	Nlaka'pamux	Ashcroft		68
Apsagayu 1A	Mamalilikulla-Qwe'Qwa'Sot'Em First Nation	Kwakiutl District Council	Kwakwaka'wakw	Shoal Harbour, Gilford Island	Complete list of Mamalilikulla-Qwe'Qwa'Sot'Em reserves	No Data
Asahal Lake 2	Williams Lake First Nation	Northern Shuswap Tribal Council	Secwepemc	3 miles N of E end of Willams Lake (the lake)	Complete list of Williams Lake reserves	No Data
Atlin-Teslin Indian Cemetery 4	Taku River Tlingit	Daak Ka Tlingit Nation	Inland Tlingit	E shore Atlin Lake, 1 mile S of Atlin	Complete list of Taku River Tlingit reserves	No Data
Aywawwis 15	Union Bar First Nation	N/A	Sto:lo	on the Fraser River, N of the mouth of the Coquihalla River	Complete list of Union Bar reserves	No Data
Bare Island 9	Tsawout First Nation		Coast Salish	whole of Mandarte Island, head of Haro Strait	Complete list of Tsawout reserves	No Data
Becher Bay 1	Beecher Bay First Nation		Coast Salish	near Metchosin/Sooke	Complete list of Beecher Bay reserves	129
Becher Bay 2	Beecher Bay First Nation		Coast Salish	near Metchosin/Sooke	Complete list of Beecher Bay reserves	No Data
Bella Bella 1			Heiltsuk	Waglisla		1,019
Bella Coola 1	Nuxalk Nation		Nuxalk	Bella Coola		807
Blind Creek 6	Lower Similkameen Indian Band	Okanagan Nation Alliance	Syilx	Keremeos	Full list of Lower Similkameen reserves	26
Blind Creek 6A	Lower Similkameen Indian Band	Okanagan Nation Alliance	Syilx	Keremeos	Full list of Lower Similkameen reserves	No Data
Blueberry River 205						197
Bonaparte 3	Bonaparte Indian Band	Shuswap Nation Tribal Council	Secwepemc	Cache Creek	Full list of Bonaparte First Nation reserves	121
Bridge River 1	Bridge River Indian Band	Lillooet Tribal Council	St'at'imc	Lillooet & Moha		241
Burns Lake 18	Burns Lake Indian Band		Wet'suwet'en (Dakelh)	Burns Lake		48
Burrard Inlet 3	Tsleil-waututh First Nation		Coast Salish	North Vancouver	birthplace of Chief Dan George	1,855
Campbell River 11	Campbell River First Nation	Kwakiutl District Council	Weywakum, Laich-kwil-tach (Kwakwaka'wakw)	Campbell River		381
Canim Lake 1	Canim Lake Indian Band		Secwepemc	Canim Lake		228
Canim Lake 2	Canim Lake Indian Band		Secwepemc	Canim Lake		5
Carpenter Mountain 15	Williams Lake First Nation	Northern Shuswap Tribal Council	Secwepemc	near 156 Mile Post on the Old Cariboo Road (N of Williams Lake)	Complete list of Williams Lake reserves	No Data
Cayoosh Creek 1	Cayoose Creek Indian Band (Sek'welwas)	Lillooet Tribal Council	St'at'imc	Lillooet		66
Chawathil 4	Chawathil First Nation	Stó:lō Tribal Council	Sto:lo	Katz (near Hope)	Complete list of Chawathil reserves	186
Cheakamus 11,	Squamish Nation	N/A	Squamish	Squamish/Brackendale	Site of traditional village, Chiyakmesh. Full list of Squamish Nation reserves	57
Cheam 1	Cheam First Nation	Sto:lo Tribal Council	Sto:lo	Rosedale	Complete list of all Cheam reserves	202
Chehalis 5	Chehalis First Nation	N/A	Sts'Ailes	right bank of Harrison River, Chehalis	Complete list of all Chehalis reserves	537
Chehalis 6	Chehalis First Nation	N/A	Sts'Ailes	left bank of Harrison River, Chehalis, opposite Chehalis IR 5	Complete list of all Chehalis reserves	No Data
Chemainus 13	Chemainus First Nation	Naut'sa mawt Tribal Council	Coast Salish	Chemainus		735
Chenahkint 12	Ehattesaht First Nation	Nuu-chah-nulth Tribal Council	Nuu-chah-nulth	on Queens Cove, east shore of Port Eliza	Complete list of Ehattasaht reserves	0
Cheslatta 1	Cheslatta Indian Band		Dakelh	Cheslatta Lake		84
Chilco Lake 1	Xeni Gwetin First Nation	Tsilhqot'in National Government	Tsilhqot'in	Nemaia Valley		5
Chilco Lake 1A	Xeni Gwetin First Nation	Tsilhqot'in National Government	Tsilhqot'in	Nemaia Valley		25
Chilhil 6	Fountain Indian Band	Lillooet Tribal Council	St'at'imc	Fountain Valley/Lillooet Country	Full list of all Xaxli'p (Fountain) reserves	70
Chimney Creek 5	Williams Lake First Nation	Northern Shuswap Tribal Council	Secwepemc	left bank of Frser River at mouth of Chimney Creek	Complete list of Williams Lake reserves	No Data
Chopaka 7 & 8	Lower Similkameen Indian Band	Okanagan Nation Alliance	Syilx	Chopaka (S of Keremeos)	Full list of Lower Similkameen reserves	81
Chuchuwayha 2	Upper Similkameen First Nation	Okanagan Nation Alliance	Okanagan	Hedley	Complete list of Upper Similkameen reserves	58
Chuchuwayha 2C	Upper Similkameen First Nation	Okanagan Nation Alliance	Okanagan	4 miles southwest of Hedley	Complete list of Upper Similkameen reserves	No Data
Coldwater 1	Coldwater Indian Band	Nicola Tribal Association	Scw'exmx (Nlaka'pamux)	Merritt		318
Cole Bay 3	Pauquachin First Nation		Coast Salish	Cole Bay, Saanich Inlet	Complete list of Pauquachin reserves	332
Columbia Lake 3	?Akisq'nuk First Nation (Columbia Lake Indian Band)	Ktunaxa Kinbasket Tribal Council	Ktunaxa	Columbia Lake/Canal Flats	Complete list of ?Akisq'nuk reserves	140
Comox 1	K'ómoks First Nation	Kwakiutl District Council	Comox/Kwakwaka'wakw	Comox		222
Compton Island 6	Mamalilikulla-Qwe'Qwa'Sot'Em First Nation	Kwakiutl District Council	Kwakwaka'wakw	all of Compton Island, between Harbledown and Swanson Islands	Complete list of Mamalilikulla-Qwe'Qwa'Sot'Em reserves	No Data
Coquitlam 1	Kwikwetlem First Nation		Sto:lo	Coquitlam	Complete list of Kwikwetlem reserves	54
Coquitlam 2	Kwikwetlem First Nation		Sto:lo	Coquitlam	Complete list of Kwikwetlem reserves	0
Cowichan Lake 1		Cowichan Tribes	Quw'utsun (Coast Salish)	Cowichan Lake		
Cowichan 1		Cowichan Tribes		Duncan		
Cowishil 1	Uchucklesaht First Nation	Nuu-chah-nulth Tribal Council	Nuu-chah-nulth	Burroughs Point, west entrance of Uchucklesit Harbour, Barkley Sound	Complete list of Uchucklesaht reserves	
Creston 1		Ktunaxa Kinbasket Tribal Council	Ktunaxa	Creston		
Cumshewas 7		Council of the Haida Nation	Haida	Cumshewa		
Dease River 1		Kaska Tribal Council	Kaska Dena	Dease Lake Post		
Deep Creek 2	Soda Creek/Deep Creek Indian Band	Northern Shuswap Tribal Council	Secwepemc			
Dog Creek 1	Canoe Creek/Dog Creek First Nation	Northern Shuswap Tribal Council	Secwepemc	Dog Creek/Gang Ranch		
Doig River 206						
Dolphin Island 1						
Douglas Lake 3	Douglas Lake First Nation	Nicola Tribal Association	Scw'exmx (Nlaka'pamux)	Douglas Lake/Merritt		
Dry Salmon 7	Fountain Indian Band	Lillooet Tribal Council	St'at'imc	Lillooet, at the Bridge River Fishing Grounds	Full list of all Xaxli'p (Fountain) reserves	
East Moberly Lake 169						
East Saanich 2	Tsawout First Nation		Coast Salish	north shore of Saanichton Bay, North Saanich	Complete list of Tsawout reserves	
Ehatis 11	Ehattesaht First Nation	Nuu-chah-nulth Tribal Council	Nuu-chah-nulth	head of Zeballos Arm, Esperanza Inlet	Complete list of Ehattasaht reserves	
Elhlateese 2	Uchucklesaht First Nation	Nuu-chah-nulth Tribal Council	Nuu-chah-nulth	head of Uchucklesit Harbour, Barkley Sound	Complete list of Uchucklesaht reserves	
Enderby 2	Armstrong First Nation	Okanagan Nation Alliance	Okanagan people (Sylix)	Enderby		
Esquimalt 1	Esquimalt First Nation		Coast Salish	Esquimalt		
Finlay Bay 21	McLeod Lake First Nation		Sekani	McLeod Lake		
Fish Lake 7	Fountain Indian Band	Lillooet Tribal Council	St'at'imc	Fountain Valley/Lillooet Country	Full list of all Xaxli'p (Fountain) reserves	
Five Mile 3	Williams Lake First Nation	Northern Shuswap Tribal Council	Secwepemc	4 miles N of 150 Mile House	Complete list of Williams Lake reserves	
Five Mile Point 3	Taku River Tlingit	Daak Ka Tlingit Nation	Inland Tlingit	at Five Mile Point, E shore Atlin Lake, S of Atlin	Complete list of Taku River Tlingit reserves	
Fort George (Shelly) 2			Lheidli T'enneh (Dakelh)	Prince George		
Fort Nelson 2						
Fort Ware 1	Kwadacha First Nation	Kaska Tribal Council		Fort Ware (Kwadacha)		
Fountain 1	Fountain Indian Band	Lillooet Tribal Council	St'at'imc	Fountain/Lillooet	traditional village Cacli'p or Xaxli'p; Full list of all Xaxli'p (Fountain) reserves	
Fountain 1A	Fountain Indian Band	Lillooet Tribal Council	St'at'imc	Fountain/Lillooet	traditional village Cacli'p or Xaxli'p; Full list of all Xaxli'p (Fountain) reserves	
Fountain 1B	Fountain Indian Band	Lillooet Tribal Council	St'at'imc	Fountain/Lillooet	traditional village Cacli'p or Xaxli'p; Full list of all Xaxli'p (Fountain) reserves	
Fountain 1C	Fountain Indian Band	Lillooet Tribal Council	St'at'imc	Fountain/Lillooet	traditional village Cacli'p or Xaxli'p; Full list of all Xaxli'p (Fountain) reserves	
Fountain 1D	Fountain Indian Band	Lillooet Tribal Council	St'at'imc	Fountain/Lillooet	traditional village Cacli'p or Xaxli'p; Full list of all Xaxli'p (Fountain) reserves	
Fountain 2	Fountain Indian Band	Lillooet Tribal Council	St'at'imc	Fountain/Lillooet	traditional village Cacli'p or Xaxli'p; Full list of all Xaxli'p (Fountain) reserves	
Fountain 3	Fountain Indian Band	Lillooet Tribal Council	St'at'imc	Fountain/Lillooet	traditional village Cacli'p or Xaxli'p; Full list of all Xaxli'p (Fountain) reserves	
Fountain 3A	Fountain Indian Band	Lillooet Tribal Council	St'at'imc	Fountain/Lillooet	traditional village Cacli'p or Xaxli'p; Full list of all Xaxli'p (Fountain) reserves	
Fountain 4	Fountain Indian Band	Lillooet Tribal Council	St'at'imc	Fountain Valley/Lillooet Country	Full list of all Xaxli'p (Fountain) reserves	
Fountain 9	Fountain Indian Band	Lillooet Tribal Council	St'at'imc	Fountain/Lillooet	traditional village Cacli'p or Xaxli'p; Full list of all Xaxli'p (Fountain) reserves	
Fountain 10	Fountain Indian Band	Lillooet Tribal Council	St'at'imc	Fountain/Lillooet	traditional village Cacli'p or Xaxli'p; Full list of all Xaxli'p (Fountain) reserves	
Fountain 11	Fountain Indian Band	Lillooet Tribal Council	St'at'imc	Fountain/Lillooet	traditional village Cacli'p or Xaxli'p; Full list of all Xaxli'p (Fountain) reserves	
Fountain 12	Fountain Indian Band	Lillooet Tribal Council	St'at'imc	Fountain Valley/Lillooet Country	Full list of all Xaxli'p (Fountain) reserves	
Fountain Creek 8	Fountain Indian Band	Lillooet Tribal Council	St'at'imc	Fountain Valley/Lillooet Country	Full list of all Xaxli'p (Fountain) reserves	
Fraser Island 6	Beecher Bay First Nation		Coast Salish	near Metchosin/Sooke	Complete list of Beecher Bay reserves	
Fulford Harbour 5	Tsawout First Nation		Coast Salish	Fulford Harbour, Saltspring Island	Complete list of Tsawout reserves	
Gitanmaax 1		Hereditary Chiefs of the Gitxsan	Gitxsan	Hazelton		
Gitanyow 1			Gitxsan			
Gitsegukla 1			Gitxsan	Gitsegucla		
Gitwangak 1			Gitxsan	Kitwanga		
Gitwinksihlkhw 7						
Goldstream 3	Pauquachin First Nation		Coast Salish	mouth of Goldstream River, head of Finlayson Arm (Saanich Inlet)	Complete list of Pauquachin reserves	
Goldstream 13	Tsawout First Nation		Coast Salish	south end of Finlayson Arm, Saanich Inlet, at mouth of Goldstream River	Complete list of Tsawout reserves	
Gordon River 2						
Grass 15	see comments		Sto:lo	3.5 miles SE of Chilliwack	Complete list of bands on this reserve (9 in total)	
Grassy Island 7	Ehattesaht First Nation	Nuu-chah-nulth Tribal Council	Nuu-chah-nulth	Grassy Island, south side of entrance to Kyuquot Sound	Complete list of Ehattasaht reserves	
Greenwood Island 3	Chawathil First Nation	Stó:lō Tribal Council	Sto:lo	(near Hope)	Complete list of Chawathil reserves	
Gwayasdums 1						
Hagwilget 1	Hagwilget Village Council	Hereditary Chiefs of the Wet'suwet'en		Hagwilget		
Halalt 2	Halalt First Nation	Naut'sa mawt Tribal Council	Coast Salish			
Halfway River 168						
Hanatsa 6						
Hatch Point 12	Pauquachin First Nation		Coast Salish	west shore of Saanich Inlet	Complete list of Pauquachin reserves	
Hecate 17	Ehattesaht First Nation	Nuu-chah-nulth Tribal Council	Nuu-chah-nulth	east shore of Esperanza Inlet	Complete list of Ehattasaht reserves	
Hesquis 10A	Ehattesaht First Nation	Nuu-chah-nulth Tribal Council	Nuu-chah-nulth	Graveyard Bay, north shore of Experanza Inlet	Complete list of Ehattasaht reserves	
High Bar 1	High Bar First Nation	N/A	Secwepemc	High Bar (60 km N of Lillooet)		
Hoke Point 10B	Ehattesaht First Nation	Nuu-chah-nulth Tribal Council	Nuu-chah-nulth	W shore of Graveyard Bay, N shore of Experanza Inlet	Complete list of Ehattasaht reserves	
Homalco 9	Homalco First Nation	Naut'sa mawt Tribal Council	Mainland Comox			
Hope Island 1				Hope Island		
Hopetown 10A			Kwakwaka'wakw			
Houpsitas 6						
Inklyuhkinatko 2						
Iskut 6	Iskut First Nation	Tahltan Nation	Tahltan			
Ittatsoo 1						
James Louie 3A	Williams Lake First Nation	Northern Shuswap Tribal Council	Secwepemc	4 miles N of 150 Mile House, adjoining Five Mile IR 3	Complete list of Williams Lake reserves	
Jennings River 8	Taku River Tlingit	Daak Ka Tlingit Nation	Inland Tlingit	E shore Teslin Lake at mouth of Jennings River	Complete list of Taku River Tlingit reserves	
Kahmoose 4	Boothroyd First Nation	Fraser Thompson Indian Services Society	Nlaka'pamux	1.4 mile north of mouth of Jamies Creek onto Fraser River (near Boothroyd (Fraser Canyon))		
Kamloops 1	Kamloops Indian Band	Shuswap Nation Tribal Council	Secwepemc	Kamloops		
Kanaka Bar 1A	Kanaka Bar First Nation	Fraser Canyon Indian Administration	Nlaka'pamux	Kanaka Bar		
Kanaka Bar 2	Kanaka Bar First Nation	Fraser Canyon Indian Administration	Nlaka'pamux	Kanaka Bar		
Katit 1						
Katzie 1	Katzie First Nation		Katzie/Sto:lo	Pitt Meadows		
Kawkawa Lake 16	Union Bar First Nation	N/A	Sto:lo	SE shore of Kawkawa Lake, Hope	Complete list of Union Bar reserves	
Keremeos Forkst 12 & 12A	Lower Similkameen Indian Band	Okanagan Nation Alliance	Syilx	6-7 miles north of Keremeos	Full list of Lower Similkameen reserves	
Kincolith 14	Gingolx	Nisga'a Lisims (non-TC)	Nisga'a	Gingolx		
Kippase 2						
Kispiox 1						
Kitamaat 2	Haisla Nation		Haisla	Kitimat		525
Kitasoo 1	Kitasoo First Nation	Kitasoo/Xai’Xais Nation	Kitasoo/Xai’Xais	Klemtu, British Columbia		
Kitlope Indian Reserve No. 16	Henaksiala or Kitlope or Gitlope group of the Haisla			at the mouth of the Kitlope River, south of Kitimat		
Kitsumkaylum 1			Gitxsan			
Klaklacum 12	Union Bar First Nation	N/A	Sto:lo	on the Fraser River, 3 miles N of Hope	Complete list of Union Bar reserves	
Klitsis 16	Ehattesaht First Nation	Nuu-chah-nulth Tribal Council	Nuu-chah-nulth	east shore of Espinosa Arm, Esperanza Inlet	Complete list of Ehattasaht reserves	
Kluskus 1			Dakelh			
Kootenay 1			Ktunaxa			
Kopchitchin 2						
Kulkaya (Hartley Bay) 4	Gitga'at First Nation	n/a	Gitga'ata (Tsimshian)	Hartley Bay, Wright Sound, North Coast		
Kulkaya (Hartley Bay) 4A		n/a	Gitga'ata (Tsimshian)	Hartley Bay, Wright Sound, North Coast		
Kulspai 6						
Kumcheen 1	Lytton First Nation	N/A	Nlaka'pamux	Lytton	see Camchin	
Kuper Island 7			Penelakut			
Kwawkwawapilt 6	Kwaw-kwaw-Apilt First Nation	Sto:lo Tribal Council	Sto:lo	1 mile SW of Chilliwack	Complete list of Kwaw-kwaw-Apilt reserves	
Lachkaltsap 9						
Lakahahmnen 11	Leq' a: mel First Nation		Sto:lo	Nicomen Island		
Lamb Island 5	Beecher Bay First Nation		Coast Salish	near Metchosin/Sooke	Complete list of Beecher Bay reserves	
Langley 2	Kwantlen First Nation	Sto:lo Tribal Council	Sto:lo	right bank of Stave River, 1 mile N of Fraser River (Ruskin	Complete list of all Kwantlen reserves	
Langley 3	Kwantlen First Nation	Sto:lo Tribal Council	Sto:lo	island a mouth of Stave River at Fraser River (Ruskin	Complete list of all Kwantlen reserves	
Langley 4	Kwantlen First Nation	Sto:lo Tribal Council	Sto:lo	left bank of mouth of Stave River at Fraser River (Ruskin	Complete list of all Kwantlen reserves	
Langley 5	Kwantlen First Nation	Sto:lo Tribal Council	Sto:lo	right (north) bank of Fraser River, 2 miles NE of Fort Langley (Albion	Complete list of all Kwantlen reserves	
Lax Kw'alaams 1			Tsimshian			
Liard River 3						
Lillooet 1	T'it'q'et First Nation (Lillooet Indian Band)	Lillooet Tribal Council	St'at'imc	Lillooet		
Long Neck Island 9	Beecher Bay First Nation		Coast Salish	near Metchosin/Sooke	Complete list of Beecher Bay reserves	
Lower Similkameen 2	Lower Similkameen Indian Band	Okanagan Nation Alliance	Syilx	near Cawston	Full list of Lower Similkameen reserves	
Lulu 5	Upper Similkameen First Nation	Okanagan Nation Alliance	Okanagan	13 miles east of Princeton	Complete list of Upper Similkameen reserves	
Lyacksun 3	Lyackson First Nation	Naut'sa mawt Tribal Council	Coast Salish	Valdes Island (near Chemainus)	Complete list of Lyackson reserves	
McKillan Island 6	Kwantlen First Nation	Sto:lo Tribal Council	Sto:lo	McMillan Island (Fort Langley	Complete list of all Kwantlen reserves	
McDonald Lake 1	Taku River Tlingit	Daak Ka Tlingit Nation	Inland Tlingit	at N end of McDonald Lake, 12 miles NE of Atlin	Complete list of Taku River Tlingit reserves	
Macoah 1						
Malachan 11						
Malahat 11	Malahat First Nation	Naut'sa mawt Tribal Council	Coast Salish	Malahat		
Mahmalillikullah 7	Mamalilikulla-Qwe'Qwa'Sot'Em First Nation	Kwakiutl District Council	Kwakwaka'wakw	west end of Village Island and three islands offshore there	Complete list of Mamalilikulla-Qwe'Qwa'Sot'Em reserves	
Marktosis 15			Nuu-chah-nulth			
Masset 1	Masset Indian Band (Old Masset Village Council)	Haida Nation	Haida	Masset	"Old Masset"	
Matsqui Main 2						
McLeod Lake 1	McLeod Lake First Nation			McLeod Lake		
McMillan Island 6	Kwantlen Nation		Sto:lo	Fort Langley		
Mission 1	Squamish Nation	N/A	Squamish	North Vancouver	see Esla7an	
Mount Currie 6	Mount Currie Indian Band	Lillooet Tribal Council	Lil'wat (St'at'imc)	Mount Currie-Pemberton		
Musqueam 2						
Nak'azdli						
Nanaimo Town 1						
Nanoose Indian Reserve 0	Nanoose First Nation	Naut'sa mawt Tribal Council				
Narcisse's Farm 4	Lower Similkameen Indian Band	Okanagan Nation Alliance	Syilx	near Cawston	Full list of Lower Similkameen reserves	
Nautley (Fort Fraser) 1			Dakelh	Fort Fraser		
Nazco 20	Nazko First Nation		Dakelh	Nazko		
Nequatque 2	N'Quatqua First Nation (Anderson Lake Indian Band)	Lower Stl'atl'imx Tribal Council	St'at'imc	D'Arcy (Anderson Lake)	traditional village N'Quatqua	
Neskonlith 1						
New Aiyansh 1		Nisga'a Lisims (non-TC)	Nisga'a			
New Songhees 1a	Songhees First Nation		Lekwungen/Songish, Coast Salish	Esquimalt (formerly in Victoria)	The original Songhees reserve was on Victoria's Inner Harbour, the land-allotment moved to Esquimalt in recent years	
Shingle Point 4	Lyackson First Nation	Naut'sa mawt Tribal Council	Coast Salish	Valdes Island (near Chemainus)	Complete list of Lyackson reserves	
Nicola Hamlet 1		Nicola Tribal Association				
Nicomen 1						
Nine Mile 4	Upper Similkameen First Nation	Okanagan Nation Alliance	Okanagan	on left bank of the Similkameen River	Complete list of Upper Similkameen reserves	
Nooaitch 10						
North Tacla Lake 7						
North Thompson 1	Simpcw	Shuswap Nation Tribal Council	Secwepemc	Chu Chua, N of Barriere		724
Nuuautin 2						
Oclucje 7						
Ohamil 1			Sto:lo	Chilliwack		
Okanagan 1	Okanagan Indian Band	Okanagan Nation Alliance	Okanagan	Vernon		
Oke 10	Ehattesaht First Nation	Nuu-chah-nulth Tribal Council	Nuu-chah-nulth	between Zeballos and Espinosa Arms, Esperanza Inlet	Complete list of Ehattasaht reserves	
One Mile 6	Upper Similkameen First Nation	Okanagan Nation Alliance	Okanagan	10 miles north of Princeton	Complete list of Upper Similkameen reserves	
Opitsat 1			Nuu-chah-nulth	Opitsaht (Tofino)		
Oregon Jack Creek 3	Oregon Jack Creek Indian Band	Nlaka'pamux Nation Tribal Council	Nlaka'pamux	Ashcroft		
Osoyoos 1	Osoyoos Indian Band	Okanagan Nation Alliance	Okanagan	Osoyoos & Oliver	widely leased for vineyards (40% of all grapes in the Okanagan)	
Palling 1	Wet'suwet'en First Nation (Broman Lake Band)	Hereditary Chiefs of the Wet'suwet'en (non-TC)				
Papsilqua 13	Shackan First Nation	Nicola Tribal Association	Sxe'xn'x (Nlaka'pamux)	on banks of Papsilaqu and Skuhun Creeks, in lower Nicola River valley SE of Spences Bridge	Complete list of Shackan reserves	
Pavilion 1	Pavilion Indian Band (Ts'kwaylaxw First Nation)	Lillooet Tribal Council/Shuswap Nation Tribal Council	St'at'imc & Secwepemc	Pavilion, British Columbia		
Pekw'Xwe:yles (Peckquaylis)	see comments		Sto:lo/Sts'Ailes	Hatzic/Mission	Complete list of bands on this reserve (21 in total); formerly St. Mary's Indian Residential School	
Pender Island 8	Tsawout First Nation		Coast Salish	Hay Point, west side of South Pender Island	Complete list of Tsawout reserves	
Penticton 1	Penticton Indian Band	Okanagan Nation Alliance	Okanagan	Penticton		
Peters 1	Peters Indian Band		Sto:lo	on left bank of Fraser River, 2.5 miles downstream from Laidlaw (near Hope)	Complete list of Peters reserves	
Peters 1A	Peters Indian Band		Sto:lo	on left bank of Fraser River, opposite the north end of Sea Bird Island	Complete list of Peters reserves	
Peters 2	Peters Indian Band		Sto:lo	west half of Wadsworth Island in the Fraser River, just NE of Sea Bird Island (near Ruby Creek	Complete list of Peters reserves	
Popkum 1	Popkum First Nation	Sto:lo Nation	Sto:lo	Popkum	Complete list of Popkum reserves	
Popkum 2	Popkum First Nation	Sto:lo Nation	Sto:lo	Popkum	Complete list of Popkum reserves	
Portier Pass 5	Lyackson First Nation	Naut'sa mawt Tribal Council	Coast Salish	Valdes Island (near Chemainus)	Complete list of Lyackson reserves	
Prophet River 4	Prophet River First Nation		Treaty 8 Tribal Association	Mile Post 234, Prophet River Settlement (Fort Nelson region)	sole reserve of this First Nation	
Puckatholetchin 11	Union Bar First Nation	N/A	Sto:lo	right bank of Fraser River, 4 miles north of Hope	Complete list of Union Bar reserves	
Quaaout 1						
Quaee 7						
Qualicum	Qualicum First Nation			Qualicum		
Quatlenemo 5	Fountain Indian Band	Lillooet Tribal Council	St'at'imc	Fountain Valley/Lillooet Country	Full list of all Xaxli'p (Fountain) reserves	
Quatsino Subdivision 18	Quatsino First Nation	Kwakiutl District Council	Kwakwaka'wakw	Quatsino Sound		
Quesnel 1						
Quinsam 12	Campbell River Indian Band	Kwakiutl District Council	Weywakum Laich-kwil-tach (Kwakwaka'wakw)	Campbell River		
Range 13	Lower Similkameen Indian Band	Okanagan Nation Alliance	Syilx	near Cawston	Full list of Lower Similkameen reserves	
Redstone Flat 1		Tsilhqot'in National Government	Tsi Del Del (Tsilhqot'in00)	Redstone (Hanceville)		
Refuge Cove 6						
Ruby Creek 2	Ruby Creek First Nation		Sto:lo	Agassiz		
Tatchu 13	Ehattesaht First Nation	Nuu-chah-nulth Tribal Council	Nuu-chah-nulth	on Tatchu Point, west entrance to Esperanza Inlet	Complete list of Ehattasaht reserves	
Tatchu 13A	Ehattesaht First Nation	Nuu-chah-nulth Tribal Council	Nuu-chah-nulth	on Tatchu Point, west entrance to Esperanza Inlet	Complete list of Ehattasaht reserves	
S1/2 Tsimpsean 2			Tsimshian			
Saaiyouck 6						
Sachteen 2						
Sahhaltkum 4						
St. Mary's 1A	see comments	Shuswap Nation Tribal Council/Ktunaxa Kinbasket Tribal Council	Secwepemc	at St. Eugene Mission, 6 miles north of Cranbrook	Complete list of First Nations on this reserve	
San Jose 6	Williams Lake First Nation	Northern Shuswap Tribal Council	Secwepemc	at west end (outlet) of Williams Lake (the lake)	Complete list of Williams Lake reserves	
Saturna Island 7	Tsawout First Nation		Coast Salish	east point of Saturna Island at entrance to Strait of Georgia	Complete list of Tsawout reserves	
Schelowat 1	Skwah First Nation		Sto:lo	5 miles east of Chilliwack	Complete list of all Skwah reserves	
Schkam 2	Chawathil First Nation	Stó:lō Tribal Council	Sto:lo	Haig (near Hope)	Complete list of Chawathil reserves	
Seabird Island	Seabird Island First Nation		Sto:lo	Agassiz		
Sechelt Band Lands (Sechelt) 2					see Sechelt Indian Band	
Semiahmoo Indian Reserve	Semiahmoo First Nation	N/A	Semiahmoo people	White Rock		
Shackan 11	Shackan First Nation	Nicola Tribal Association	Sxe'xn'x (Nlaka'pamux)	on Nicola River 12 miles from confluence with the Thompson	Complete list of Shackan reserves	
Shingle Point 4	Lyackson First Nation	Naut'sa mawt Tribal Council	Coast Salish	Valdes Island (near Chemainus)	Complete list of Lyackson reserves	
Shuswap Indian Reserve	Shuswap Indian Band	Shuswap Nation Tribal Council/Ktunaxa Kinbasket Tribal Council	Secwepemc	Invermere	Complete list of Shuswap Indian Band reserves (2 only)	
Sik-e-dakh 2						
Silver Salmon Lake 7	Taku River Tlingit	Daak Ka Tlingit Nation	Inland Tlingit	on Silver Salmon River at east end of Kuthai Lake, E of S end of Atlin Lake	Complete list of Taku River Tlingit reserves	
Sim Creek 5						
Siska Flat 3	Siska Indian Band		Nlaka'pamux	Siska		
Skahwalum 10	Union Bar First Nation	N/A	Sto:lo	on the right bank of the Fraser River, 5 miles N of Hope	Complete list of Union Bar reserves	
Skedans 8	[	Council of the Haida Nation	Haida	Skedans		
Skeetchestn						
Skidegate 1	Skidegate First Nation	Haida Nation	Haida	Skidegate		
Skins Lake 16a						
Skookumchuck 4	Skatin First Nation	In-SHUCK-ch Nation/Lower Stl'atl'imx Tribal Council	Stl'atl'imx	Skookumchuck Hot Springs		
Skowkale 10	Skowkale First Nation		Sto:lo	Chilliwack		
Skumalasph 16	Skwah First Nation		Sto:lo	6 miles NW of Chilliwack	Complete list of all bands on this reserve (5 in total)	
Skwah 4	Skwah First Nation	N/A	Sto:lo	west of and adjoining Chilliwack	Complete list of all Skwah reserves	
Skwahla 2	Skwah First Nation	N/A	Sto:lo	1 mile NE of Chilliwack	Complete list of all Skwah reserves	
Skwali 3	Skwah First Nation	N/A	Sto:lo	NW of and at Chilliwack	Complete list of all Skwah reserves	
Skway 5	Skway First Nation		Sto:lo	2 miles NW of Chilliwack	Complete list of Skway reserves	
Sliammon 1	Sliammon First Nation		Mainland Comox	Powell River		
Slosh 1	Seton Lake Indian Band	Lillooet Tribal Council	St'at'imc	Shalalth		
Soldatquo 5	Shackan First Nation	Nicola Tribal Association	Sxe'xn'x (Nlaka'pamux)	3 miles NE of Clapperton (near Nicola Lake	Complete list of Shackan reserves	
Soowahlie 14			Sto:lo			
South Saanich 1						
Spuzzum 1	Spuzzum First Nation	Fraser Canyon Indian Administration	Nlaka'pamux	Spuzzum		
Squawkum Creek 3						
Squiaala 7						
Squinas 2						
Stellaquo (Stella) 1	Stellat'en First Nation					
Stone 1		Tsilhqot'in National Government	Tsilhqot'in			
Stony Creek 1						
Swahliseah 14	Union Bar First Nation	N/A	Sto:lo	on the Fraser River, 1/2 M south of CN Trafalgar Stn (N of Hope)	Complete list of Union Bar reserves	
Tache 1			Dakelh			
Taku 6	Taku River Tlingit	Daak Ka Tlingit Nation	Inland Tlingit	at jct of Silver Salmon and Nakina Rivers, E of S end of Atlin Lake	Complete list of Taku River Tlingit reserves	
Telegraph Creek 6	Tahltan First Nation	Tahltan Nation	Tahltan	Telegraph Creek		
Teslin Lake 7	Taku River Tlingit	Daak Ka Tlingit Nation	Inland Tlingit	at S end of Teslin Lake, west shore, north of Hudson's Bay Post	Complete list of Taku River Tlingit reserves	
Teslin Lake 9	Taku River Tlingit	Daak Ka Tlingit Nation	Inland Tlingit	on W shore of Teslin Lake, at mouth of Gladys River	Complete list of Taku River Tlingit reserves	
Tillion 4	Williams Lake First Nation	Northern Shuswap Tribal Council	Secwepemc	left bank of Frser River at mouth of Williams Lake River	Complete list of Williams Lake reserves	
Tipella 7	Douglas Indian Band	In-SHUCK-ch Nation/Lower Stl'atl'imx Tribal Council/Sto:lo Nation	Stl'atl'imx	Port Douglas		
Tobacco Plains 2	Tobacco Plains First Nation	Ktunaxa Kinbasket Tribal Council	Ktunaxa	Roosvile (nr Cranbrook)		
Toosey 1	Toosey First Nation	Tsilhqot'in National Government	Tsilhqot'in			
Tork 7	Klahoose First Nation	Naut'sa mawt Tribal Council	Comox (Coast Salish)	E shore of Squirrel Cove, Cortes Island		
Trafalgar Flat 13	Union Bar First Nation	N/A	Sto:lo	left bank of the Fraser River, 2.5 miles N of Hope	Complete list of Union Bar reserves	
Tsahaheh 1	Tseshaht First Nation	Nuu-chah-nulth Tribal Council	Nuu-chah-nulth	Alberni Valley (Somass River)	Complete list of Tseshaht Indian Reserves	
Tsawwassen Indian Reserve	Tsawwassen First Nation	Naut'sa mawt Tribal Council	Coast Salish	Tsawwassen (Delta)	extinguished April 3, 2009 by consequence of the Tsawwassen Treaty	
Tseatah 2	Cheam First Nation	Sto:lo Tribal Council	Sto:lo	2 miles S of Agassiz (Rosedale)	Complete list of all Cheam reserves	
Tsinstikeptum 9	Westbank First Nation	Okanagan Nation Alliance	Okanagan	West Kelowna	6 miles SW of Kelowna on opposite side of Okanagan Lake	
Tsinstikeptum 10	Westbank First Nation	Okanagan Nation Alliance	Okanagan	West Kelowna	Commonly referred to as the Westbank Indian Reserve, located immediately opposite Kelowna, across Okanagan Lake	
T'sou-ke Indian Reserve 1	T'sou-ke First Nation	Naut'sa mawt Tribal Council	Coast Salish	Sooke	formerly the Sooke Indian Reserve No. 1, name changed on April 16, 1998, to match name-change of former Sooke First Nation to current	
Tsulquate 4	Gwa'Sala-'Nakwaxda'xw First Nation	Kwakiutl District Council	Kwakwaka'wakw	W shore Hardy Bay, 1 miles N of Port Hardy	Complete list of Gwa'Sala-Nakwaxda'xw reserves	
Twin Island 10	Beecher Bay First Nation		Coast Salish	near Metchosin/Sooke	Complete list of Beecher Bay reserves	
Tunnel 6	Chawathil First Nation	Stó:lō Tribal Council	Sto:lo	near Yale)	Complete list of Chawathil reserves	
Tzeachten 13			Sto:lo			
Uncha Lake 13a						
Union Bay 4			Coast Salish	Union Bay		
Unnamed 10	Taku River Tlingit	Daak Ka Tlingit Nation	Inland Tlingit	Atlin	Complete list of Taku River Tlingit reserves	
Upper Sumas 6	Sumas First Nation		Sto:lo	Kilgard (Abbotsford)	see Louie Sam	
Vermilion Forks 1	Upper Similkameen First Nation	Okanagan Nation Alliance	Okanagan	Princeton	Complete list of Upper Similkameen reserves	
Village Island 7	Beecher Bay First Nation		Coast Salish	near Metchosin/Sooke	Complete list of Beecher Bay reserves	
West Moberly Lake 168a						
Whale Island 8	Beecher Bay First Nation		Coast Salish	near Metchosin/Sooke	Complete list of Beecher Bay reserves	
Whispering Pines 4	Whispering Pines First Nation	Shuswap Nation Tribal Council	Secwepemc	Clinton		
Whonnock 1	Kwantlen First Nation	Sto:lo Tribal Council	Sto:lo	1 mile E of Whonnock	Complete list of all Kwantlen reserves	
Williams Lake 1	Williams Lake Indian Band	Northern Shuswap Tribal Council	Secwepemc	Williams Lake	aka "Sugarcane Reserve"	
Witset	Witset First Nation	Hereditary Chiefs of the Wet'suwet'en (non-TC)	Wet'suwet'en	Witset, British Columbia		
Wolf Creek 3	Upper Similkameen First Nation	Okanagan Nation Alliance	Okanagan	9 miles east of Princeton	Complete list of Upper Similkameen reserves	
Woyenne 27			Dakelh			
Yakweakwio0se 12	Yakweakwioose First Nation	Sto:lo Nation	Sto:lo	south of Chilliwack	Complete list of Yakweawioose reserves	
Yale Town 1	Yale First Nation		Sto:lo	Yale		
Ye Koo Che 3	Yekooche First Nation		Dakelh			

== See also ==
- List of First Nations in British Columbia
- List of Indian reserves in Canada
