= Wap Creek Provincial Park =

Provincial park in British Columbia, Canada

- Type: Provincial Park
- Location: British Columbia, Canada
- Coordinates: 50.73467055359495°N 118.58500594110595°W
- Area: 328 hectares (810 acres)
- Website: https://bcparks.ca/wap-creek-park/

Wap Creek Provincial Park is a provincial park located in British Columbia, Canada, on the north end of Mabel Lake. Established as a Class A Park on June 27, 2008, the park covers an area of approximately 382 hectares (810 acres).

== Flora and fauna ==
The park is home to a variety of species endemic to Canada. The park contains an old growth black cottonwood ecosystem, for instance. Bears, moose, and salmon can also be found in the area.

== Indigenous peoples ==
Several First Nations groups in Canada are involved in stewardship of the park, including the Okanagan Nation Alliance, Okanagan Indian Band, the Lower Similkameen Indian Band, and the Secwepemc.
