= Sea Bird Island =

Sea Bird Island:

- Alternate name for Yerba Buena Island in San Francisco Bay
- Sea Bird Island (British Columbia), home of the Seabird Island First Nation
