= Fountain Lakes =

Fountain Lakes may refer to:

- Fountain Valley (British Columbia), also known as the Fountain Lakes Valley or Three Lakes Valley, a valley and associated rural community near Lillooet, British Columbia, Canada
- the fictional community of Fountain Lakes in the Australian television series Kath & Kim.
