= Seabird Island =

Seabird Island may refer to

- Sea Bird Island (British Columbia), until 1976 was named "Seabird Island"
  - Seabird Island First Nation
  - Seabird Indian Reserve No. 1, on Sea Bird Island and under the administration of the Seabird First Nation
- Yerba Buena Island
