= Roger Adolph =

Canadian boxer

Chief Roger Adolph (born 1942) is a former boxer and former St'at'imc chief of the Xaxli'p (Fountain) Reserve in British Columbia. He was born to Lawerence and Maggie Adolph, who were both elders of the fountain band and had first hand experience in the fountain area.

== Career ==
Adolph was first introduced to boxing at Williams Lake Residential School. Adolph initially chose to play basketball, but his involvement in a fight during a basketball game led to an opportunity with the boxing team. Once in high school, he trained for three years before he made the Kamloops Residential School boxing team. There he caught the eye of volunteer trainer Jackie Cripps, a Vancouver boxer. Though the boxing team coach felt Adolph had little promise as a boxer, Cripps thought differently. He watched Adolph improve under his coaching and suggested that he seek out trainer Bert Lowes and the South Hill Boxing Club in Vancouver. Eager to prove his coach wrong, Adolph moved to Vancouver to further his boxing career.

While in Vancouver, Adolph pursued various trades and continued boxing, where he had opportunities to hone his skills against both Canadian and U.S. boxers. In 1961 he competed in the Seattle Golden Gloves and had a strong match against the reigning U.S. champion. He also competed in the Canadian Championships in Drayton Valley, Alberta. By 1963 he had joined the Prince George Boxing Club. In the same year he won the Canadian Bantamweight Championship in Weyburn, Saskatchewan, where he met future coach and friend Elio Ius.

Adolph qualified for the 1963 Pan-American Games in São Paulo, Brazil, but a week before he was to leave, he found out that he would not be going. Though the Canadian Amateur Boxing Association provided reasons for their decision, Adolph later learned that racism against Native people had influenced them.

Angry and discouraged, he gave up boxing and returned to Fountain, his home reserve. But with elder Sam Mitchell's support, his love for boxing eventually overcame his anger and he returned to Prince George six months later. After winning the Golden Gloves in Tacoma in 1964 he began to work with Elio Ius at the Northwest Eagles Club in Vancouver. In 1966 he won the Golden Gloves in Vancouver, Seattle and Tacoma and competed at the U.S. Nationals in North Carolina. Fearing that Adolph would either box for the United States or turn to professional boxing, the Canadian Amateur Boxing Association offered him a place on Canadian Team competing in the upcoming Pan-American Games. Instead Adolph signed a contract to box professionally under the management of Bobby Neil in London, England. He completed in England for the next 2 1/2 years.

During Adolph's his career he went 10 bouts and 45 rounds in the featherweight division.

== Retirement ==
In 1968, Adolph retired from boxing and returned to Canada. In 1982 Adolph was appointed Chief of the Fountain Band, a position he held until 2006.

In 2008, Adolph and some of his colleagues started the "Just Do It Sport Society" to promote healthy choices leadership and development. The decision to start the society was a result of the decline in sport activity for both aboriginal and non-aboriginal youth over the past decade.

== Awards and recognition ==
In 2012, Roger Adolph was inducted into the British Columbia Amateur Boxing Hall of Fame in recognition of his accomplishments.
