= Methow people =

Native American tribe from Washington State, U.S.

Methow
Buttlemuleemauch

Regions with significant populations
- United States (Washington)

Languages
- English, Salishan, Interior Salish

Related ethnic groups
- Colville, Sanpoil, Nespelem, Palus, Wenatchi, Entiat, Sinixt, Southern Okanagan, Sinkiuse-Columbia, and the Nez Perce of Chief Joseph's band

The Methow (/ˈmɛthaʊ/ MET-how) are a Native American tribe that lived along the Methow River, a tributary of the Columbia River in northern Washington. They are an Interior Salish people and an Indigenous people of the Plateau. Today, Methow people are enrolled in the Confederated Tribes of the Colville Reservation, a federally recognized tribe.

The Methow were a relatively small tribe, with an estimated population of 800 in 1780 and 300 in 1870.

== Name ==
The river's English name is taken from that of the tribe. The name "Methow" comes from the Okanagan placename /mətxʷú/, meaning "sunflower (seeds)". The tribe's name for the river was Buttlemuleemauch, meaning "salmon falls river".

== Language ==
Their endangered language, known as Colville-Okanagan, spoken only by older adults, is a part of the Southern Interior Salish linguistic branch. The Methow now speak English.
