= Okanagan language =

Endangered Salish language of North America

Colville-Okanagan
- Okanagan, Colville
- n̓səl̓xčin̓, Nsyilxcən, n̓syil̓xčn̓
- Native to: Canada, United States
- Region: Southern Interior of British Columbia, Central-northern State of Washington
- Ethnicity: Okanagan, Colville, Lakes, Methow
- Native speakers: 240 in Canada (2021 census)
- Language family: Salishan: Interior Salish; Southern; Colville-Okanagan
- Dialects: Northern Okanagan; Colville (n̓x̌ʷʔiłpcən); Lakes/Sinixt dialect (snslxcin); San-poil (Nespelem); Southern Okanagan; Methow

Language codes
- ISO 639-3: oka
- Glottolog: okan1243
- ELP: Nsyilxcən
- Okanagan is classified as Definitely Endangered by the UNESCO Atlas of the World's Languages in Danger.

Okanagan, Colville-Okanagan, or Nsyilxcən (n̓səl̓xcin̓ or n̓syilxčn̓) is a Salish language that originated among the Indigenous peoples of the southern Interior Plateau. It was primarily spoken in the Okanagan and Columbia River basins of present-day Canada and the United States in the precolonial era. Following British, American, and Canadian colonization during the 19th century and the subsequent forced assimilation of Salishan peoples, the use of the language declined significantly.

Colville-Okanagan is considered extremely endangered. Approximately 50 fluent first language speakers remain, the majority of whom reside in British Columbia. The language is currently classified as moribund, with no first language speakers under the age of 50. Despite this, Colville-Okanagan remains the second-most spoken Salish language after Shuswap. Although it is rarely acquired as a first language, it is currently being learned as a second language by more than 40 adults and 35 children in Spokane, Washington, as well as by dozens of adults on the Colville Indian Reservation and within the Okanagan Valley of British Columbia.

== History and description ==
Colville-Okanagan descended from Proto Southern Interior Salish, a language originally spoken in the Columbia River Basin. Prior to European contact, the language had developed into three distinct dialects: Colville, Okanagan, and Lakes. These dialects exhibit a low degree of divergence, with variations primarily limited to minor differences in pronunciation rather than significant shifts in vocabulary or grammar.

The vast majority of the Colville-Okanagan lexicon is derived from Proto-Salish or Proto-Interior Salish. Some vocabulary is shared with or borrowed from neighboring Salish, Sahaptian, and Kutenai languages, while more recent loanwords have been adopted from English and French. Colville-Okanagan remained an exclusively oral language until the late 19th century, when missionaries and linguists began transcribing it to produce word lists, dictionaries, and grammars. Today, the language is written in Latin script using the American Phonetic Alphabet.

In the native tongue, the language is referred to as n̓səl̓xčin̓ or nsyilxcn. Historically, speakers occupied the northern Columbia Basin, ranging from the Methow River in the west to Kootenay Lake in the east, and extending north along the Columbia River, the Arrow Lakes, and the Slocan Valley. All nsyilxcn-speaking bands are grouped under the ethnonym syil̓x. This term is cognate of the Spokane-Kalispel word séliš, which is the ethnonym for the Bitterroot Salish of Montana.

Colville-Okanagan is the heritage language of several groups, including:

- British Columbia: The Westbank First Nation, Lower Similkameen, Upper Similkameen, Osoyoos, Penticton, Okanagan, and Upper Nicola Indian bands.
- Washington State: The Colville, Sanpoil, Okanogan, Lakes, Nespelem, and Methow bands of the Confederated Tribes of the Colville Reservation.

Words in the language are traditionally not capitalized. This practice reflects Colville-Okanagan ethics; as noted by practitioners, capitalization can imply a hierarchy of importance that contradicts the egalitarian values of their society.

== Revitalization ==
In 2012, CBC reported on a family teaching Okanagan to their children at home. Seven nonprofit organizations currently support Okanagan language acquisition and revitalization:

- Paul Creek Language Association: Keremeos, British Columbia
- Syilx Language House: Penticton, British Columbia
- En'owkin Centre: Penticton, British Columbia
- Osoyoos Indian Band Language House: Oliver, British Columbia
- Hearts Gathered Waterfall Montessori: Omak, Washington
- Salish School of Spokane: Spokane, Washington
- Inchelium Language and Culture Association: Inchelium, Washington

=== Revitalization in the United States ===
Revitalization efforts in the United States include early childhood instruction and intensive adult speaker training. The Concentrated Tribes of the Colville Reservation actively promote preservation by allocating local and federal funds for cultural projects. The Tribes' primary objectives include establishing three language programs, developing comprehensive dictionaries, providing translation services, and maintaining regular language classes with 30 or more consistent participants.

==== Salish School of Spokane ====
The Salish School of Spokane (SSOS) (sƛ̓x̌atkʷ nsəl̓xčin̓ sn̓maʔmáyaʔtn̓) implements a comprehensive community revitalization strategy serving the Spokane metropolitan area. The school provides Okanagan immersion education for students ranging from one year old through the 9th grade. In classrooms for grades P-8, instruction is conducted entirely in Okanagan, covering core subjects such as mathematics, literacy, science, art, music and physical education. The curriculum is designed to foster full fluency by age 15, and students are expected to use the language exclusively while on campus. As of 2022, the school also provides intensive training for over 40 adults.

Twenty-eight staff members at SSOS are enrolled in the Salish Language Educator Development (SLED) program at SSOS. These staff members receive 90 minutes of immersion training daily as part of their work. Another 16 adults, parents of SSOS students, participate in paid afternoon and evening fluency track training. All SSOS parents commit to completing at least 60 hours of Okanagan language classes per year in order for their children to be eligible to attend the school. SSOS offers free, beginning language classes on evenings and weekends for SSOS parents and other community members. At Salish School of Spokane, there are 35 intergenerational pairs: 35 immersion school students who have at least one parent who is studying Okanagan in a fluency-track program.

Salish School of Spokane aims to increase the availability of educational material by maintaining a variety of audio resources and curricula to advance Okanagan revitalization. Along with these efforts, the school provides, develops and translates curricula. The Salish School works alongside organizations such as the Paul Creek Language Association, a nonprofit based in British Columbia, on the N̓səl̓xcin̓ Curriculum Project. The N̓səl̓xcin̓ Project aims to create foundational lesson plans from which language teachers can draw. The project is spearheaded by Christopher Parkin, and is translated primarily by the elder Sarah Peterson, with the additional help of Hazel Abrahamson and Herman Edwards.

=== Revitalization in Canada ===
The Certificate of Indigenous Language Revitalization is offered by the En'owkin Centre in partnership with the University of Victoria, taught by linguist Maxine Baptiste. Additionally, the Centre offers a certification to become a Certified Early Childhood Education Assistant in partnership with Nicola Valley Institute of Technology. The certificate does not qualify one to teach at the secondary level, but does ensure employability in daycare and pre-K. These certificates aim to give potential teachers easy access to college credits from centers of higher learning like the University of Victoria, and potential education assistants can be involved in childhood education, thus establishing fluency in Okanagan early on.

The En'owkin Centre also emphasizes its college readiness programs; many native students perform poorly in school and the high school dropout rate for Indigenous high schoolers is very high.

Additionally, a "language house" was developed in 2015 in British Columbia aiming to create 10 fluent Okanagan speakers in four years. In this program, participants spend 2000 hours over four years learning nsyilxcen via a variety of different teaching methods, regular assessments, frequent visits from Elders, and full immersion. Following completion of the program in 2020, the Syilx Language House intended to expand by developing more language houses across the Okanagan, increasing its goal to creating 100 new nsyilxcn speakers in the 2020 cohort.

==== UBCO Bachelor of Nsyilxcn Language Fluency ====
In 2011, the BC Indigenous Adult and Higher Learning Association, in collaboration with the Nicola Valley Institute of Technology and En'owkin Centre, initiated a new bachelor's degree program – the Bachelor of Nsyilxcn Language Fluency (BNLF) – offered through the University of British Columbia Okanagan to support Okanagan language learning and create new fluent speakers. The program has been led by associate professor Jeannette Armstrong since its inception. The BNLF was the first bachelor's degree of Indigenous language fluency offered in Canada and was developed as a model that could be duplicated across British Columbia.

The Bachelor of Nsyilxcn Language Fluency is a four-year program. During the first two years, students complete an Indigenous language diploma. During the third and fourth year of the program, students are assigned a capstone project at UBCO where they work in the community to promote language learning.

The first cohort of eight students graduated with a Bachelor's of Nsyilxcn Language Fluency in 2023. An additional 12 students were expected to graduate the following year, with around 100 students working towards graduation at the time.

== Phonology ==
=== Consonants ===
Consonant inventory of Okanagan is as follows:

		Bilabial	Alveolar			Palatal	Velar		Uvular/ Pharyngeal		Glottal
		Bilabial	plain	lat.	sib.	Palatal	plain	labial	plain	labial	Glottal
Stop	tenuis	p ⟨p⟩	t ⟨t⟩		ts ~ tʃ ⟨c/č⟩		k ⟨k⟩	kʷ ⟨kʷ⟩	q ⟨q⟩	qʷ ⟨qʷ⟩	ʔ ⟨ʔ⟩
Stop	ejective	pʼ ⟨p̓⟩	tʼ ⟨t̓⟩	tɬʼ ⟨ƛ̓⟩	tsʼ ⟨c̓⟩		kʼ ⟨k̓⟩	kʷʼ ⟨k̓ʷ⟩	qʼ ⟨q̓⟩	qʷʼ ⟨q̓ʷ⟩	
Fricative				ɬ ⟨ɬ/ł⟩	s ~ ʃ ⟨s/š⟩		x ⟨x⟩	xʷ ⟨xʷ⟩	χ ⟨x̌/x̣⟩	χʷ ⟨x̌ʷ/x̣ʷ⟩	h ⟨h⟩
Sonorant	plain	m ⟨m⟩	n ⟨n⟩	l ⟨l⟩		j ⟨y⟩	ɣ ⟨ɣ⟩ (Note: Only occurs in some dialects.)	w ⟨w⟩	ʕ ⟨ʕ⟩ (Note: Sometimes realized as a uvular flap in the Southern Okanagan dialect.)	ʕʷ ⟨ʕʷ⟩	
Sonorant	glottalic	mˀ ⟨m̓⟩	nˀ ⟨n̓⟩	lˀ ⟨l̓⟩		jˀ ⟨y̓⟩		wˀ ⟨w̓⟩	ʕˀ ⟨ʕ̓⟩	ʕˀʷ ⟨ʕ̓ʷ⟩	
Trill	plain		r ⟨r⟩								
Trill	glottalic		rˀ ⟨r̓⟩								

=== Vowels ===
The vowels found in Lakes are: [i], [a], [u], [ə], and [o]. Stress will fall only on the full vowels [i], [a], and [u] in Okanagan.

	Front	Central	Back
Close	i ⟨i⟩		u ⟨u⟩
Mid		ə ⟨ə⟩ (Note: The [ə] is the single unstressed variant of the full vowels in Okanagan)	o ⟨o⟩ (Note: The [o] vowel is found only in borrowed words)
Open		a ⟨a⟩	

== Orthography ==
Okanagan alphabets are always unicase, with no capital letters.

Paul Creek Language Association alphabet
Letter	Letter name	IPA	English explanation	Nsyilxcn example
a	a	/a/	as in the word father	anwí (it is you)
c	ci	/t͡ʃ/	as in the word church	cʕas (crash)
c̓	c̓a	/t͡sʼ/	as in the word cats	c̓ałt (cold)
ə	ə	/ə/	as in the word elephant	əcxʷuy (goes)
h	ha	/h/	as in the word happy	hiw̓t (rat)
i	is	/i/	as in the word see	ixíʔ (that/then)
k	kut	/k/	as in the word kite	kilx (hand)
k̓	k̓it	/kʼ/	is pronounced as a hard k	k̓ast (bad)
kʷ	kʷup	/kʷ/	as in the word queen	kʷint (take)
k̓ʷ	k̓ʷap	/kʷʼ/	is pronounced as a hard kʷ	k̓ʷck̓ʷact (strong)
l	li	/l/	as in the word love	limt (happy)
l̓	əl̓	/lˀ/	pronounced as an abruptly stopped l	sl̓ax̌t (friend)
ł	łu	/ɬ/	pronounced as a slurpy l	łt̓ap (bounce/jump)
ƛ̓	ƛ̓i	/t͡ɬʼ/	pronounced as a click tl out of the side of the mouth	ƛ̓lap (stop)
m	mi	/m/	as in the word mom	mahúyaʔ (raccoon)
m̓	əm̓	/mˀ/	pronounced as an abruptly ended m	stim̓ (what)
n	nu	/n/	as in the word no	naqs (one)
n̓	ən̓	/nˀ/	pronounce as an abruptly stopped n	n̓in̓wiʔs (later)
p	pi	/p/	as in the word pop	pn̓kin̓ (when)
p̓	p̓a	/pʼ/	pronounced as a popped p	p̓um (brown)
q	qi	/q/	pronounced as a k deep in the back of the throat	qáqnaʔ (grandma)
q̓	q̓u	/qʼ/	pronounced as a hard q	q̓aʔxán (shoe)
qʷ	qʷa	/qʷ/	pronounced as a q with rounded lips	qʷacqn (hat)
q̓ʷ	q̓ʷʕay	/qʷʼ/	pronounced as a hard q with rounded lips	q̓ʷmqin (antler)
r	ri	/r/	pronounced rolled on the tongue	yirncút (make itself round)
s	sas	/s/	as in the word sister	síyaʔ (saskatoon/sarvis/June berry)
t	ti	/t/	as in the word top	tum̓ (mother)
t̓	t̓a	/tʼ/	pronounced as a hard t	t̓ínaʔ (ear)
u	u	/u/	as in the word soon	uł (and)
w	wa	/w/	as in the word walk	wikn (I saw it)
w̓	əw̓s	/wˀ/	pronounced as an abruptly ended w	sw̓aw̓ásaʔ (auntie)
x	xu	/x/	pronounced as a soft h in the back of the throat	xixəw̓tm (girl)
x̌	x̌a	/χ/	pronounced as a guttural h deep in the back of the throat	x̌ast (good)
xʷ	xʷi	/xʷ/	pronounced as an h in the back of the throat but with rounded lips	xʷuy (go)
x̌ʷ	x̌ʷay	/χʷ/	pronounced as a guttural h in the back of the throat but with rounded lips	x̌ʷus (foam)
y	yi	/j/	as in the word yellow	yus (dark/purple)
y̓	y̓u	/jˀ/	pronounced as an abruptly ended y	c̓sy̓aqn (head)
ʔ	ʔət	/ʔ/	is a breath stop in the back of the throat as in the word uh-oh	ʔaʔúsaʔ (egg)
ʕ	ʕay	/ʕ/	pronounced as a short a deep in the back of the throat	ʕaymt (angry)
ʕ̓	ʕ̓aw	/ʕˀ/	pronounced as an abruptly ended ʕ	ʕ̓ac̓nt (look)
ʕʷ	(?)	/ʕʷ/	pronounced as a nasally ow in the back of the throat	kaʕʷm (pray)

The letters with acute accent ⟨á⟩, ⟨ə́⟩, ⟨í⟩, and ⟨ú⟩ are not counted as separate letters in this alphabet.

Westbank First Nation alphabet
a	á	c	cʼ	ə	ə́	ɣ	ɣʼ	h	ḥ	i	í	k	kʼ	kʷ	kʼʷ	l	lʼ	ɬ	ƛʼ	m	mʼ	n	nʼ	p
t	qʼʷ	qʼ	qʷ	q	r	rʼ	s	pʼ	tʼ	u	ú	w	wʼ	x	xʷ	x̌	x̌ʷ	y	yʼ	ʔ	ʕ	ʕʼ	ʕʷ	ʕʼʷ

== Grammar ==
=== Morphology ===
The morphology of Okanagan is fairly complex. It is a head-marking language that relies mostly on grammatical information being placed directly on the predicate by means of affixes and clitics. The combination of derivational and inflectional suffixes and prefixes that are added onto the stem words make for a compact language.

==== Person markers ====
Okanagan demonstrates great flexibility when dealing with persons, number, and gender. The language encodes the person via a series of prefixes and suffixes, and uses its number system in tandem with pluralized pronominals to communicate the number of actors within a sentence. For example:

k- kaˀ- kaˀɬis
num.CL PL.REDUP three
"There are three people"

In this example the k- classification designates that the word contains a numeral classifier.

Additionally, Okanagan relies heavily on the use of suffixes to designate gender. Okanagan handles gender in much the same way; by attaching both a determiner and 'man' to the sentence, the gender of an object or subject can be communicated:

an-kɬ tkɬmílxʷ
2SG.POSS-to be-woman
"She is your wife to be"

In this example, there is a combination of 2nd singular marker with 'wife'. 'She' is encoded into the meaning of the word via the inclusion of the gender suffix at the end of the sentence.

Person markers within Okanagan are attached to verbs, nouns, or adjectives. The marker used depending on transitivity of verbs and other conditions outlined below. The person maker used largely depends on the case being used in the sentence.

==== Absolutive case ====
Absolutive markers within Okanagan can only be used if the predicate of the sentence is intransitive. For example, Kən c'k-am (I count) is perfectly viable in Okanagan, but *Kən c'k-ən-t *(I count it) is not, because the verb 'count' is transitive. Person markers never occur without an accompanying intransitive verb.

	Singular	Plural
1st person	kən	kʷu
2nd person	kʷ	p
3rd person	∅	(...-əlx)

==== Possessive case ====
Simple possessives within Okanagan are predominantly a result of prefixation and circumfixation on a verb. However, Okanagan uses simple possessives as aspect forms on the verb in very complex ways. This practice is predominantly seen in Southern interior Salish languages.

The stem: kilx 'hand'
Possessive	Example	Use	Morphological process	Translation
1st SG	inkilx	in-kilx	prefix	my-hand
2nd SG	ankilx	an-kilx	prefix	your-hand
3rd SG	iʔ kilxs	iʔ⟩kilx⟨s	circumfix	his/her⟩hand⟨
1st PL	iʔ kilxtət	iʔ⟩kilx⟨tət	circumfix	Our⟩hand⟨
2nd PL	iʔ kilxəmp	iʔ⟩kilx⟨əmp	circumfix	Your.PL⟩hand⟨
3rd PL	iʔ kilxsəlx	iʔ⟩kilx⟨səlx	circumfix	Their⟩hand⟨

Where prefixation occurs with -in / -an in the 1st and 2nd person singular, /n/ may undergo deletion as below:

in- s- xʷuy -tan
1sg.POSS- NOM- go -INST
"They are my tracks."

an- kɬ- tkɬmilxʷ
2sg.POSS- {to be} -woman
"She is your wife to be."

an- nik'mən
2sg.POSS- knife
"your knife"

==== Ergative case ====
In the case of verbs, Okanagan morphology handles transitivity in various ways. The first is a set of rules for transitive verbs that only have a single direct object (monotransitive). For the ergative case, there are two variants of person markers: a stressed and an unstressed.

	Stressed	Unstressed
1st SG	-ín	-n
2nd SG	-íxʷ	-xʷ
3rd SG	-ís	-s
1st PL	-ím	-m
2nd PL	-ip	-p
3rd PL	-ísəlx	-səlx

The stem: c'k-ən-t is the equivalent of the transitive verb 'count.'

	Example	Use	Translation
1st SG	c̓kəntin	c'k-ən-t-ín	I count it
2nd SG	c̓kəntixʷ	c'k-ən-t-íxʷ	You count it
3rd SG	c̓kəntis	c'k-ən-t-ís	S/he counts it
1st PL	c̓kəntim	c'k-ən-t-ím	We count it
2nd PL	c̓kəntip	c'k-ən-t-íp	You (PL) count it
3rd PL	c̓kəntisəlx	c'k-ən-t-ísəlx	They count it

wikn̓t (see it) is an example of a strong -nt- transitive past/present verb, with 'XX' identifying non-occurring combinations and '--' identifying semantic combinations which require the reflexive suffix -cut-.

Two-participant event inflections: wikn̓t
Transitive inflection			Experiencer					
Transitive inflection			Singular			Plural		
Transitive inflection			1	2	3	1	2	3
Executor	Sg	1	--	wikn̓tsn̓	wikn̓	XX	wikłəm̓n̓	wikn̓əl̓x
Executor	Sg	2	kʷuʔ wikn̓txʷ	--	wikn̓txʷ	kʷuʔ wikn̓txʷ	XX	wikn̓txʷəl̓x
Executor	Sg	3	kʷuʔ wiks	wikn̓ts	wiks	kʷuʔ wikn̓tm̓	wikłəm̓s	wiksəl̓x
Executor	Pl	1	XX	wikn̓tst	wikn̓tm̓	--	wikłəm̓t	wikn̓tm̓əl̓x
Executor	Pl	2	kʷuʔ wikn̓tp	XX	wikn̓tp	kʷuʔ wikn̓tp	--	wikn̓tpəl̓x
Executor	Pl	3	kʷuʔ wiksəl̓x	wikn̓tsəl̓x	wiksəl̓x	kʷuʔ wikn̓tm̓əl̓x	wikłəm̓səl̓x	wikn̓tm̓əl̓x

==== Accusative case ====
There are two sets of verb affixes each containing two members that dictate the composition of a verb. The first set is composed of the affixes -nt-, and -ɬt-. The second set is composed of -st- and x(i)t- where 'i' is a stressed vowel.

The major difference between two sets is how they incorporate affixes to remain grammatically correct. In the case of the -nt-, -ɬt- group, all particles and suffixes joining onto the stem and suffix of the verb will be identical for both. The -nt- affix connects to the stem of a transitive verb via suffixation. The suffix -nt- can only make reference to two persons: an actor and a primary goal.

q̓y̓əntin q'y'-ənt-in (I write something)

The -ɬt- affix is the ditransitive counterpart of -nt- and works in much the same. The difference between the two is that it refers to three persons: an actor, and two other actors or goals. Furthermore, -ɬt- is further differentiated from its ditransitive cousin -x(i)t- because it does not require a clitic to be a part of the verb.

In contrast to this group, -st- and -x(i)t- operate by unique rules. The -st- affix, much like its counterpart, must be added to a verb stem by means of suffixation; it is also transitive, and refers to an actor and a primary goal, but it implies a reference to a third person, or a secondary goal without explicitly stating it.

q̓y̓əstin q'y'-əst-in. (I write it [for myself])

The -x(i)t- ditransitive affix shares all of the features of -ɬt- with the sole exception that it requires a clitic to be attached to front of the verb stem. The reason for the clitic in Okanagan is to add emphasis or focus on the second object, whereas -ɬt- makes no distinction.

=== Predicates and arguments ===
Each clause in Okanagan can be divided into two parts: inflected predicates which are required for every sentence, and optional arguments. Okanagan allows a maximum of two arguments per sentence construction. These are marked by pronominal markers on the predicate. Each argument is introduced to the sentence via an initial determiner; the only exception to initial determiners is in the case of proper names which do not need determiners to introduce them. Predicates may be of any lexical category. There may be additional arguments added to a sentence in Okanagan via complementizers. Okanagan is unique among the majority of Salish languages for the inclusion of the complementizer.

==== Obliques ====
Okanagan has one oblique marker that serves adapts it to several different functions depending upon the context in which it is used. The oblique marker 't' can be used to mark the object of an intransitive verb, as in the case below.

kən ˀiɬən t sɬiqʷ
I eat OBL meat
I ate (some) meat

't' may also mark the agent in a passive construction, and it may be used to mark the ergative agent of transitive verbs. Finally, the oblique 't' may be used to mark functions including time and instrument:

kən txam t sx̌əx̌c'iˀ
I comb OBL stick
"I combed my hair with a stick"

't' may also coincide with the determiner 'iʔ' in the case of instrumentals and passive agents:

tʕapəntís [iʔ [t swlwlmínk] ].
shoot-DIR-3SG.ERG DET OBL gun {}
He shot it with a gun.

Mike cúmqs-nt-m [iʔ [t tkɬmílxʷ] ].
Mike kiss-DIR-PASS DET OBL woman {}
Mike was kissed by the woman.

==== Complements ====
There are a number of complements available to Okanagan to clarify its predicates; among these are positional complements, which merely indicate the place of a predicate, and a variety of marked complements, used to express further meaning through a series of particles.

The first of the marked complements is the prefix yi. For the most part, yi is an optional complement that is used in definite cases with the exception of cases when a proper noun is used. In such cases, the yi prefix is not allowed. When yi is used it refers to a definite referent.

wikən yiʔ sqilxʷ "I saw the/those people." The sequential complements are composed of the particles ɬ and ɬa. ɬa conveys temporal sequence while ɬ represents a subordinate element.

way̓ x̌ast ɬ kʷ cxʷuy̓ "It's good if/that you come."

way̓ x̌ast ɬa kʷ cxʷuy̓ "It will be good when/after you come."

Okanagan also contains a number of locational complements which refer to when or where something happened, serving as a point of reference. The l and the variant lə particles are used to tie a predicate to a time or place.

xʷuy̓ lə sənkʷəkʷəʔac. "He went in the night"

Ablative complements in Okanagan come in the form of the tl particle. Along with directional complements, k̓ and k̓l, Okanagan speakers can indicate motion. The ablative complement tl only serves to indicate 'moving away from.' For instance, in the sentence below, the ablative is 'from (across the ocean).'

Kʷ scutxx tl sk̓ʷətikənx "Were you saying [that he is] from Seattle?"

The directional complement's two particles represent both direction towards something, and direction towards a specific location. k signifies movement towards something:

k̓ incitxʷ "to my house" (not towards it)

The k̓l particle modifies this sentence so that it specifies the house as the location to which the subject must move. k̓əl incitxʷ "To my house" (there specifically)

=== Verb classification ===
Verbs may react in multiple ways when a suffix is attached to the root stem of the word. Below are a number of ways in which intransitive roots are modified.

- -t can indicate a natural characteristic of the root
  - c̓ik̓ "burn"
  - c̓ik̓t "burned"
- -lx indicates the subject is engaged in an activity
  - qiclx "run"
- -ils expresses state of mind.
  - nk̓wpils "lonely"
- -p expresses lack of a subject's control
  - kmap "darkening"

Transitives:

- -n involves action upon an object by a subject
  - kʷuʔ caʔntis "he hit me"
- -s involves action or state resulting from an activity.
  - kʷu cˀaistixʷ
- -cut indicates when the action of a subject is directed toward oneself.
  - tarqncut "kick oneself"
- Transitive stems without person markings indicate imperatives
  - nlk̓ipnt "open it"
- Intransitives can express an imperative via the -x suffix:
  - xʷuyx "go"

=== Space, time, and modality ===
The Okanagan system relies heavily on its affixes to demonstrate tense, space, and time. Below are demonstrated various affixes that attach to roots to encode meaning.

The following two examples are only possible in the -n transitive paradigm:

ks- unrealized action ikstxt̓ám "I'm going to look after him"

səc- past perfect ˁi-səc-txt'-am "I've been looking after him."

The following examples are for intransitives.

-k Unrealized: expresses an intentional future action or state. (I am going to...) Kn kʷal̓t " I'm warm"

-aʔx Continuative: Action or state that is in progress kn scpútaʔx "I am celebrating"

==== Directional prefixes ====
- ɬ- Movement back
- c- Movement toward speaker
- kɬ- down, and under

==== Prepositional case-markings for oblique objects ====
- tl̓ from, source.
- k̓l to, at, goal, recipient, dative.
- k̓ for, benefactive.
- l on, locative.
- nˁəɬ with, comitative.
- ˁit with, by, instrumental

== See also ==
- Okanagan Nation Alliance
- Sinixt people

== Bibliography ==
=== Language learning texts ===
- Peterson, Wiley, and Parkin. (2004). Nsəlxcin 1: A Beginning Course in Colville-Okanagan Salish. The Paul Creek Language Association.
- Peterson and Parkin. (2005). Captíkʷł 1: Nsəlxcin Stories for Beginners. The Paul Creek Language Association.
- Peterson and Parkin. (2007). Nsəlxcin 2: An Intermediate Course in Okanagan Salish. The Paul Creek Language Association.
- Peterson and Parkin. (2007). Captíkʷł 2: More Nsəlxcin Stories for Beginners. The Paul Creek Language Association.
- Peterson and Parkin. (In Press). Nsəlxcin 3. The Paul Creek Language Association.
- Peterson and Parkin. (In Press). Captíkʷł 3. The Paul Creek Language Association.
- Manuel, Herbert, and Anthony Mattina. (1983). Okanagan Pronunciation Primer. University of Montana Linguistics Laboratory.

=== Narratives, songbooks, dictionaries, and word lists ===
- Doak, Ivy G. (1983). The 1908 Okanagan Word Lists of James Teit. Missoula, Montana: Dept. of Anthropology, University of Montana, 1983.
- Mattina, Anthony and Madeline DeSautel. (2002). Dora Noyes DeSautel łaʔ kłcaptikʷł: Okanagan Salish Narratives. University of Montana Occasional Papers in Linguistics 15.
- Seymour, Peter, Madeline DeSautel, and Anthony Mattina. (1985). The Golden Woman: The Colville Narrative of Peter J. Seymour. Tucson: University of Arizona Press.
- Seymour, Peter, Madeline DeSautel, and Anthony Mattina. (1974). The Narrative of Peter J. Seymour Blue Jay and His Brother-In-Law Wolf.
- Lindley, Lottie & John Lyon. (2012). 12 Upper Nicola Okanagan Texts. ICSNL 47, UBCWPL vol. 32, Vancouver BC.
- Lindley, Lottie & John Lyon. (2013). 12 More Upper Nicola Okanagan Narratives. ICSNL 48, UBCWPL vol. 35, Vancouver BC.
- Mattina, Anthony. Colville-Okanagan Dictionary. Missoula, Mont: Dept. of Anthropology, University of Montana, 1987.
- Pierre, Larry and Martin Louie. (1973). Classified Word List for the Okanagan Language. MS, Penticton, B.C.
- Purl, Douglas. (1974). The Narrative of Peter J. Seymour: Blue Jay and Wolf. ICSL 9, Vancouver, B.C.
- Someday, James B. (1980). Colville Indian Language Dictionary. Ed.D. dissertation, University of North Dakota, Grand Forks. DAI 41A:1048.
- Peterson and Parkin n̓səl̓xcin iʔ‿sn̓kʷnim: Songs for Beginners in Okanagan Salish. The Paul Creek Language Association.
- Peterson and Parkin n̓səl̓xcin iʔ‿sn̓kʷnim 2: More Songs for Beginners in Okanagan Salish. The Paul Creek Language Association.
- Peterson and Parkin. n̓səl̓xcin iʔ‿sn̓kʷnim 3: Even More Songs for Beginners in Colville-Okanagan. The Paul Creek Language Association.

=== Linguistic descriptions and reviews ===
- Arrowsmith, Gary L. (1968). Colville Phonemics. M.A. thesis, University of Washington, Seattle.
- Baptiste, M. (2002). Wh-Questions in Okanagan Salish. M.A. thesis, University of British Columbia, Vancouver, B.C.
- Barthmaier, Paul. (2004). Intonation Units in Okanagan. Pp. 30–42 of Gerdts and Matthewson (eds.) 2004.
- Barthmaier, Paul. (2002). Transitivity and Lexical Suffixes in Okanagan. Papers for ICSNL 37 (Gillon, C., N. Sawai, and R. Wojdak, eds.). UBCWPL 9:1–17.
- Charlie, William M., Clara Jack, and Anthony Mattina. (1988). William Charlie's "Two-Headed Person": Preliminary Notes on Colville-Okanagan Oratory. ICSNL 23 (s.p.), Eugene, Oregon.
- Dilts, Philip. (2006). An Analysis of the Okanagan "Middle" Marker -M. Papers for ICSNL 41 (Kiyota, M., J. Thompson, and N. Yamane-Tanaka, eds.). UBCWPL 11:77–98.
- Doak, Ivy G. (1981). A Note on Plural Suppletion in Colville Okanagan. Pp. 143–147 of (Anthony) Mattina and Montler (eds.) 1981.
- Doak, Ivy G. (2004). [Review of Dora Noyes DeSautel ła' kłcaptíkwł ([Anthony] Mattina and DeSautel) [eds.] 2002.] AL 46:220–222.
- Doak, Ivy and Anthony Mattina. (1997). Okanagan -lx, Coeur d'Alene -lš, and Cognate Forms. IJAL 63:334–361.
- Fleisher, Mark S. (1979). A Note on Schuhmacher's Inference of wahú' in Colville Salish. IJAL 45:279–280.
- Galloway, Brent D. (1991). [Review of Colville-Okanagan Dictionary ([Anthony] Mattina 1987).] IJAL 57:402–405.
- Harrington, John P. (1942). Lummi and Nespelem Fieldnotes. Microfilm reel No. 015, remaining data as per Harrington 1910.
- Hébert, Yvonne M. (1978). Sandhi in a Salishan Language: Okanagan. ICSL 13:26–56, Victoria, B.C.
- Hébert, Yvonne M. (1979). A Note on Aspect in (Nicola Lake) Okanagan. ICSL 14:173–209, Bellingham, Washington.
- Hébert, Yvonne M. (1982a). Transitivity in (Nicola Lake) Okanagan. Ph.D. dissertation, University of British Columbia, Vancouver, B.C. DAI 43A:3896.
- Hébert, Yvonne M. (1982b). Aspect and Transitivity in (Nicola Lake) Okanagan. Syntax and Semantics 15:195–215.
- Hébert, Yvonne M. (1983). Noun and Verb in a Salishan Language. KWPL 8:31–81.
- Hill-Tout, Charles. (1911). Report on the Ethnology of the Okanák.ēn of British Columbia, an Interior Division of the Salish Stock. JAIGBI 41:130–161. London.
- Kennedy, Dorothy I. D. and Randall T. [Randy] Bouchard. (1998). 'Northern Okanagan, Lakes, and Colville.' Pp. 238–252 of Walker Jr. (vol. ed.) 1998.
- Kinkade, M. Dale. (1967). On the Identification of the Methows (Salish). IJAL 33:193–197.
- Kinkade, M. Dale. (1987). [Review of The Golden Woman: The Colville Narrative of Peter J. Seymour (Mattina 1985).] Western Folklore 46:213–214.
- Kroeber, Karl, and Eric P. Hamp. (1989). [Review of The Golden Woman: The Colville Narrative of Peter J. Seymour (Mattina, ed.).] IJAL 55:94–97.
- Krueger, John R. (1967). Miscellanea Selica V: English-Salish Index and Finder List. AL 9(2):12–25.
- Lyon, John (2013). Predication and Equation in Okanagan Salish: The Syntax and Semantics of DPs and Non-verbal Predication University of British Columbia, PhD Dissertation. (http://hdl.handle.net/2429/45684)
- Lyon, John. (2013). Oblique Marked Relatives in Southern Interior Salish: Implications for the Movement Analysis. Canadian Journal of Linguistics 58:2. pp 349–382.
- Mattina, Anthony and Clara Jack. (1982). Okanagan Communication and Language. ICSNL 17:269–294, Portland, Oregon.
- Mattina, Anthony and Clara Jack. (1986). Okanagan-Colville Kinship Terms. ICSNL 21:339–346, Seattle, Washington. [Published as Mattina and Jack 1992.]
- Mattina, Anthony and Nancy J. Mattina (1995). Okanagan ks- and -kł. ICSNL 30, Victoria, B.C.
- Mattina, Anthony and Sarah Peterson. (1997). Diminutives in Colville-Okanagan. ICSNL 32:317–324, Port Angeles, Washington.
- Mattina, Anthony and Allan Taylor. (1984). The Salish Vocabularies of David Thompson. IJAL 50:48–83.
- Mattina, Nancy J. (1993). Some Lexical Properties of Colville-Okanagan Ditransitives. ICSNL 28:265–284, Seattle, Washington.
- Mattina, Nancy J. (1994a). Roots, Bases, and Stems in Colville-Okanagan. ICSNL 29, Pablo, Montana.
- Mattina, Nancy J. (1994b). Argument Structure of Nouns, Nominalizations, and Denominals in Okanagan Salish. Paper presented at the 2nd Annual University of Victoria Salish Morphosyntax Workshop, Victoria, B.C.
- Mattina, Nancy J. (1994c). Notes on Word Order in Colville-Okanagan Salish. NWLC 10:93–102. Burnaby, B.C.: Simon Fraser University.
- Mattina, Nancy J. (1996a). Aspect and Category in Okanagan Word Formation. Ottawa: National Library of Canada = Bibliothèque nationale du Canada, 1997. ISBN 0-612-17011-X
- Mattina, Nancy J. (1996b). Anticausatives in Okanagan. Paper presented at the 4th Annual University of Victoria Salish Morphosyntax Conference, Victoria, B.C.
- Mattina, Nancy J. (1999a). Future in Colville-Okanagan Salish. ICSNL 34:215–230, Kamloops, B.C. [Note also (Nancy) Mattina 1999c.]
- Mattina, Nancy J. (1999b). Toward a History of the Inflectional Future in Colville-Okanagan Salish. University of California Santa Barbara Occasional Papers in Linguistics 17:27–42. Santa Barbara: University of California Santa Barbara.
- Mattina, Nancy J. (2004). smiyáw sucnmínctәxw: Coyote Proposes. Pp. 289–299 of Gerdts and Matthewson (eds.) 2004.
- O'Brien, Michael. (1967). A Phonology of Methow. ICSL 2, Seattle, Washington.
- Pattison, Lois C. (1978). Douglas Lake Okanagan: Phonology and Morphology. M.A. thesis, University of British Columbia.
- Petersen, Janet E. (1980). Colville Lexical Suffixes and Comparative Notes. MS.
- Ray, Verne F. (1932). The Sanpoil and Nespelem: Salish Peoples of Northwestern Washington. UWPA 5. Seattle.
- Schuhmacher, W. W. (1977). The Colville Name for Hawaii. IJAL 43:65–66.
- Spier, Leslie. (1938). The Sinkaietk or Southern Okanagan of Washington. General Series in Anthropology, no. 6. Menasha, Wisconsin: George Banta Publishing.
- Turner, Nancy J., Randy Bouchard, and Dorothy D. Kennedy. (1980). Ethnobotany of the Okanagan-Colville Indians of British Columbia and Washington. Occasional Paper Series 21. Victoria: British Columbia Provincial Museum.
- Vogt, Hans. (1940). Salishan Studies. Comparative Notes on Kalispel, Spokane, Colville and Coeur d'Alene. Oslo: Skrifter utgitt av Det Norske Videnskaps-Akademi i Oslo, II, Hist.-filos. Klasse, No. 2, Jacob Dybwad.
- Watkins, Donald. (1972). A Description of the Phonemes and Position Classes in the Morphology of Head of the Lake Okanagan. Ph.D. dissertation, University of Alberta, Edmonton.
- Watkins, Donald. (1974). A Boas original. IJAL 40:29–43.
- Young, Philip. (1971). A Phonology of Okanogan. M.A. thesis, University of Kansas.
