= Valdes Island =

Coordinates: 49°05′N 123°40′W

- Island
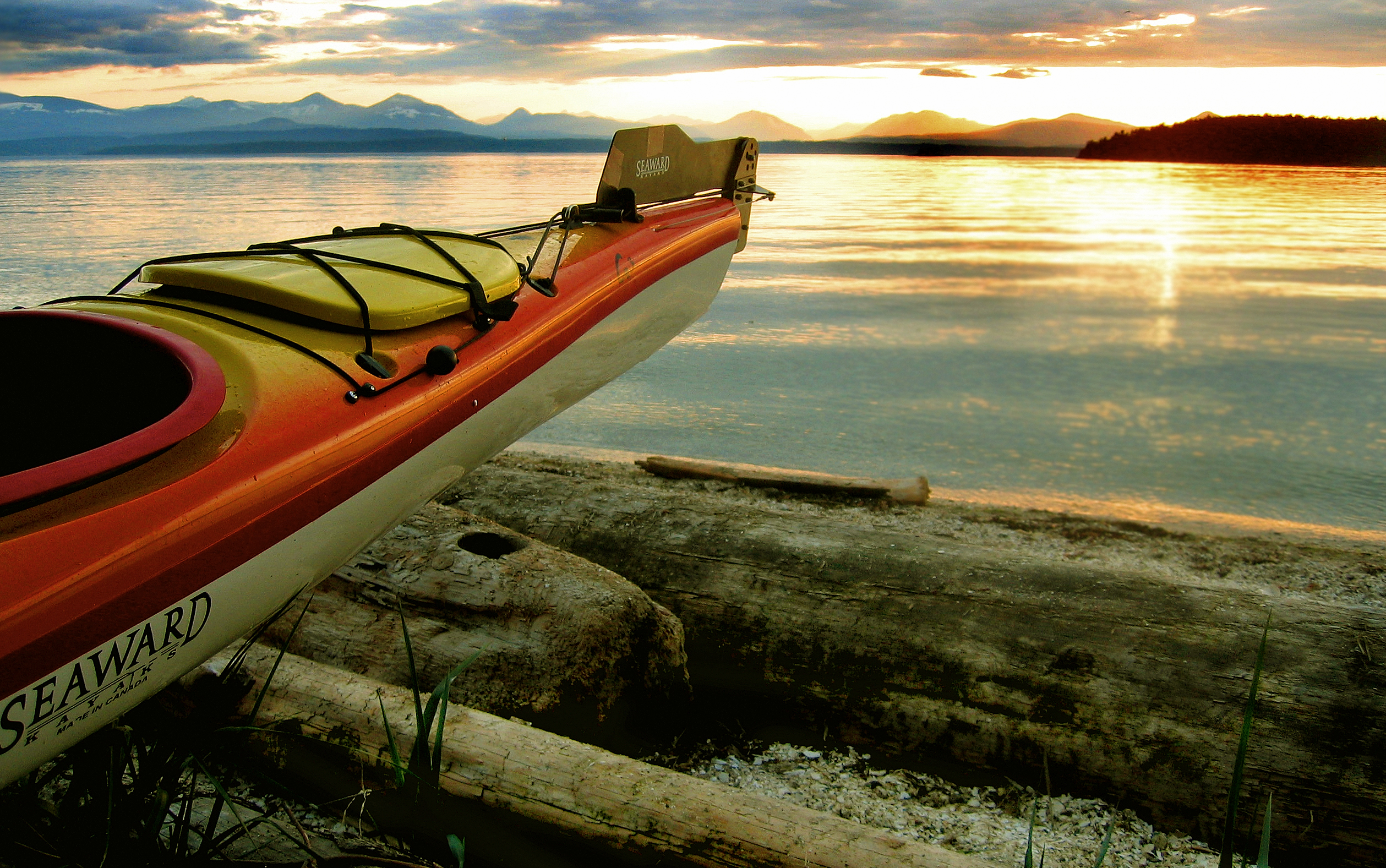
- A kayak and a sunset on Valdes Island.

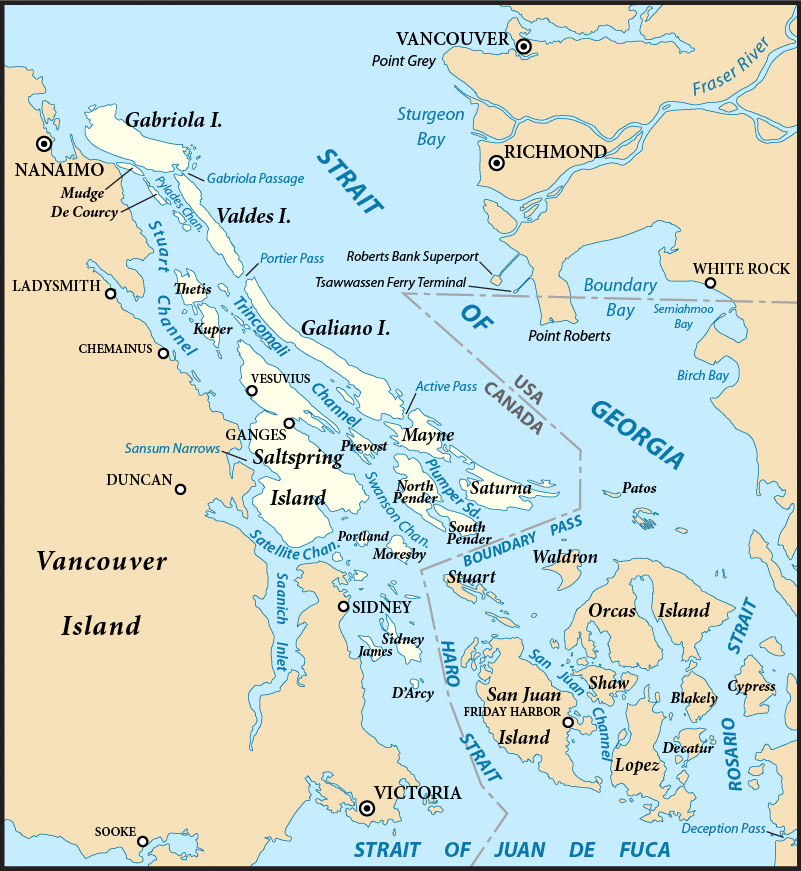
- The Southern Gulf Islands, including Valdes.
- Country: Canada
- Province: British Columbia
- Land district: Cedar Land District
- Region: Southern Gulf Islands

Government
  - MP: Tamara kronis (Conservative)
  - MLA: Doug Routley (BC NDP)

Area
  - Total: 23 km^{2} (8.9 sq mi)

Population (2016)
  - Total: 10
- Population for Dissemination Block 59190308003
- Time zone: UTC−8 (PST)
  - Summer (DST): UTC−7 (PDT)
- Area codes: 250, 778

Valdes Island is one of the Gulf Islands located in the Strait of Georgia, British Columbia, Canada. It is across Porlier Pass from Galiano Island, which lies to the southeast. It has an area of 23 square kilometres (9 square miles), and is 1.6 kilometres (1.0 mile) wide by 16 kilometres (9.9 miles) in length. The island is popular with kayakers, boaters and has historically been the site of several human settlements.

== Naming and early exploration ==
It is named for Spanish explorer Cayetano Valdés y Flores, who first came to the region in 1791 as a lieutenant serving under Captain Alessandro Malaspina on the Descubierta. Valdes returned later in 1792 as captain of the Mexicana to explore the area with Dionisio Alcalá Galiano who captained the Sutil. The island was given its name in 1859 by George Henry Richards, captain of HMS Plumper.

== Settlement ==
Currently there are few permanent residents on Valdes Island. One third of the island is set aside as three Indian reserves of the Lyackson First Nation. At Shingle Point, which is the location of one of those reserves, the island shows evidence of human habitation from at least 5,000 years ago in the form of approximately 60 archeological sites.

=== Brother XII ===
Valdes Island was one of the locations of the colonies of the Aquarian Foundation, the BC-based cult run by Brother XII in the late 1920s and early 1930s The organization had several buildings on the island, of which little trace remains today. There were also rumours that money was buried on the island, but these have never been proven.

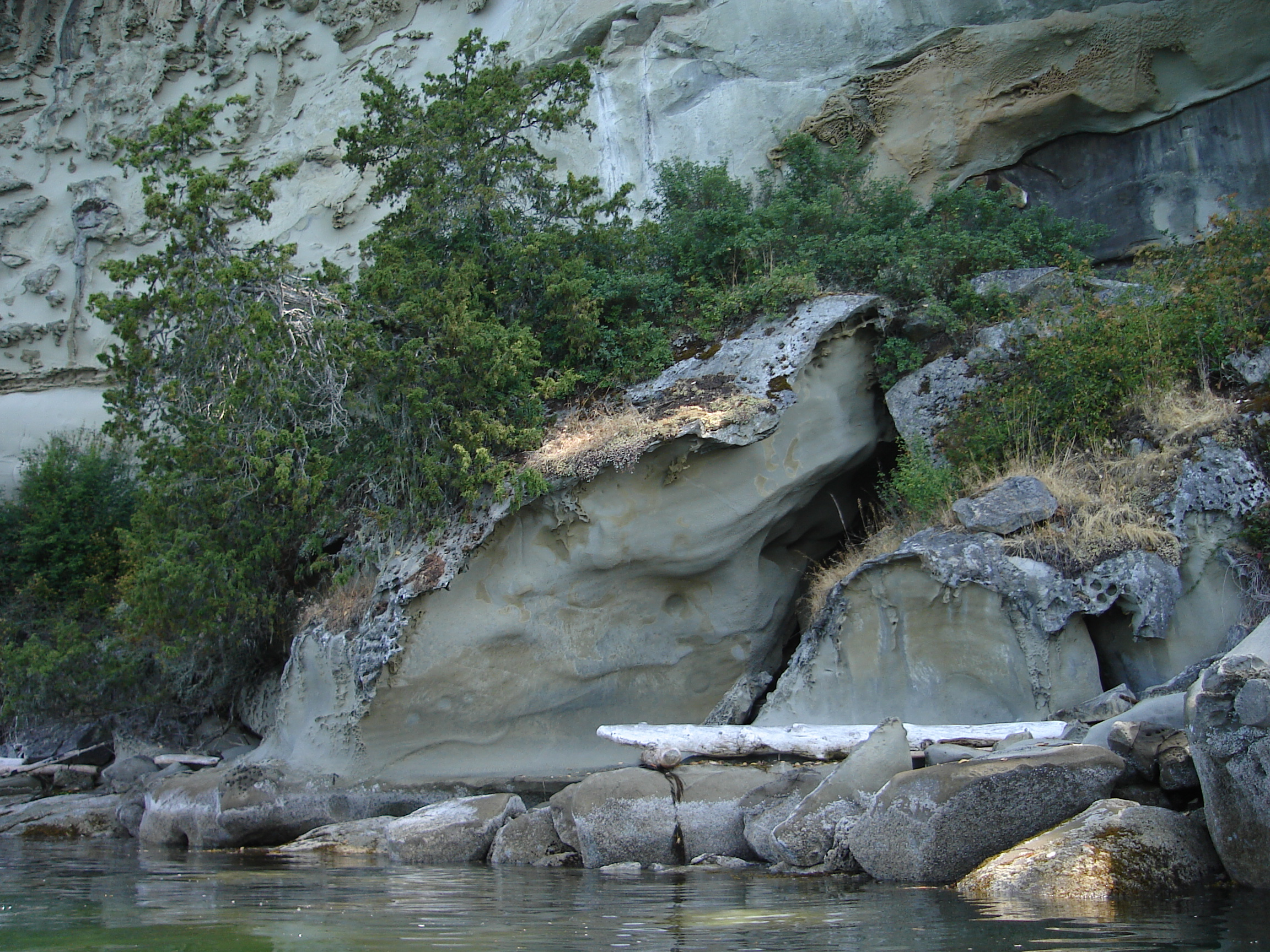
Some of the geology that is commonplace on Valdes island.

== Cave ==
There is a cave in the middle of the island. According to legend, it runs under the sea to emerge on Thetis Island, but recent explorers have found that rockfalls have made remote parts too narrow for human passage.

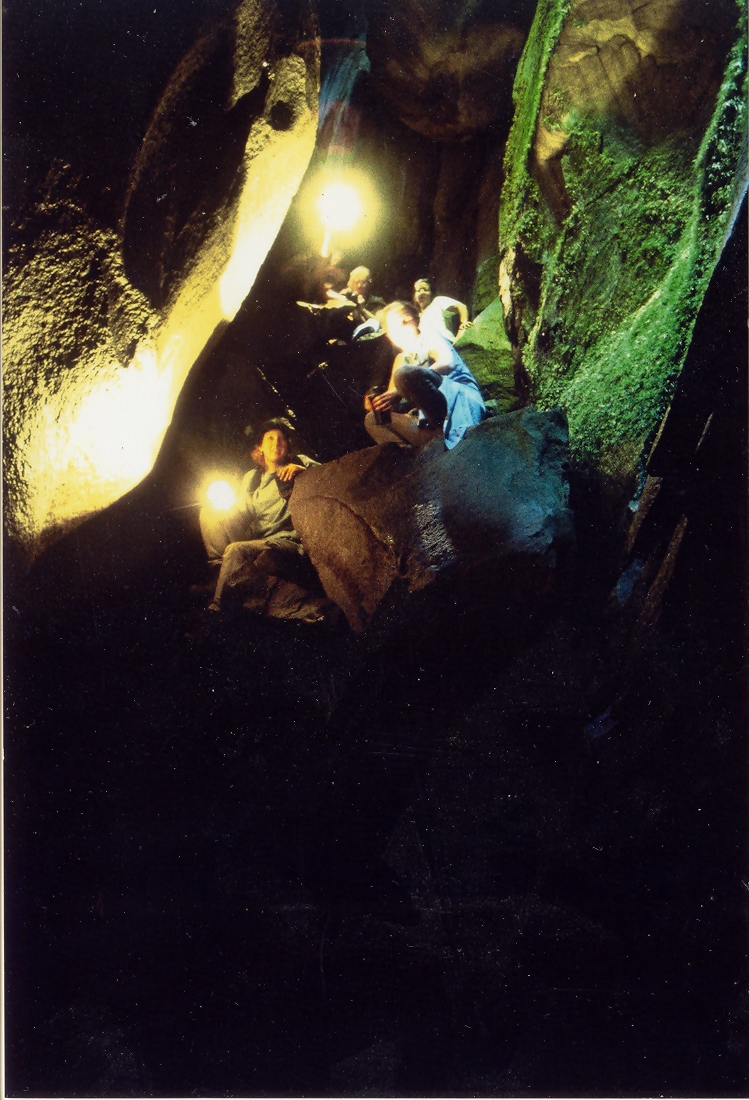
Cave on Valdes Island

== Recreational activities ==
Wakes Cove Provincial Park and the Blackberry Point Campsite are located on the island. These two campsites, as well as an abundance of wildlife and unusual sandstone geology make this island a popular destination for recreational kayaking and camping. The Blackberry Point Campsite was the first campsite established as part of the BC Marine Trails Network by Peter McGee in the early 1990s. The site at Wakes Cove is still undeveloped, lacking any facilities for campers, however there is an abandoned well along an overgrown road in the area. The Blackberry Point site has defined cooking and tenting spaces, trails from the beach as well as a composting toilet.

Orca whales are abundant around the island.
