= Wakes Cove Provincial Park =

Provincial park in British Columbia, Canada

- IUCN category II (national park)
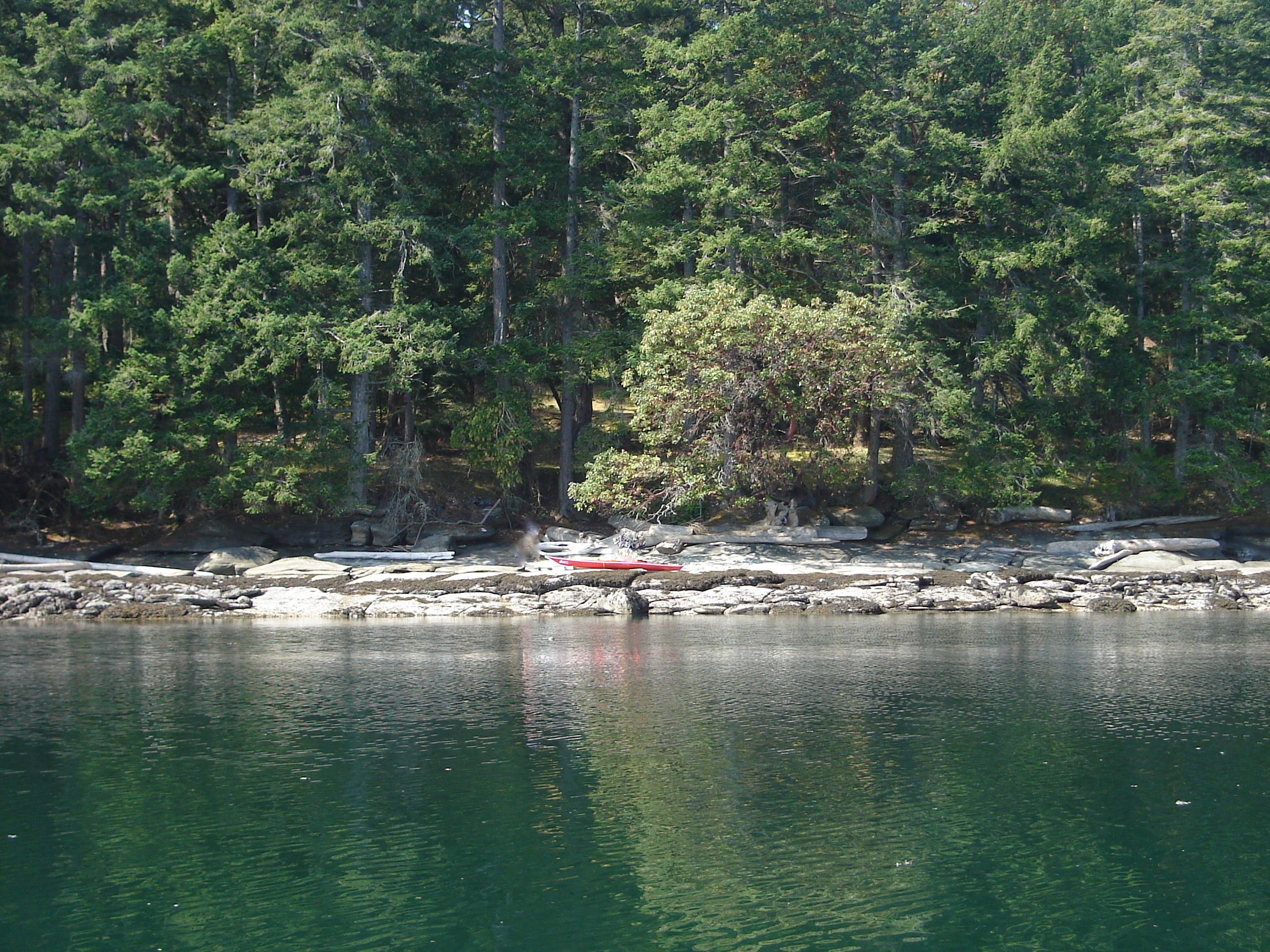
- Shoreline at Wakes Cove

- Location within Vancouver Island Location within British Columbia Location within Cowichan Valley Regional District
- Interactive map of Wakes Cove Provincial Park
- Location: Valdes Island, British Columbia, Canada
- Nearest city: Nanaimo
- Coordinates: 49°7′25″N 123°42′7″W
- Area: 205 ha (510 acres)
- Established: 2002
- Governing body: BC Parks

Wakes Cove Provincial Park is a provincial park in the northeast corner of Valdes Island, located in the Gulf Islands in British Columbia, Canada. The park is only accessible by boat, and can be found on Marine Chart #3475 for further navigation details.

== History ==
The park was created in June 2002. The park is named for British retired naval Captain Baldwin Wake who purchased land in the area in 1876. The land continued to be owned by his descendants until the 1920s. Captain Wake went missing while sailing his sloop. Remains of his boat and belongings washed up on Thetis Island, but his body was never recovered.

== Leisure use ==
Currently the park has no facilities for overnight camping, and its intended use, as stated by BC parks, is picnicking and hiking, with a view towards the development of expanded facilities in the future. The BC government has created a purpose statement and zoning plan for the park.
