= Upper Similkameen Indian Band =

First Nations band government in British Columbia, Canada

Upper Similkameen
- Band No. 599
- Upper Smelqmix
- People: Syilx
- Province: British Columbia

Land
- Other reserves: List: Vermilion Forks 1; Chuchuwayha 2, 2C; Wolf Creek 3; Nine Mile Creek 4; Lulu 5; One Mile 6; Iltcoola 7
- Land area: 27.25 km^{2} (10.52 sq mi)

Population (2025)
- On reserve: 60
- On other land: 13
- Off reserve: 269
- Total population: 342

Government
- Chief: Bonnie Jacobson
- Council: Charles Allison; Michael Allison

Tribal Council
- Okanagan Nation Alliance

Website
- usib.ca

The Upper Similkameen Indian Band or Upper Smelqmix (Okanagan: Tk̓r̓miw̓s), is a First Nations band government in the Canadian province of British Columbia, whose head offices are located in town of Hedley in the Similkameen Country. They are a member of the Okanagan Nation Alliance.

== Population ==
The band's registered population in October 2025 was 342, 269 of whom live off-reserve. Most of the band live on Chuchuwayha Indian Reserve No. 2.

== Indian reserves ==
Indian reserves under the band's jurisdiction are:

- Chuchuwayha Indian Reserve No. 2, on the Similkameen River at the mouth of Hedley Creek, adjacent to the town of Hedley, 2277.10 ha. 49°21′00″N 120°04′00″W
- Chuchuwayha Indian Reserve No. 2C, at the headwaters of Johns Creek, 4 miles southwest of Hedley, 121.40 ha. 49°19′00″N 120°08′00″W
- Iltcoola Indian Reserve No. 7, between Hedley and Princeton just west of Bromley Rock Protected Area, 17.40 ha. 49°25′34″N 120°15′58″W
- Lulu Indian Reserve No. 5, on the left bank of the Similkameen River at the mouth of Arcat Creek, 13 miles east of Princeton, adjacent to Bromley Rock Protected Area, 20.20 ha. 49°24′00″N 120°14′00″W
- Nine Mile Creek Indian Reserve No. 4, on the left bank of the Similkameen River at the mouth of Steven Creek, 80.10 ha. 49°26′00″N 120°18′00″W
- One Mile Indian Reserve No. 6, on west side of the Princeton-Merritt Road 10 miles north of Princeton, 4 ha. 49°36′00″N 120°34′00″W
- Vermilion Forks Indian Reserve No. 1, on the right bank of the Similkameen River, adjacent to the town of Princeton, 3.20 ha. 49°28′00″N 120°31′00″W
- Wolf Creek Indian Reserve No. 3, on the right bank of the Similkameen River at the mouth of Wolfe Creek, 9 miles east of Princeton, 202.50 ha. 49°26′00″N 120°19′00″W

== See also ==
- Syilx
