= Lyackson First Nation =

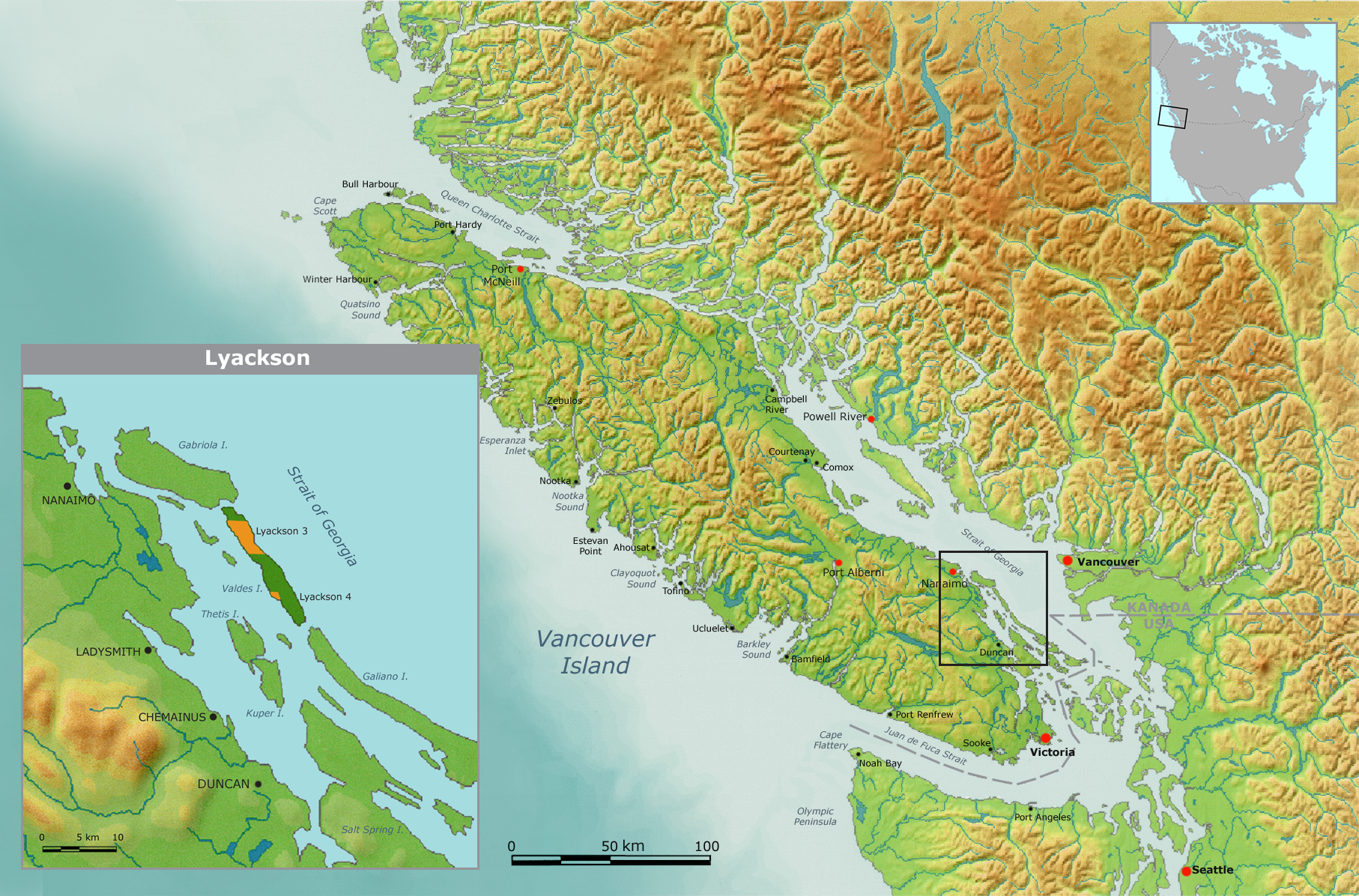
Map of traditional Lyackson tribal territory

Lyackson First Nation (Halkomelem: Leey’qsun) is a First Nations band government located at Chemainus, British Columbia, Canada, on Vancouver Island.

== Chief and Councillors ==
Position	Name	Term start	Term end	Reference
Chief	Richard Thomas	04/19/2006		

== Demographics ==
The Lyackson First Nation has 196 members.

== Indian Reserves ==
The band has three Indian Reserves, all on Valdes Island:

- Lyacksun Indian Reserve No. 3, near north end of Valdes Island, 710.60 ha. 49°06′00″N 123°40′00″W
- Porlier Pass Indian Reserve No. 5, at south tip of Valdes Island, 2.0 ha. 49°01′00″N 123°36′00″W
- Shingle Point Indian Reserve No.4, 32.0 ha. 49°03′00″N 123°38′00″W

== Notable people ==
- “Qwul’sih’yah’maht” Dr. Robina Thomas - Acting President and vice-chancellor / Professor Office of the President / School of Social Work, University of Victoria

== See also ==
- Douglas Treaties
