= Bromley Rock Provincial Park =

Provincial park in British Columbia, Canada

- IUCN category II (national park)
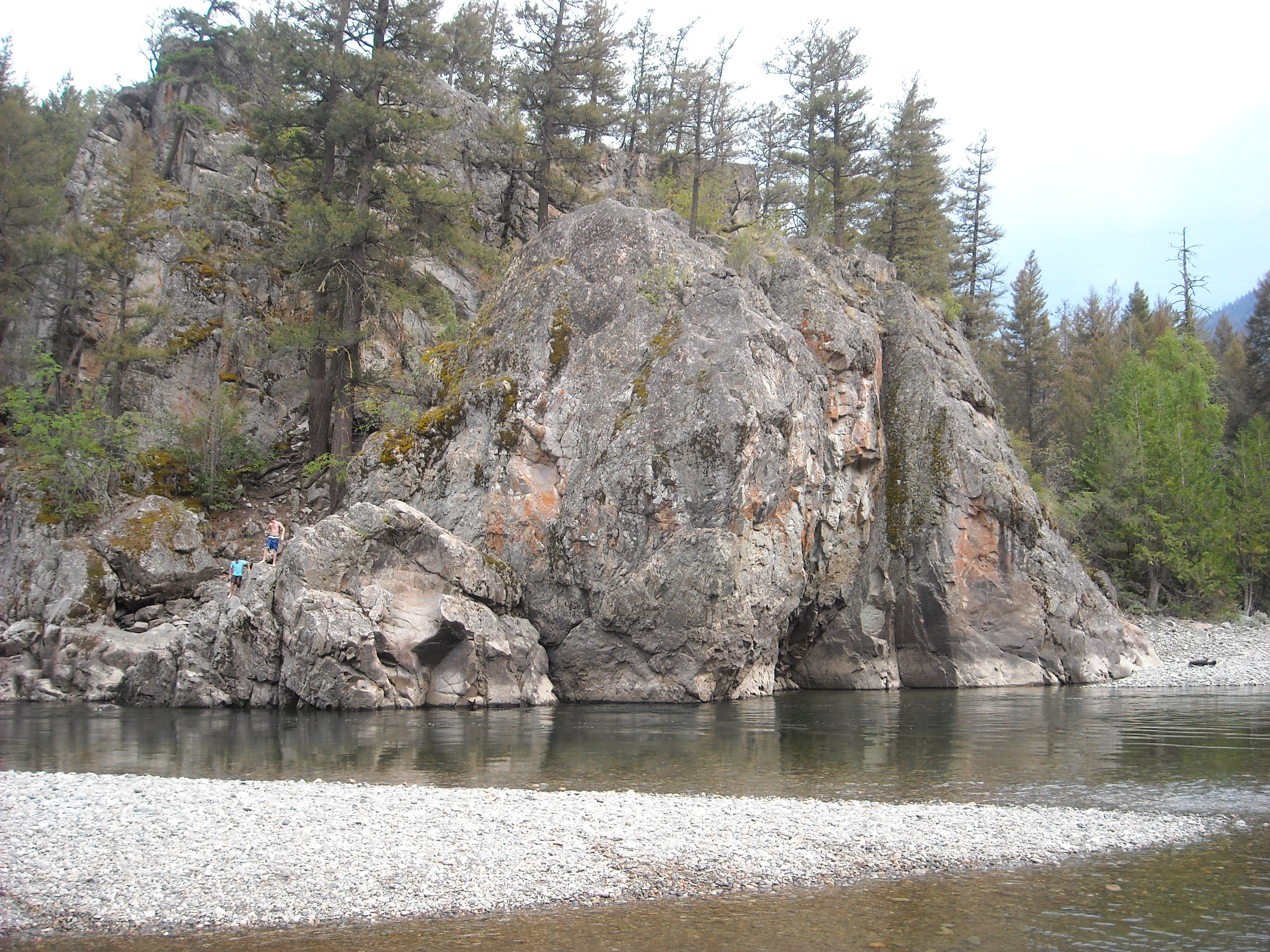
- The cliffs pictured here rise about 50 feet straight out of a deep pool on the Similkameen River. In the summer, when the current isn't too strong, the top of these rocks are often packed with mostly teenagers looking for a good thrill.

- Location within British Columbia
- Interactive map of Bromley Rock Provincial Park
- Location: British Columbia, Canada
- Nearest city: Princeton
- Coordinates: 49°24′58″N 120°15′45″W
- Governing body: BC Parks
- Website: bcparks.ca/bromley-rock-park/

Bromley Rock Provincial Park is a provincial park in British Columbia, Canada. Bromley Rock is a popular swimming, canoeing and cliff jumping destination located on the Similkameen River, approximately fifteen minutes from Princeton.

== History ==
Bromley Rock Provincial Park was established on March 16, 1956. Bromley Rock is a traditional First nations fishing site.
