= Fountain Valley (British Columbia) =

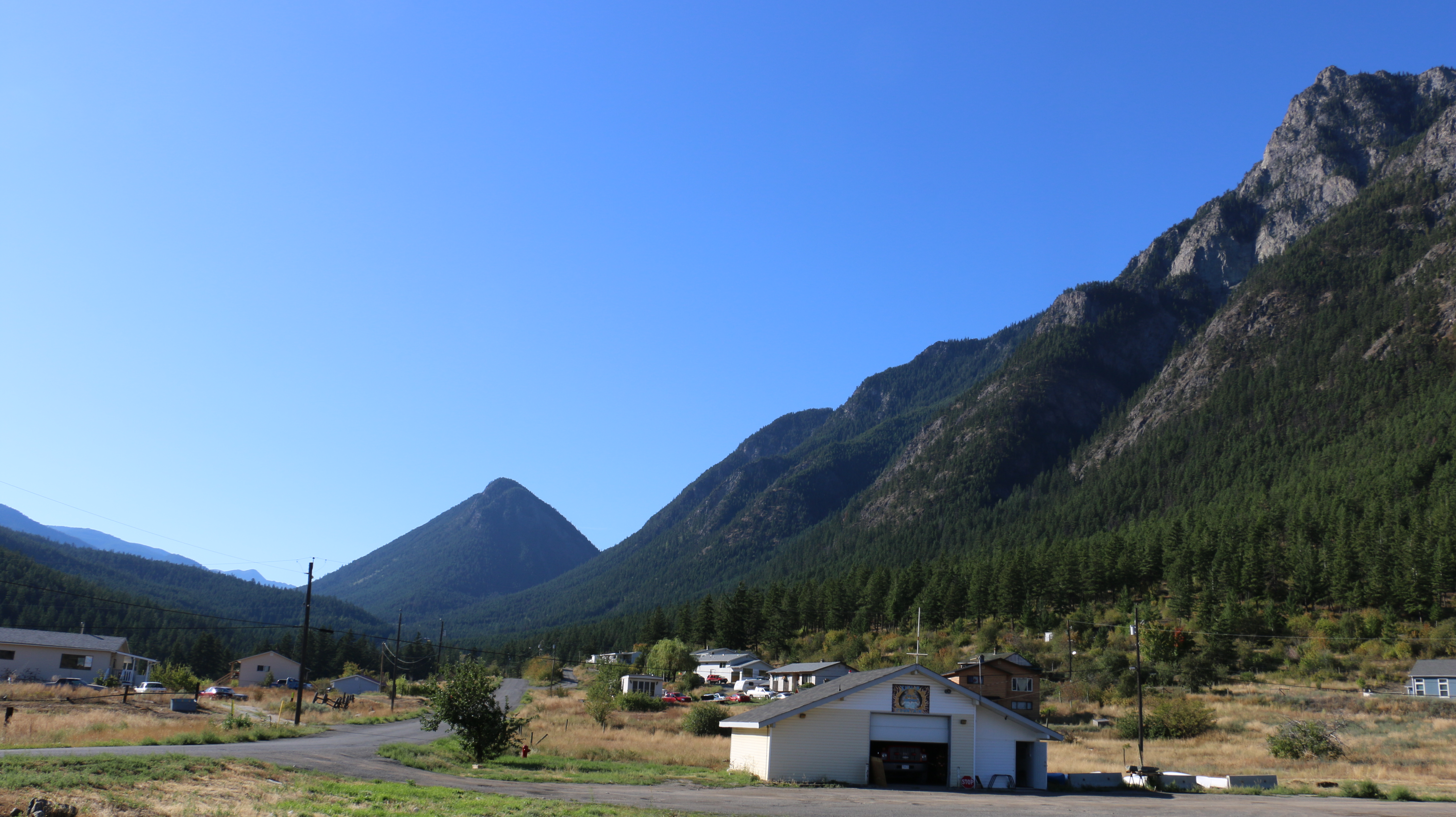

- Location of Fountain Valley in British Columbia
- Coordinates: 50°38′00″N 121°48′00″W
- Country: Canada
- Province: British Columbia
- Time zone: UTC−07:00 (PT)

Fountain Valley, officially named Three Lake Valley and also known as the Fountain Lakes Valley, is a valley and rural community located on the east flank of Fountain Ridge, east of the town of Lillooet, British Columbia, Canada and immediately south of the Indian reserve community of Fountain. The valley is historically significant as part of the River Trail, which ran up the length of the Fraser River from Yale to Big Bar and beyond, diverging at various points to connect to trails further east and with the Old Cariboo Road at Fountain, then known as the Upper Fountains and an important junction and staging-ground for freight wagons and travellers bound northwards to the Cariboo goldfields. The trail through the valley, which developed into a wagon road and is largely used today, climbs a steep grade from its southern end, near Fountainview Farms on the Fraser, and descends relatively gently towards Fountain. The three lakes in the valley, which give it its official name, are Cinquefoil Lake, Kwotlenemo Lake (aka Fountain Lake), and Chilhil Lake, the three of them collectively being known as the Fountain Lakes There are many recreational dwellings and small ranches forming a community in the valley, which is something of a rural "suburb" of Lillooet.

Indian reserves of the Fountain Indian Band located in this valley are Fountain Creek Indian Reserve No. 8, Fountain Indian Reserve No. 4, and Fountain Indian Reserve No. 12, all on Fountain Creek north of the Fountain Lakes, Chilhil Indian Reserve No. 6, south of Chilhil Lake, Fish Lake Indian Reserve No. 7 at the south end of Cinquefoil Lake. and Quatlenemo Indian Reserve No. 5. All except Fish Lake IR 7, which is under the governance of the Lytton First Nation, are reserves of the Fountain First Nation.
