= Union Bar First Nation =

First Nation in British Colombia

Union Bar First Nation (Halkomelem: Iwówes) is a band government of the Sto:lo people, located near Hope, British Columbia.

== Demographics ==
Number of Band Members: 141
