= Penticton Indian Band =

First Nation government in British Columbia, Canada

The Penticton Indian Band (Okanagan: Sn̓pin̓tktn̓) is a First Nations government in the Canadian province of British Columbia, located next to the city of Penticton in the Okanagan Valley. They are a member of the Okanagan Nation Alliance. It has an accredited High School and Elementary school.

== Indian Reserves ==
Indian Reserves under the administration of the band are:

- Penticton Indian Reserve No. 1, at the south end of Okanagan Lake, 18539.80 ha.
- Penticton Indian Reserve No. 2, between Okanagan and Dog (Skaha) Lakes, 13.10 ha.
- Penticton Indian Reserve No. 3A, west of and adjoining IR No. 1, 5 miles southwest of Summerland, 145.70 ha.

== See also ==
- Okanagan people
