= Okanagan Indian Band =

First Nation government in British Columbia, Canada

The Okanagan Indian Band (Okanagan: N̓k̓maplqs) is a First Nations government in the Canadian province of British Columbia, located in the city of Vernon in the northern Okanagan Valley. The band is a member government of the Okanagan Nation Alliance.

Chief and Council (2023–2025) Chief: Byron Louis. Members of Council: Allan Louis, Val Chiba, Tim Isaac, Rachel Marchand, Mary Jack, Rochelle Saddleman, Viola Brown-Peoples, Donna Goodwater, Floyd Oppenheimer, Raymond Marchand.

Current Chief and Council (2025-2027) Chief: Dan Wilson. members of council: Viola Brown, Monica Louis, Allan Louis, Margaret Joe, David Marchand, Sarah Alexis, Timothy Isaac, Jenelle Renee Brewer, Hubert Marchand, Mary Jack.

== Population ==
As of March 2026, the Okanagan Indian Band has a total population 2,584

== Indian Reserves ==
Indian Reserves under the administration of the band are:

- Duck Lake Indian Reserve No. 7, on the north shore of Ellison Lake and on the banks of Vernon Creek, 179.10 ha.50°00′00″N 119°24′00″W
- Harris Indian Reserve No. 3, two miles southeast of Otter Lake, 64.80 ha.50°23′00″N 119°14′00″W
- Okanagan Indian Reserve No. 1, in the Okanagan Valley between Okanagan Lake and the Salmon River, 10302 ha.50°21′00″N 119°19′00″W
- Otter Lake Indian Reserve No. 2, at the south end of Otter Lake, nine miles north of Vernon, 25 ha.50°24′00″N 119°15′00″W
- Priest's Valley Indian Reserve No. 6, on Vernon Creek at its mouth on the east side of Okanagan Lake, southwest of Vernon, 33.60 ha.50°15′00″N 119°20′00″W
- Swan Lake Indian Reserve No. 4, on the north shore of Swan Lake, 32.20 ha.50°20′16″N 119°15′32″W

== Environmental problems ==
Unexploded ordnance (UXO) has littered OKIB land at Madeline Lake and Goose Lake since the Boer War in 1906. Canadian soldiers were trained to fire "live mortars, grenades and other munitions, including white phosphorus". In 2014, over 70 years old live mortars were found; a clean up agreement specifies that beginning in 2015 ten band members will be trained to become UXO technicians.

== Recent history ==
On February 22, 2010 the Okanagan Indian Band began blockading Tolko Industries Ltd.'s access to the Browns Creek watershed to protest logging. The blockade is supported by the Union of BC Indian Chiefs.

In 2014, OKIB requested that the defunct Kelowna Pacific Railway be returned to the band.

White Rock Lake Wildfire: In the summer of 2021, the Okanagan Indian band was affected by the White Rock Lake wildfire which spanned 833 kilometers, losing 10 homes and one business.

Komasket Arbor: In May 2022, the Okanagan Indian Band celebrate the reopening of their newly refurbished arbor located at Komasket park, replacing the original arbor built in the 1980s.

First Annual Komasket Powwow - In June 2023, Okanagan Indian Band hosted the first annual Komasket Powwow in honor of twi Kel-Ta-Muka, the late Emery Robins Sr. who played an essential role in bringing powwows to the OKIB community in the 1980s. This was the first powwow held in the newly reconstructed arbor, and the first in the OKIB community in several years.

In 2023, OKIB held a ground breaking ceremony for a new Cultural Immersion School underway. – nk̓maplqs iʔ snm̓am̓ay̓ʔtn iʔ k̓l sqilxʷtət. The immersion was founded in September of 2006, with the intent of cultivating a sense of cultural identity and language revitalization for generation to come. A brand new facility scheduled for completion for the 2025 school year. The new facility will be a positive place for students to learn their language, culture and traditions. A sense of pride for both the leadership and community.

== See also ==
- Okanagan people
