= Fountain, British Columbia =

Coordinates: 50°45′00″N 121°53′00″W

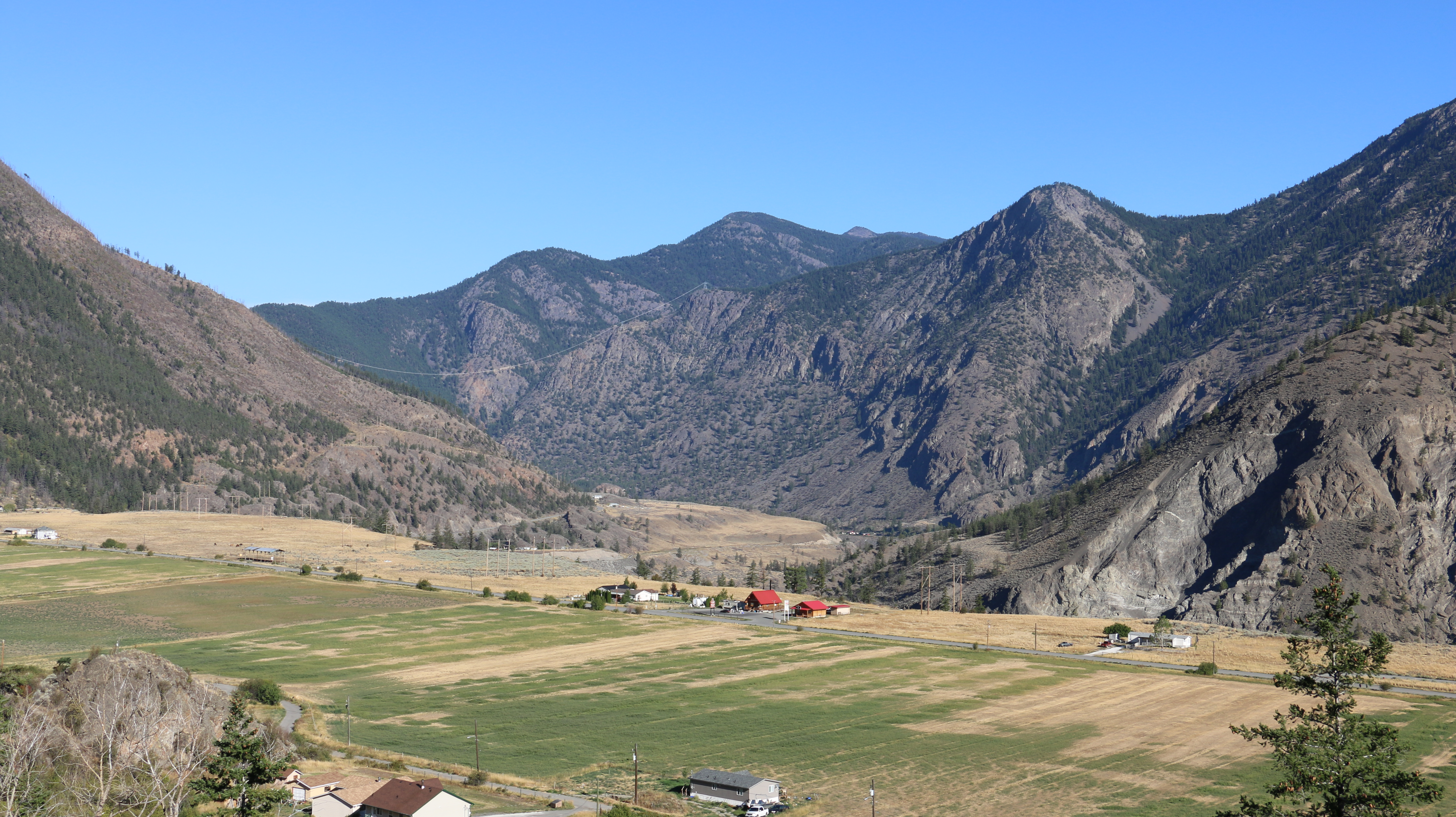
Highway 99 and Fountain

Fountain is an unincorporated rural area and Indian reserve community in the Fraser Canyon region of British Columbia, Canada, located at the ten-mile (16 km) mark from the town of Lillooet on BC Highway 99, which in that area is also on the route of the Old Cariboo Road and is located at the junction of that route with the old gold rush-era trail via Fountain Valley and the Fountain Lakes.

== Name ==
The name of the Fountain area in the St'at'imcets language is Cacli'p, also spelled Xaxli'p.

In gold rush times, today's Fountain was known as the Upper Fountain while the nearby Six Mile Rapids, just downstream at the confluence of the Fraser and Bridge Rivers, was known as the Lower Fountain, and the two together were known as "The Fountains", although this term was usually used to refer to the Upper Fountain only and over time was shortened to the singular form used today; another variant La Fountain is fairly common in older sources. The term is a reference to the foaming rapids on the Fraser at these locations, particularly the Lower Fountain where at high water the Fraser gushes through narrow rock ledges, leading to the comparison to a fountain. In a few early maps, the Bridge River appears as Rivière du Font because of this (or as a fortuitous misspelling of Rivière du Pont, in reference to an old aboriginal pole-bridge across the river there).

== Geography ==
Fountain lies at the southern apex of a double-horseshoe bend in the Fraser Canyon formed by the meeting of the Fraser and Yalakom Faults. This fault convergence also created Fountain Ridge, which lies immediately above the community and forms a natural wall between it and the town of Lillooet, which lies a few miles south of the northward bend just downstream from Fountain. Fountain Ridge forms the west flank of Fountain Valley while its east flank comprises the western lip of the plateau-like Clear Range; the flattish peak overlooking Fountain proper is Chipuin Mountain ("round", a reference to its dome-like shape).. The Fraser Canyon in this area is a mix of sand and rock gorge flanked by benchland formed from ancient lake bottoms, with the benchlands hundreds of feet above the river. Fountain is partly located on one of these benchlands. The climate is quite dry, with summer temperatures reputedly hotter than nearby Lillooet which vies with neighbouring Lytton for the title of "Canada's Hot Spot". Located at a higher elevation than Lillooet and exposed to the north and under the shadows of Fountain Ridge and the Clear Range, Fountain is considerably colder in winter. Natural vegetation in the area includes sagebrush and cactus verging into mixed coniferous forest (mostly pine at lower elevations).

== History ==
The Fountain area has been inhabited since the retreat of the glaciers (in this area the Fraser Glacier); archeological digs in the area, focussing on quiggly hole (kekuli) "towns", date back thousands of years. The most important of the sites and one of the oldest in BC is at Keatley Creek Archaeological Site, near Fountain between Glen Fraser and Pavilion. During the site's heyday the Fraser had been dammed by a landslide near Texas Creek, several miles below Lillooet and a lake stretched up what is now the Fraser Canyon past Pavilion, with the kekuli village situated near its shores, but today high on a semi-desert mountainside.

The main bench at the intersection of the Fountain Valley Road with Highway 99 was homesteaded in the mid-19th Century by Joseph L'Italienne, also known as Joseph Italian, who started a successful vineyard, which was British Columbia's first. He sold the land, a 160-acre (0.65 km^{2}) holding, to Chief Tsil.húsalst and several other members of the Fountain Band in 1883; it is now Indian reserve.

== First Nation ==
The band government whose reserves are focussed around Fountain is the Xaxli'p First Nation, officially styled simply "Xaxli'p". The Fountain Band's traditional name for the place is Cacli'p (in the now-standard Van Eijk orthography – - Xaxli'p is an older spelling system).

== See also ==
- Pavilion, British Columbia
- Fountain First Nation
- River Trail (British Columbia)
- Cacli'p
- Gibbs Creek Trestle
