= Xaxliʼp First Nation =

Stʼatʼimc band government in British Columbia, Canada

Xaxliʼp
- Band No. 592
- xáxl̓ǝpamx
- People: Stʼatʼimc
- Headquarters: Lillooet
- Province: British Columbia

Land
- Main reserve: Fountain 1
- Reserves: List: Chilhil 6; Dry Salmon 7; Fountain 1A, 1B, 1C, 1D, 2, 3, 3A, 4, 9, 10, 11, 12; Fountain Creek 8; Quatlenemo 5
- Land area: 15.81 km^{2} (6.10 sq mi)

Population (2025)
- On reserve: 258
- On other land: 144
- Off reserve: 736
- Total population: 1138

Government
- Chief: Darrell Bob Sr.

Tribal Council
- Lillooet Tribal Council

Website
- xaxlip.ca

Xaxliʼp, (Lillooet: xáxl̓ǝpamx) also known as the Fountain or the Fountain Indian Band, is a First Nations government located in the Central Interior-Fraser Canyon region of the Canadian province of British Columbia. It is a member of the Lillooet Tribal Council, which is the largest grouping of band governments of the Stʼatʼimc people (aka the Lillooet people).

The offices of the Xaxliʼp band government are located at Fountain, about 10 miles up the Fraser Canyon from the town of Lillooet. Fountain is known in the Stʼatʼimcets language as Cáclʼep or Xaxliʼp.

== Chief and Councillors ==
The Chief is Colleen Jacob and Councillors are Chester Alec, Bernard John, Shonna Jacob, Rena Joseph, Curtis Joseph, and Pauline Michell.

== Treaty process ==
The Xaxli'p entered the British Columbia Treaty Process in December 1993. The parties signed a framework agreement (stage 3 of the six-stage process) in November 1997.

They focused on internal research, including substantial work on a traditional use study and an ecosystem-based plan for their territory. They resumed negotiations in July 2000, and the parties worked towards interim agreements, including a water quality study and a community forest pilot agreement. In March 2001, the Xaxli'p left the negotiating table, according to the provincial government.

== History ==
Xaxl'ip Chief Thomas Adolph signed the Declaration of the Lillooet Tribe and travelled to Ottawa to express grievances over land rights as a member of the 1916 delegation of the newly formed Indian Rights Association.

== Demographics ==
The registered population of the Xaxli'pemc (people of Xaxli'p) in 2013 was 1,004, 609 of whom live off-reserve. Of the on-reserve population in 2006, the median age for males was 28.7 versus 39.5 for females.

== See also ==
- Roger Adolph
