= Okanagan Nation Alliance =

First Nations Tribal Council in British Columbia, Canada

The Okanagan Nation Alliance is a First Nations tribal council in the Canadian province of British Columbia, spanning the Nicola, Okanagan and Similkameen Districts of the Canadian province of British Columbia and also the Colville Indian Reservation in Washington state of the United States of America. Their territory covers roughly 69,000 km^{2} in the Canadian Province of British Columbia and also some area of Washington state in the United States of America. The diverse landscape covers deserts, lakes, forests, and grasslands.

The people of the seven tribes all have ties to the Syilx tribe whose ancestral territory spanned British Columbia as well as Washington state. The Syilx have their own spoken language, nsyilxcən, which is considered to be endangered, due to the small number of fluent speakers living today. It is a Salishan language and its use declined severely after assimilation due to colonization in the 19th century.

The Alliance consists of seven different bands spanning across British Columbia as well as some of Washington. The alliance is tied among the Okanagan Indian Band, the Westbank First Nation, the Lower Similkameen Indian Band, the Upper Similkameen Indian Band, the Osoyoos Indian Band, the Penticton Indian Band, the Upper Nicola Indian Band, and the Colville Confederated Tribes.

== History ==
The people of the Okanagan Nation Alliance refer to themselves as Syilx Okanagan people and have been around since pre-contact with Europeans. The Syilx Okanagan lived in a self-reliant, economically stable civilization before contact, and hunted, fished, gathered, and grew across their entire territory, creating a sustainable economy that was self-sufficient for the people pre-contact.

Colonization in the 1800s resulted in the Syilx Okanagan lands to be split by the creation of the 49th parallel and the formation of the Canadian-U.S. border in 1846. This border split the tribe in both a geographical and legal manner. Seven of the eight tribes remained in the north in Canada, but the Colville Confederated Tribes, whose lands cover Washington state in the U.S. were separated from their Syilx people.

Between 1877 and 1893 the Joint Indian Reserve Commission allotted several different tracks of land to which the Syilx Okanagan people would have reservations. These reservations were changed, land size decreased, and all done without the consent of the Syilx Okanagan. The natives of British Columbia would not stand being forced onto smaller reservation lands in comparison to their vast ancestral lands.

In 1910, interior tribes gathered to sign the Sir Wilfrid Laurier Memorial Declaration in hope to regain certain land rights and dispute the rights of First Nation peoples as a whole. Indian peoples were able to live on their reservations for many years, but in 1969, reservations were under political attack by Canada, when they sought to obtain reservation lands in the hopes to assimilate all First Nation peoples with their White-Paper policy. This policy did not take hold, and tribes retained their reservation lands.

In 1987, the Okanagan Nation Alliance adopted and signed their first legal declaration, written in English as well as their own Syilx language. The document was signed by all chiefs and council members of the eight tribes and ends with the promise to protect the Earth and its resources forever.

== Education ==
The Okanagan Nation Alliance offers several education programs at the University of British Columbia Okanagan. This university was founded in partnership with the Syilx Okanagan people in September 2005. It offers several different degrees under nine different programs: Arts and Social Sciences, Creative and Critical Studies, Education, Engineering, Health and Social Development, Management, Medicine, Science, and Graduate Studies. The Graduate program allows students to develop their own path and find their own unique research opportunities. One unique aspect of UBC Okanagan is that the ancestral language of the Okanagan people is taught on campus, allowing the language to be passed onto future generations.

== Governance ==
The alliance is overseen by each of the bands' current chiefs. They are known as the Chief Executive Council or CEC. The purpose of the CEC is to assert Syilx Okanagan Nation Sovereignty as well as to address the interests of the people. The current elected leader of the CEC is the Osoyoos band chief, Clarence Louie. The CEC generally meets each month for a standard meeting, but in July, each year, they meet for their annual general assembly meeting.

== Syilx Nation Rising! ==
A recent revitalization of Syilx culture, language, and land rights occurred in 2018. The chief executive of the Okanagan Nation Alliance called for this revitalization across all the bands included in the alliance. This was a call to action for all Syilx people to band together in order to form a constitution in order to preserve the Syilx ways as well as legitimize their changes in government systems. It would also protect the territory of the Syilx people without having a constant battle with the Canadian government. This advocacy has been coined by the people as Syilx Nation Rising! Several members of the nation were encouraged to make videos, messages, or just share their voice in support of the revitalization of Syilx culture.

== Food ==
The most central food to the ancient Syilx people was the sockeye salmon. European colonization and overfishing drastically reduced the population of the species in the Okanagan valley, and there have been extreme efforts to improve the population of the salmon since 1990. As such, the indigenous people of the Okanagan valley have sought food sovereignty from the poor market food provided to them since the species' decline. The decline in the population of traditional food sources sparked support for revitalization of traditional cultural responsibilities to their lands, waters, as well as their food resources. To the Syilx, Salmon is more than just food, it was a relative that connected their people from generation to generation. The salmon is central to the Okanagan Valley ecosystem, and the Syilx people strive to keep its population abundant.

== Member governments ==
- Okanagan Nation Alliance
  - Westbank First Nation (West Kelowna)
  - Lower Similkameen Indian Band (in Keremeos)
  - Upper Similkameen Indian Band (in Princeton)
  - Osoyoos Indian Band
  - Penticton Indian Band
  - Okanagan Indian Band (in Vernon)
  - Upper Nicola Indian Band (near Merritt) - also part of the Nicola Tribal Association
  - Colville Confederated Tribes

== Alliance Tribes/Bands ==
=== Okanagan Indian Band ===
The Okanagan Indian Band's lands cover 11,282 hectares of reserve land and consist of seven reservations. The lands are located in British Columbia and is the most Northern of the bands in the Okanagan Nation Alliance. Currently, there are roughly 2,030 enrolled members of the band and the current chief of the Okanagan is Byron Louis.

=== Westbank First Nation ===
The Westbank First Nation's lands cover 5,340 acres of reserve land and consist of five reservations. Located in British Columbia, they border the Okanagan band to the North. Currently the Nation has about 855 enrolled members and the current chief of the Nation is Christopher Derickson.

=== Lower Similkameen Indian Band ===
The Lower Similkameen Indian Band's lands cover approximately 15,048 hectares of reserve land and consist of eleven reservations. They are located in the region of British Columbia and cover the area of Keremeos. The current enrolled member count is about 500 and the current chief of the band is Keith Crow.

=== Upper Similkameen Indian Band ===
The Upper Similkameen Indian Band's lands cover roughly 2726 hectares of reserve land and consist of eight reservations. They are located in the Similkameen Valley north of the Canada-U.S. border. There are currently about 200 enrolled members in the band and the current chief is Bonnie Jacobsen.

=== Osoyoos Indian Band ===
The Osoyoos Indian Band's lands cover about 32,000 acres covering a single Osoyoos reservation. They are located in the region of British Columbia and are located just north of the Canada-U.S. border. There are currently about 600 enrolled members in the band and the current chief is Clarence Louie.

=== Penticton Indian Band ===
The Penticton Indian Band's lands cover about 46,000 acres and consist of three reservations. They are located directly west of the Okanagan band and reside in the southern part of the Okanagan Valley in the region of British Columbia. There are currently 922 enrolled members in the band and the current chief is Greg Gabriel.

=== Upper Nicola Indian Band ===
The Upper Nicola Indian Band's lands cover roughly 30,848 acres of reserve land and consist of eight reservations. They are located in the Nicola Valley in the region of British Columbia. They are the only Syilx Okanagan tribe in the Nicola Valley. There are currently 980 enrolled members in the band and the current chief is Harvey McLeod.

=== Colville Confederated Tribes ===
The Colville Confederated Tribes' lands cover 2.83 million acres of reserve land and consist of a single reservation. They are the only Syilx Okanagan people to be located in the United States, specifically Washington State. There are currently 9,520 enrolled members within the tribes and the chairman of the confederated tribes is Andrew Joseph Jr.

== Okanagan Nation Declarations ==
The Okanagan Nation Alliance has five declarations:

1. 1981 - Okanagan Nation Declaration
2. 2010 - Unity Declaration
3. 2014 - Water Declaration
4. 2018 - Syilx Okanagan Language Declaration
5. 2022 - Okanagan Family Declaration

== See also ==
- Okanagan people
- List of tribal councils in British Columbia

== Bibliography ==
- "Syilx Okanagan Nation". Okanagan Nation Alliance, https://www.syilx.org/about-us/syilx-nation/
- "Timeline". Okanagan Nation Alliance, https://www.syilx.org/about-us/syilx-nation/timeline/#top2.
- Christian, Dorothy (31 December 1994). "Crisis averted with Okanagan Nation". News from Indian Country. Hayward, Wisconsin. ProQuest 367674774.
- History & milestones. UBC's Okanagan Campus. (2022, May 27). Retrieved May 31, 2022, from https://ok.ubc.ca/about/history-and-milestones/
- Academics. UBC's Okanagan Campus. (2020, August 5). Retrieved May 31, 2022, from https://ok.ubc.ca/academics/
- Chief executive council. Okanagan Nation Alliance. (n.d.). Retrieved May 31, 2022, from https://www.syilx.org/governance/chief-executive-council/
- Syilx Nation rising! Okanagan Nation Alliance. (n.d.). Retrieved May 31, 2022, from https://www.syilx.org/syilxnationrising
- Blanchet, Rosanne; Willows, Noreen; Johnson, Suzanne; Batal, Malek; Batal, M (February 2022). "Enhancing cultural food security among the Syilx Okanagan adults with the reintroduction of Okanagan sockeye salmon". Applied Physiology, Nutrition, and Metabolism. 47 (2): 124–133. doi:10.1139/apnm-2021-0321. hdl:1807/109721. PMID 34807751. S2CID 244489820.
- Okanagan Indian Band, https://okib.ca/.
- "Discover WFN". Westbank First Nation, https://www.wfn.ca/.
- "Lower Similkameen Indian Band – Smelqmix". Lower Similkameen Indian Band Smelqmix, https://www.lsib.net/.
- Bigbear. "Upper Similkameen Indian Band (USIB), Hedley BC". Upper Similkameen Indian Band, 27 May 2021, https://usib.ca/.
- "Home". OIB 2018, http://oib.ca/.
- Penticton Indian Band, http://pib.ca/.
- Upper Nicola Band, https://uppernicola.com/.
- "Colville Tribes". Colville Tribes, https://www.colvilletribes.com/.
