= Sea Bird Island (British Columbia) =

Island in British Columbia, Canada

Coordinates: 49°16′00″N 121°43′00″W

Sea Bird Island is an island in the Fraser River just east of Agassiz, British Columbia, Canada, in the Upper Fraser Valley region of that province, about 75 miles east of Vancouver. Though within the District of Kent, most of the island is part of the Seabird Island Indian reserve and is the community of the Seabird Island First Nation, a member government of the Sto:lo Tribal Council.

== Name ==
The name is derived from the Sea Bird, one of the first steamboats to operate on the Fraser during the Fraser Canyon Gold Rush of 1858–1860. First gazetted in 1930 as Seabird Island, the name was changed in 1967 to Sea Bird Island.
