= South Okanagan—Similkameen National Park Reserve =

Proposed national park reserve in British Columbia, Canada

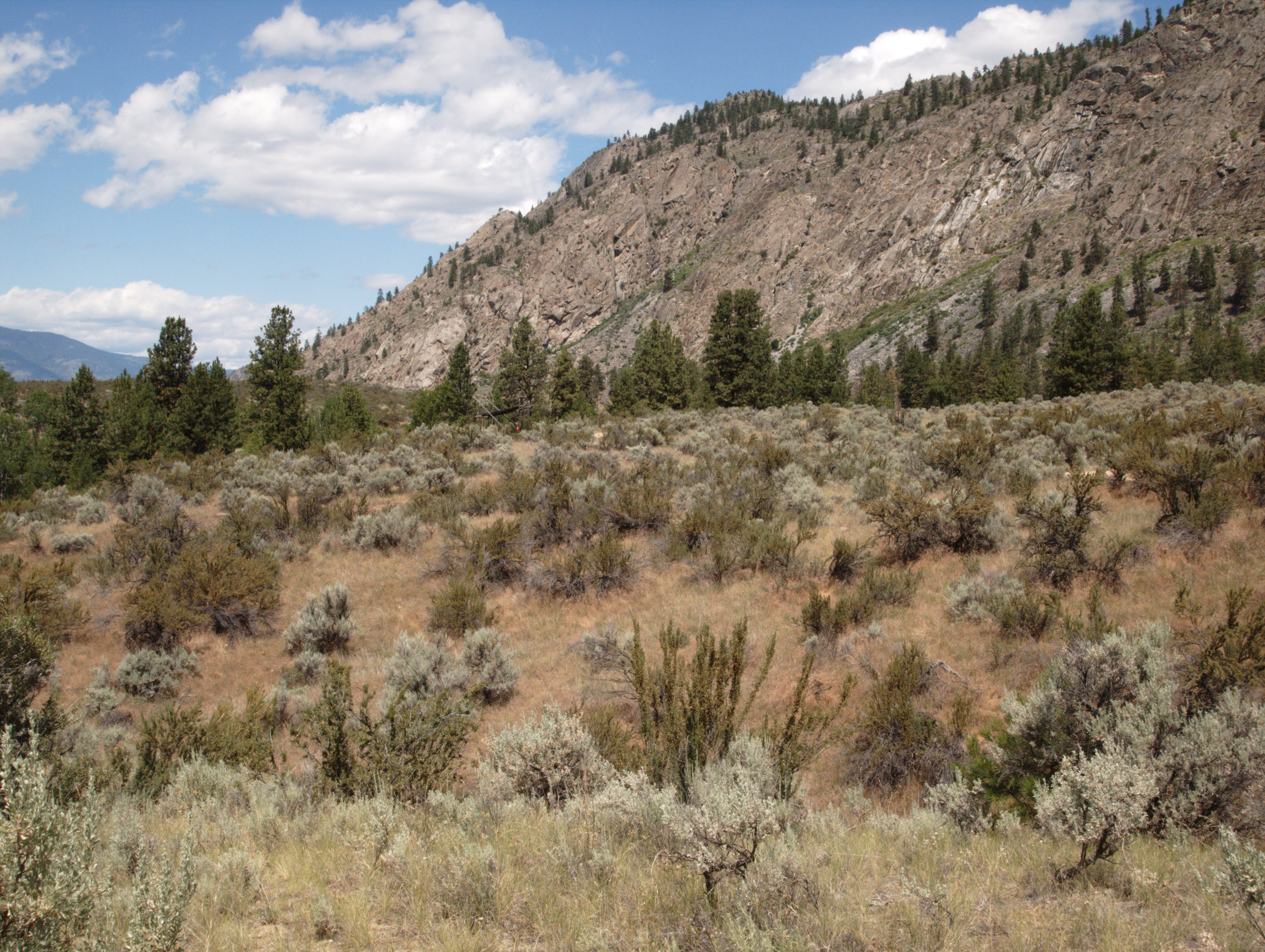
- Dry forest-shrubland transition near Osoyoos

- Location within Canada Location within British Columbia
- Location: Okanagan-Similkameen, British Columbia
- Nearest city: Oliver, Osoyoos
- Coordinates: 49°05′49″N 119°37′49″W
- Area: 27,300 hectares (67,000 acres)
- Designation: Proposed National Park Reserve
- Website: Proposed National Park Reserve in the South Okanagan-Similkameen

South Okanagan—Similkameen National Park Reserve is a proposed national park reserve in the Regional District of Okanagan-Similkameen of British Columbia. The goal of the park is to work with the local First Nations to protect a large patch of Okanagan dry forests and part of the northern reach of the Columbia Plateau ecoregion in Canada.

"South Okanagan—Similkameen" is the working name of the proposed national park reserve. Once plans are finalized, the park will be given a formal name.

== Setting ==
The South Okanagan region is home to the only semi-arid shrubland ecosystem in Canada. The ecosystem is dominated by Antelope-brush and is a habitat for 30% of the Red-listed and 46% of the Blue-listed vertebrates in British Columbia, several of which are listed as threatened or endangered. More than 24 invertebrates exist only in this ecoregion, with an additional 80 species occurring nowhere else in Canada.

== History ==
=== Early protection efforts ===
In 1991, the Osoyoos Desert Society was founded with the goal of protecting this unique ecosystem. As part of its conservation efforts, the society constructed the Osoyoos Desert Center, an interpretive centre with the goal of spreading awareness of the region's unique ecology and promote conservation.

On 18 April 2001, BC Parks established the 9,364 ha (23,140 acres) South Okanagan Grasslands Protected Area to protect the semi-arid forests and grasslands of the region.

=== Parks Canada proposal ===
In 2003, Parks Canada and the Government of British Columbia began formally assessing the viability of a national park reserve in the South Okanagan. In 2006, Parks Canada drafted a park concept of 65,000 hectares (160,000 acres) in cooperation with the Government of British Columbia and local residents. The same year, the Osoyoos Indian Band of the Okanagan Nation Alliance constructed the Nk'Mip Desert Cultural Centre with the goal of showcasing the cultural heritage of the Okanagan people and promoting conservation efforts in the region.

In 2010, the proposed park was revised down to 28,400 hectares (70,000 acres) with a greater emphasis placed on protecting lower elevation grasslands where species diversity is highest and most at risk.

=== Memorandum of understanding ===
On 3 July 2019, Parks Canada and the Okanagan Nation Alliance signed a memorandum of understanding to formally work toward establishing a national park reserve in the South Okanagan-Similkameen. As of this memorandum, the park reserve encompasses an area of 27,300 hectares (67,000 acres) stretching from the southern slopes of Orofino Mountain to the Canada–United States border. In addition, the park reserve would absorb the existing protected areas of South Okanagan Grasslands and Field's Lease.

With the onset of the COVID-19 pandemic in Canada in early 2020, progress in reaching an establishment agreement between senior governments and local First Nations slowed significantly. As of August 2021, negotiations are ongoing.

== See also ==
- List of national parks of Canada
- Thaidene Nëné National Park Reserve
