= Merry Xmas (film) =

2015 short film

- Directed by: Boman Modine
- Written by: Boman Modine; Matthew Modine
- Produced by: Joe d'Angerio; Matthew Modine; Adam Rackoff
- Starring: Dick Van Dyke; Valerie Harper; Glenne Headly; Matthew Modine
- Cinematography: Sara Garth
- Edited by: Albert Ruis
- Music by: Juano Lippi; Kevin MacLeod; Ben Wolfe
- Distributed by: ShortsTV
- Release date: April 19, 2015 (Tribeca)
- Running time: 7 minutes
- Country: United States
- Language: English

Merry Xmas is a 2015 American short film directed by Boman Modine and produced by Cinco Dedos Peliculas LLC. The comedic film had its world premiere at the 2015 Tribeca Film Festival in New York City. In June, the short won the Best "Pilot" Award at the 2015 New Media Film Festival in Los Angeles. During Michael Moore's Traverse City Film Festival, the film screened before a work-in-progress cut of Jen Senko's political documentary, The Brainwashing of My Dad, also produced by Matthew Modine and Adam Rackoff. On August 1, 2015, director Boman Modine and co-producer Adam Rackoff were invited to participate in the "After the Credits" interview series where they discussed the process of casting, shooting, and directing Merry Xmas.

On December 11, 2015, it was announced that Merry Xmas closed a deal with Shorts International, the parent company of ShortsHD, to release the film on a variety of digital EST platforms including iTunes Movies, Google Play, Amazon Video, and Verizon. During Christmas week, Merry Xmas was featured on the iTunes Short Films page and landed in the top ten sales chart. Of the top ten films, Merry Xmas was the only live-action film and the only short not produced by Disney or DreamWorks.

== Story ==
Merry Xmas tells the story of a mischievous father (Dick Van Dyke) who calls his very busy kids (Matthew Modine and Glenne Headly) to tell them that after 55 years of marriage, he and their mom (Valerie Harper) are getting divorced. Horrified by the news, the children prepare to fly home to stop the divorce and save their parent's marriage. It is revealed at the end that the father lied to get the kids to visit on Christmas and pay their own money to travel over. Both he and his wife dance during the credits

== Film festivals ==
Festival	Status	Screening Dates	Awards/Accolades	Filmmakers In Attendance
Tribeca Film Festival	World Premiere	April 19, 20, 23, and 24, 2015	Selected to participate in the Tribeca Presents Channel on United Airlines in December.	Boman Modine, Joe d’Angerio, Adam Rackoff, Sara Garth
Seattle International Film Festival	West Coast Premiere	May 22, 2015	Selected to participate in the Starbucks Digital Network during the festival (May 21–24, 2015).	
New Media Film Festival	Los Angeles Premiere	June 9, 2015	Winner, Best Short "Pilot" Award	Boman Modine
Traverse City Film Festival	Michigan Premiere	July 29 and August 1, 2015	Official Selection	Boman Modine and Adam Rackoff
Tumbleweed Film Festival	Washington Premiere	July 30, 2015	Official Selection	
Oldenburg International Film Festival	International Premiere	September 16–20, 2015	Official Selection	Boman Modine
Calabasas Film Festival		September 17–20, 2015	Official Selection	
Long Beach International Film Festival		September 24–27, 2015	Official Selection	
Edmonton International Film Festival	Canadian Premiere	October 7, 2015 (as part of Lunchbox Shorts)	Official Selection	
Tacoma Film Festival		October 8–15, 2015	Official Selection	
15 Short Film Festival	North Carolina Premiere	October 11, 2015	Official Selection	
Dallas VideoFest	Texas Premiere	October 16, 2015	Official Selection	Matthew Modine
Petaluma International Film Festival		October 16–18, 2015	Official Selection	
Carmel International Film Festival		October 21–25, 2015	Official Selection	Boman Modine
Washington West Film Festival	Virginia Premiere	October 23 and 24 (as part of Shorts Program Two: Saying Goodbye) and October 24 (before the Ed Asner documentary, My Friend Ed)	Official Selection	Adam Rackoff
Naples International Film Festival	Florida Premiere	November 5–8, 2015	Official Selection	
YESfest	Indiana Premiere	November 6–8, 2015	Official Selection	
Alexandria Film Festival		November 7, 2015	Official Selection	Adam Rackoff
Rehoboth Beach Independent Film Festival	Delaware Premiere	November 11–15, 2015	Official Selection	
SHORT CUTS Short Film Series	Connecticut Premiere	November 18, 2015	Official Selection	Adam Rackoff
Anchorage International Film Festival	Alaska Premiere	December 4–13, 2015	Jury’s Selection Reel	
FilmLab Festival	Italian Premiere	October 13–16th, 2016	Official Selection	

== See also ==
- List of Christmas films
