= List of nature centres in Canada =

This is a list of nature centres and environmental education centres in Canada.

== Alberta ==
Name	Location	Region	Summary
Beaverhill Lake Nature Centre	Tofield	Central Alberta	website, operated by the Town, features natural history exhibits, information on area birding opportunities
Boreal Centre for Bird Conservation	Slave Lake	Northern Alberta	Located in Lesser Slave Lake Provincial Park, indoor and outdoor exhibits, programs, education and study center of boreal birds on their breeding grounds
Bow Habitat Station	Calgary	Calgary Region	website, operated by the Alberta Environment and Sustainable Resources Department in 21 hectares Pearce Estate Park, features aquariums, fish hatchery, trout pond, hands-on exhibits
Helen Schuler Nature Centre	Lethbridge	Southern Alberta	website, operated by the City, 196-acre Lethbridge Nature Reserve, part of the Oldman River valley parks system
Inglewood Bird Sanctuary and Nature Centre	Calgary	Calgary Region	website, operated by the City, 36-hectare wildlife reserve
John Janzen Nature Centre	Edmonton	Edmonton Capital Region	website, operated by the City
Kerry Wood Nature Center	Red Deer	Central Alberta	website, operated by the Waskasoo Environmental Education Society, adjacent to Gaetz Lakes Sanctuary, a municipally owned 118-hectare park and federal migratory bird sanctuary
Kimiwan Lake Interpretive Centre	McLennan	Northern Alberta	website, operated by Kimiwan Lake Naturalists, open seasonally
Police Point Park Nature Centre	Medicine Hat	Southern Alberta	website, managed by the Society of Grasslands Naturalists in the municipal 97.7 hectares (241.43 acres) natural reserve

== British Columbia ==
Name	Location	Region	Summary
Allan Brooks Nature Centre	Vernon	North Okanagan	website, open seasonally, named after area naturalist Allan Brooks
Buck Creek Canfor Hatchery & Nature Centre	Houston	Northern BC	Small salmon hatchery and nature centre, operated by A Rocha Canada.
Creston Valley Wildlife Management Area	Creston	Central Kootenay	7,000-hectares (17,000 acres), Wildlife Interpretation Centre open seasonally
Goldstream Nature House	Langford	Capital	Seasonal programs, located in the 477-hectare Goldstream Provincial Park and operated by RLC Park Services
Gorge Waterway Nature House	Esquimalt	Capital	Located in Esquimalt Gorge Park. Seasonal programs, displays about local ecosystems. Operated by the Gorge Waterway Action Society.
Great Blue Heron Nature Reserve	Chilliwack	Fraser Valley	website, 130 hectares (325 acres), features Rotary Interpretive Centre
Iris Griffith Centre, Ruby Lake Lagoon	Madeira Park	Sunshine Coast	website, operated by the Ruby Lake Lagoon Society, displays about human interaction with the natural environment from the mountains down to the sea
Lynn Canyon Ecology Centre	North Vancouver	Metro Vancouver	Located in 617-acre (250 ha) Lynn Canyon Park, features natural history museum and education programs
Miracle Beach Nature House	Campbell River	Strathcona	Seasonal programs, located in the 137-hectare Miracle Beach Provincial Park and operated by RLC Park Services
Morrell Nature Sanctuary	Nanaimo	Nanaimo	website, 111 hectares of preserved second growth forest with 11 kilometers of walking trails
Nk'mip Desert Cultural Centre	Osoyoos	Okanagan-Similkameen	Natural history of the Okanagan Desert and culture of the Osoyoos Indian Band
North Island Wildlife Recovery Centre	Errington	Nanaimo	website, wildlife rehabilitation facility specializing in raptors and black bear
Osoyoos Desert Centre	Osoyoos	Okanagan-Similkameen	Natural history of the Okanagan Desert, 67-acre nature interpretive facility, operated by the Osoyoos Desert Society
Rathtrevor Beach Nature House	Parksville	Nanaimo	Seasonal programs, located in the 347-hectare Rathtrevor Beach Provincial Park and operated by RLC Park Services
Richmond Nature Park	Richmond	Metro Vancouver	200 acres, includes the Nature House
Scout Island Nature House	Williams Lake	Cariboo	website, open seasonally
Stanley Park Nature House	Vancouver	Metro Vancouver	Operated by the Stanley Park Ecology Society, exhibits and programs about the park's natural history
Swan Lake Nature Sanctuary	Saanich	Capital	Features the Swan Lake Christmas Hill Nature House

== Manitoba ==
Name	Location	Region	Summary
FortWhyte Alive	Winnipeg	Winnipeg Capital Region	Website 640 acres, natural history exhibits and live animals, 70-acre bison prairie and viewing mound, over 7 km of interpretive trails, family treehouse
Living Prairie Museum	Winnipeg	Winnipeg Capital Region	12-hectare (30 acre) tall grass prairie preserve, displays on prairie history and ecology, operated by the City
Oak Hammock Marsh Interpretive Centre	Stonewall	Winnipeg Capital Region	36 km2 Wildlife Management Area
Riverbank Discovery Centre	Brandon	Westman Region	website, natural history of the Assiniboine River, tourism information

== New Brunswick ==
Name	Location	County	Summary
Cape Jourimain Nature Centre	Cape Jourimain	Westmorland	Natural history of the Northumberland Strait
Ducks Unlimited Conservation Centre	Fredericton	York	website, operated by Ducks Unlimited on the north banks of the Saint John River
Irving Eco-Centre	Bouctouche	Kent	website, operated by J. D. Irving, sand dune environment of La Dune de Bouctouche
Lamèque Eco-Parc	Lamèque	Gloucester	website (in French), open seasonally
Sunbury Shores Arts and Nature Centre	St, Andrews	Charlotte	website, art gallery, art and nature classes
Tantramar Wetlands Centre	Sackville	Westmorland	website, 15 hectares, community-based centre of wetlands education specializing in experiential programming aimed at public school students and teachers, focus is the Tantramar Marshes
Wild Salmon Nature Centre	St. Andrews	Charlotte	website, biology, research, issues affecting salmon, angling heritage and art, operated by the Atlantic Salmon Federation

== Newfoundland ==
Name	Location	Summary
The Fluvarium	St. John's	Operated by the Quidi Vidi/Rennie's River Development Foundation, natural history and environment of the river
Salmonier Nature Park	Holyrood	website, operated by the Province, 40 hectares with trails and animal displays, centre for environmental education, wildlife rehabilitation, research and environmental monitoring, additional undeveloped 1415 hectares

== Nova Scotia ==
Name	Location	Summary
Joggins Fossil Centre	Joggins	website, museum exhibits about the Joggins Fossil Cliffs, area coal mining, guided beach tours and programs
Natural Resources Education Centre	Middle Musquodoboit	website, operated by the Province, 80 hectares (120 acres), curriculum-based educational programs for schools and groups
Robie Tufts Nature Centre	Wolfville	website, operated by the Blomidon Naturalists Society, features structure for chimney swifts

== Ontario ==
Name	Location	Region	Summary
Apps' Mill Nature Centre	Brantford	Southwestern Ontario	website, operated by the Grand River Conservation Authority in the 107-hectare (266 acre) property of mature forest, fields and plantations; features the 1841 Apps' Flour and Grist Mill
Backus Mill Heritage and Conservation Centre	Port Rowan	Southwestern Ontario	1,240 acres, features late 18th century grist mill, conservation education centre and heritage village
Bronte Creek Provincial Park	Oakville	Southwestern Ontario	6.4-square-kilometre (2.5 sq mi) park, features nature centre, children's farm, early 20th century historic farmhouse museum
Ball's Falls Centre for Conservation	Ball's Falls	Southwestern Ontario	Natural and cultural history of the Niagara Escarpment and ghost town with restored buildings
Camp Kawartha Environment Centre	Peterborough (@ Trent University)	Central Ontario	Sustainable Living and Building, Regenerative/Nature Rich Landscaping Practices, Environmental & Nature Education (K-12 and Post Secondary), Educator, Parent and Community Training, Workshops, and Events.
Cooper Marsh Conservation Area	South Lancaster	Eastern Ontario	website, operated by the Raisin Region Conservation Authority, visitor center located on Lake Saint Francis
EcoHouse Green Venture	Hamilton	Golden Horseshoe	website, sustainable living environmental education demonstration centre operated by Green Venture
Giant Rib Discovery Centre	Dundas	Golden Horseshoe	Natural history of the Dundas Valley Conservation Area and the Niagara Escarpment
Gamiing Nature Centre	Lindsay	Central Ontario	100 acres, nature workshops and events about lake ecosystems
Guelph Lake Nature Centre	Guelph	Southwestern Ontario	Operated by the Grand River Conservation Authority in the 1608-hectare (3,971-acre) property of the Guelph Lake Conservation Area
Heartland Forest Nature Experience	Niagara Falls	Golden Horseshoe	website, 93 acres with 2.5 km of accessible trails
High Park	Toronto	Golden Horseshoe	161 hectares (400 acres) park, High Park Nature Centre serves as an educational centre for visitors to the Park
H. R. Frink Outdoor Education Centre	Plainfield	Central Ontario	website, Friend of the Frink Center, operated by the Hastings and Prince Edward District School Board in partnership with the Algonquin and Lakeshore Catholic District School Board on land owned by Quinte Conservation
Kortright Centre for Conservation	Vaughan	Greater Toronto Area	325 hectares, environmental and renewable energy education and demonstration centre, operated by the Toronto and Region Conservation Authority
Laurel Creek Nature Centre	Waterloo	Southwestern Ontario	website, operated by the Grand River Conservation Authority in the 47-hectare (120-acre) property
Ojibway Nature Center and Ojibway Park	Windsor	Southwestern Ontario	Operated by the Windsor Department of Parks, natural history of the Ojibway Prairie Complex
Presqu'ile Provincial Park	Brighton	Central Ontario	9.37 km2 (3.62 sq mi), features a nature centre and the Lighthouse Interpretive Centre
Rockwood Nature Centre	Rockwood	Southwestern Ontario	Open seasonally, operated by the Grand River Conservation Authority in Rockwood Park
Rouge Valley Conservation Centre	Toronto	Golden Horseshoe	Located in Rouge Park, environmental education programs and guided hikes in the park
Royal Botanical Gardens	Burlington	Golden Horseshoe	980 hectares (2,422 acres), includes an arboretum, herbarium, nature interpretive centre, network of over 37 km of trails and outdoor floral arrangements
Shade's Mill Nature Centre	Cambridge	Southwestern Ontario	website, operated by the Grand River Conservation Authority in the 177 hectares (437 acres) Shade's Mill Conservation Area
Taquanyah Nature Centre	Cayuga	Southern Ontario	website, operated by the Grand River Conservation Authority in the Taquanyah Conservation Area
Toronto Botanical Garden	Toronto	Golden Horseshoe	4 acres (2 ha), features 17 themed "city-sized gardens", environmental education programs
University of Guelph Arboretum	Guelph	Southwestern Ontario	165 hectares (410 acres), offers workshops, special events, includes the J.C. Taylor Centre
Upper Canada Migratory Bird Sanctuary	Morrisburg	Eastern Ontario	website, operated by the St. Lawrence Parks Commission, 9,000 hectares, interpretive centre with exhibits, environmental education programs
Wawanosh Nature Centre	Belgrave	Southwestern Ontario	website, operated by the Maitland Valley Conservation Authority in the Wawanosh Valley Conservation Area
Wye Marsh Wildlife Centre	Midland	Central Ontario	3,000 acres of wetlands, fen and forest, includes live animals, trails, canoeing and kayaking routes, an observation tower and boardwalks

== Prince Edward Island ==
Name	Location	County	Summary
Macphail Woods Nature Centre	Orwell	Queens	website, operated by the Macphail Woods Ecological Forestry Project

== Quebec ==
Name	Location	Region	Summary
Cap Tourmente National Wildlife Area	Saint-Joachim	Charlevoix	Critical habitat for the Greater Snow Goose during migration, encompasses 2400 hectares (24 km2) of marshes, wetlands, plains and forests
Centre d'interprétation de la nature du Lac Boivin	Granby	Montérégie	website (in French), 1,114 acres
Centre d'interprétation de la nature et marais Laperrière	Duhamel-Ouest	Abitibi-Témiscamingue	website (in French), open seasonally, natural history of the wetlands area
Maison Girard Interpretive Centre	L'Isle-Verte	Bas-Saint-Laurent	website (in French), natural history of the peat bogs and tidal marshes of the Baie de l'Isle-Verte
Saguenay Fjord National Park		Côte-Nord	Includes the Saguenay Fjord Interpretation Centre, Beluga Interpretation Centre and Maison des Dunes Interpretation Centre
Tadoussac Bird Observatory	Les Bergeronnes	Côte-Nord	website (in French), seasonal bird banding and migration observation in Saguenay Fjord National Park

== Saskatchewan ==
Name	Location	Census Division	Region	Summary
Battlefords Wildlife Federation Nature Centre	North Battleford	16	North Central	website
Beaver Creek Conservation Area	Saskatoon	11	Central	website, Meewasin Valley Interpretive Centre, operated by the Meewasin Valley Authority, features an uncultivated short grass prairie site
Chaplin Nature Centre	Chaplin	7	South Central	website, exhibits about shore birds, area brine shrimp and mining industry, bird migration
Foam Lake Visitor Centre and Nature Centre	Foam Lake	10	East Central	Natural history of the Quill Lakes, local tourism information
Prairie Learning Centre	Val Marie	4	South	Education programs about the natural history of Grasslands National Park
Prince Albert National Park of Canada Nature Centre	Waskesiu Lake	16	North Central	Natural history of the park and its significance in the family of national parks of Canada
Quill Lakes International Bird Area Interpretive Centre	Wynyard	10	East Central	Natural history of the Quill Lakes, local tourism information
Saskatchewan Burrowing Owl Interpretive Centre	Moose Jaw	7	South Central	website, conservation of the endangered burrowing owl and their prairie habitat, open seasonally
Wadena & District Museum & Nature Centre	Wadena	10	East Central	Facebook site, area pioneer heritage, railroad, natural history of the Quill Lakes, open seasonally

== See also ==
- List of nature centers in the United States
