= Okanagan Desert =

Semi-arid shrubland area in British Columbia, Canada

- Desert
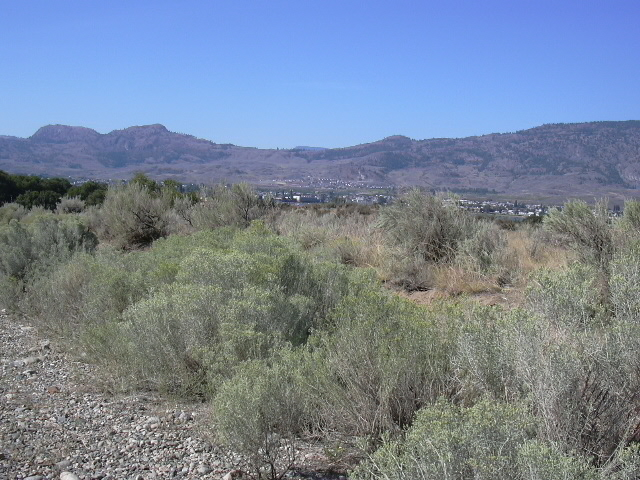
- Semi-arid shrubland east of Osoyoos
- Interactive map of Okanagan Desert
- Coordinates: 49°03′15″N 119°31′00″W
- Location: British Columbia and Washington
- Part of: Columbia Plateau (CEC); Okanagan dry forests (WWF)

The Okanagan Desert is the common name for a semi-arid shrubland located in the southern region of the Okanagan Valley in British Columbia and Washington. It is centred around the city of Osoyoos and is the only semi-arid shrubland in Canada. Part of this ecosystem is referred to as the Nk'mip Desert by the Osoyoos Indian Band.

The Thompson-Nicola Regional District further northwest in the Okanagan Valley around the city of Kamloops is also referred to as a desert region.

== Ecology ==
The Okanagan shrub-steppe is defined by the presence of an antelope-brush ecosystem containing several species of flora and fauna found nowhere else in Canada. This includes more than 300 species of birds, 7 species of snakes, and 14 species of bats. In regard to species found nowhere else in the world, there are more than 20 kinds of insects and spiders. The South Okanagan shrub-steppe ecosystem is a habitat for 30% of the Red-listed and 46% of the Blue-listed vertebrates in British Columbia, with several listed as threatened or endangered. More than 24 invertebrates exist only in the Okanagan Desert, with an additional 80 species occurring nowhere else in Canada.

According to the Commission for Environmental Cooperation (CEC), this region lies within the northern reach of the Columbia Plateau ecoregion (10.1.2). It is defined by a dry semi-arid climate and an ecosystem of mixed shrublands and grasslands largely devoid of trees. Heading north, ecoregion gradually transitions into the Thompson-Okanagan Plateau ecoregion (10.1.1) around the shores of Skaha Lake.

Using ecoregions defined by the World Wide Fund for Nature (WWF), this region lies within the northern reach of the Okanagan dry forests ecoregion, which is defined almost identically to that of the CEC's Columbia Plateau ecoregion in terms of climate and defining vegetation.

=== Flora ===
The Okanagan shrub-steppe is dominated by antelope brush and common rabbitbrush interspersed with a variety of flowering plant species. These include arrowleaf balsamroot, bitterroot, brittle pricklypear, sagebrush buttercup, and sagebrush mariposa lily.

=== Fauna ===
As of 2009, 23 species were Red-listed (threatened or extirpated) in the South Okanagan shrub-steppe ecosystem, including:

- burrowing owl
- western screech owl
- peregrine falcon
- sage grouse
- sage thrasher
- pallid bat
- western red bat
- badger
- tiger salamander
- western ridge mussel
- northern leopard frog

== Threats and preservation ==
Over the early 21st century, many fruit-tree orchards were converted to irrigated vineyards.

=== Local organizations ===
There are multiple groups or organizations located in the Okanagan Desert. The Osoyoos Band, a First Nations government located in British Columbia, runs the Nk'Mip Desert Cultural Centre as part of its resort and winery complex, which is located on the east side of Osoyoos. The Osoyoos Desert Society, a non-profit society founded in 1991, maintains the Osoyoos Desert Centre, a 67-acre nature interpretive facility 3 km (2 mi) north of Osoyoos off Highway 97. The Osoyoos Lake Water Quality Society – which focuses on the impact and relationship of the South Okanagan shrub-steppe ecosystem with Osoyoos Lake – is a community public relations organization.

=== Proposed national park ===
This region is the site of the proposed South Okanagan—Similkameen National Park Reserve.

== Media ==
The region was the subject of a 1999 National Film Board of Canada documentary Pocket Desert – Confessions of a Snake Killer.

== See also ==
- Skaha Bluffs
