= Tumbleweed Film Festival (Washington) =

The Tumbleweed Film festival (TwFF) is an independent film festival that is held in August in Oroville, WA, which is located in Okanogan County. Tumbleweed highlights short films and documentaries from independent filmmakers throughout the world. The festival's venues include local wineries and breweries.

== Festival history ==
- The first annual Tumbleweed Film Festival was held August 6 and 7 2010. The short film "Dishonesty" by Seattle film makers Timothy Watkins and Charles Forsgren won "Best of Fest".
- The 2nd Tumbleweed Film Festival took place August 4–6, 2011. The event kicked off with an outdoor screening of family films at the Veranda Beach Resort. "North Atlantic" by Portuguese filmmaker Bernardo Nascimento won the audience "Best of Fest" award.

Tumbleweed also included "Best of Fest" film events at the Tagaris winery in Richland, Washington, a two-night event at the RockWall Cellars in Omak, Washington and a three-day festival in Osoyoos, British Columbia at the Nk'mip Desert Cultural Centre, which was sponsored by the Nk'Mip Resort and the Osoyoos Indian Band. The top audience film at the Osoyoos event was the short film "Time Freak" by filmmaker Andrew Bowler.

- The third TwFF took place August 2–4, 2012 and the fourth is scheduled to take place August 1–3, 2013.
- The 10th TwFF took place in Oroville, WA Aug 2-3, 2019.
