= Clarence Louie =

Canadian First Nations leader and businessman

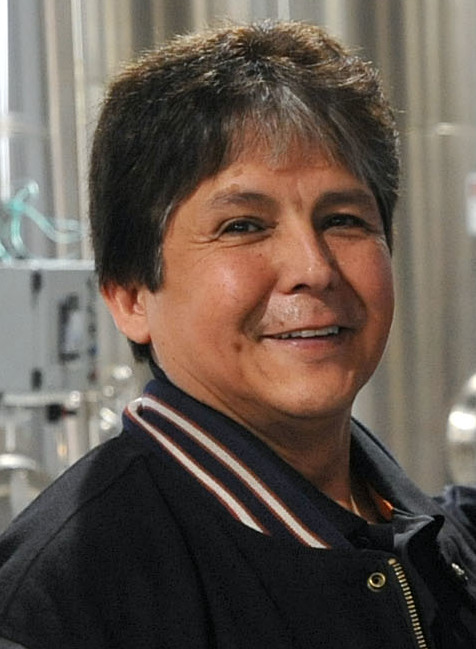
- Born: 1959 or 1960 (age 65–66); Oliver, British Columbia, Canada
- Education: First Nations University; University of Lethbridge
- Occupations: First Nations leader and businessman

Clarence Louie CM OBC (born 1960) is a Canadian First Nations leader and businessman. Louie has been the chief of the Osoyoos Indian Band in British Columbia's Okanagan for ten terms, the first beginning in 1985. He has been credited with contributing to the economic success of the small community, and has received regional, national, and international recognition, including the Order of British Columbia in 2004 and the Order of Canada in 2016.

== Early life ==
Louie was born near Oliver and raised on the Osoyoos reserve by a single mother. Due to high unemployment, many adults in the community had to work as transient labourers on fruit orchards in nearby Washington state. Louie was forced to be self-sufficient during his childhood years. At age 19, he left British Columbia and enrolled in First Nations University in Regina, Saskatchewan. He then studied native studies at the University of Lethbridge in Alberta. After receiving his degree, he returned to the Okanagan.

== Tenure as chief ==
At 24 years of age, Louie was elected as chief of the Osoyoos Indian Band. The band has 460 members, and controls 32,000 acres (13,000 ha) of land. He started the Osoyoos Indian Band Development Corporation (OIBDC) in 1988. Through the corporation's efforts, the previously impoverished band started or acquired nine businesses, including tourism, construction, and recreation companies. The band now employs 700 people including non-First Nations. A high-profile business started by the OIBDC during Louie's tenure is Nk'Mip Cellars, the first aboriginal-owned winery in North America.

Louie has served 10 terms as of 2012, winning every election but one since 1985. He consulted with federal finance minister Jim Flaherty in 2008 on matters of economic development. He is a two-term chair of the National Aboriginal Economic Development Board. In 2003, Louie was chosen by the U.S. Department of State as one of six Canadian First Nations leaders to review economic development in American Indian communities. In 2004, he received the Order of British Columbia. Louie has also been involved in land claim settlements with the provincial government. He was given the Freedom of the Town of Oliver British Columbia on 21 July 2017.
