= Jen Senko =

American documentary filmmaker and author

Jennifer Senko
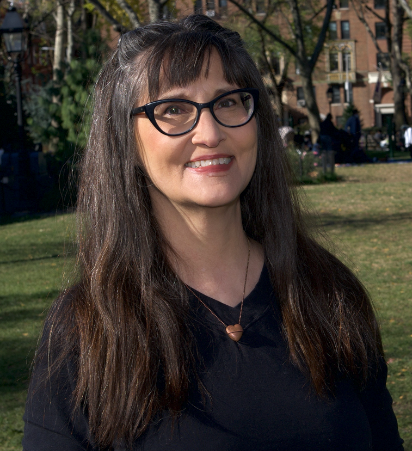
- Born: June 23, 1954 (age 72); Douglas, Arizona, U.S.
- Occupations: Filmmaker; author
- Years active: 1992 – present

Jennifer A. Senko (born June 23, 1954), is an American documentary filmmaker, author and truth-in-media activist. She is best known for her work on the documentary films The Vanishing City, and The Brainwashing of My Dad. Senko is a regular contributor on podcasts and panel discussions.

== Life and career ==
Senko graduated on the Dean's List from Pratt Institute, where she studied communications design and painting. She directed the 2000 short, Road Map Warrior Women; a road trip documentary about extraordinarily independent women in the West. She co-directed the 2010 feature documentary, The Vanishing City, along with Fiore DeRosa, about gentrification's dire consequences in New York City and in other major cities around the world.

Senko directed the 2016 film, The Brainwashing of My Dad about her father's cult-like transformation from a non-political, easy-going Democrat to an always-angry, extreme Republican after he discovered talk radio on a lengthened commute to work.

== Filmography ==
Year	Title	Contribution	Note
1992	The Tune	Actor (voices)	Animation
1997	I Married a Strange Person!	Actor (voices)	Animation
2000	Road Map Warrior Women	Director, writer, and producer	Documentary
2003	The Downsizing of The Gods	Producer	Short film
2006	La Chiva	Casting director	Short film
2009	Ipso facto	Producer	Short film
2010	The Vanishing City	Director, writer, and producer	Documentary
2016	The Brainwashing of My Dad	Director, writer, and producer	Documentary

== Publications ==
- 2021 – The Brainwashing of My Dad ISBN 978-1-7282395-9-0

== Awards and nominations ==
Year	Result	Award	Category	Work	Ref.
2010	Won	Harlem International Film Festival	Best Short Documentary	The Vanishing City	
2010	Won	LA Film Festival	Honorable Mention Feature Documentary	The Vanishing City	
2010	Won	WorldFest-Houston International Film Festival	Remi Winner Documentary	The Vanishing City	
2010	Won	Williamsburg Independent Film Festival	Best Feature Documentary	The Vanishing City	
2015	Staff Favorite	Traverse City Film Festival	"Work-In-Progress"	The Brainwashing of My Dad	
2016	Honorable Mention	Accolade Humanitarian Global Film Competition	Documentary Feature	The Brainwashing of My Dad	
2016	Award of Excellence	Impact Doc Awards	Documentary Film	The Brainwashing of My Dad	
2021	Won	Webby Awards	Video - People’s Voice Award in Public Service & Activism	The Brainwashing of My Dad	
