= Osoyoos Desert Society =

Non-profit organization in British Columbia

Coordinates: 49.0538°N 119.5200°W

The Osoyoos Desert Society is a non-profit organization that was founded in 1991 to conserve and restore the biologically diverse area of the British Columbian Southern interior. This area had not been the focus of previous conservation efforts, even though it contains a large concentration of at-risk species.

One of the area's main features is Okanagan Desert, a semi-arid region in the southern part of the Okanagon region of British Columbia, notable for having some plant species not found anywhere else in Canada. Another feature is the Osoyoos Lake, which extends into Washington state in the United States.

The group has received funding from Environment Canada, the Habitat Conservations Trust Fund, and Human Resources Development Canada.

== Osoyoos Desert Centre ==
The society, as part of its conservation efforts, created the Osoyoos Desert Centre in 1998, a "nature interpretive facility where visitors can learn about desert ecology, habitat restoration and conservation of endangered ecosystems in the South Okanagan." It is located 3 kilometers north of the town of Osoyoos off of Highway 97, and is 67 acres in size. Along with the main building, the facilities include a 1.5-kilometer long boardwalk and a "plant demonstration garden". It is open annually for self-guided tours from late April to early October, although group tours of 10 or more people are available year-round.

== See also ==
- Okanagan Desert
