= The Brainwashing of My Dad =

2015 documentary film

- Promotional release poster
- Directed by: Jen Senko
- Written by: Jen Senko; Melodie Bryant; Fiore DeRosa; Kala Mandrake
- Produced by: Matthew Modine; Adam Rackoff
- Starring: Noam Chomsky; Jeff Cohen; Frank Luntz; Thom Hartmann; David Brock; Eric Boehlert; Kathleen Taylor (Dr.)
- Narrated by: Matthew Modine
- Edited by: Kala Mandrake
- Production company: Cinco Dedos Películas
- Release dates: July 29, 2015 (Traverse City Film Festival); March 18, 2016 (Theatrical and streaming)
- Running time: 89 minutes
- Country: United States
- Language: English

The Brainwashing of My Dad is a 2015 American documentary film directed by Jen Senko. Inspired by what she viewed as her father’s radicalization by right-wing media, Senko explores forces she argues are behind a rise in such media, the deliberate strategies that fueled its influence, its impact on families including her own, and its perceived role in deepening political divisions across the nation.

== Synopsis ==
As Senko tries to understand the transformation of her father from a nonpolitical Democrat to an angry Republican fanatic, she examines the forces behind the media that changed him completely: a plan by Roger Ailes, under President Richard Nixon, to create a Republican propaganda machine. The film explores the 1971 Powell Memo urging business leaders to influence institutions of public opinion, the 1987 repeal of the Fairness Doctrine under President Ronald Reagan, and the 1996 Telecommunications Act under President Bill Clinton, which enabled media consolidation.

What starts as a daughter's personal journey becomes an examination of a far-reaching phenomenon: a right-wing media ecosystem—backed by libertarian billionaires, conservative think tanks, and political operatives—designed to manipulate public opinion, deepen polarization, and shift the political landscape to the far right. Through historical analysis and intimate storytelling, the documentary looks at the hidden mechanisms behind this radicalization.

The film raises what Senko views as urgent questions: Who controls the media? What rights do audiences have? And what responsibility does the government bear in ensuring a fair and truthful media landscape?

== Content ==
Senko's father, Frank, was originally a "nonpolitical Kennedy Democrat" who converted into a far-right Republican in the late 1980s and 1990s., as he began listening to conservative talk radio during a long commute to a new job. In particular, he listened to Rush Limbaugh and watched Fox News. In his final years, Frank's views largely changed back to middle of the road due to his wife, Eileen, exposing him to less-biased media.

== Production ==
The film gained 947 backers on Kickstarter. People who noticed the campaign and had similar stories wrote to Senko. She followed up by Skype to interview them about their stories, which were included in the film. One Kickstarter backer, Ryan Smith, became an executive producer and provided the remaining funding needed. Other executive producers were: Danny Goldberg and Jennifer Schultz. Matthew Modine and Adam Rackoff of Cinco Dedos Peliculas production company came on as producers. Mr. Modine also co-narrated the film along with Jen. Archivist Richard Kroll was hired to search for photographs and video material. A work in progress version of the film showed at the Traverse City Film Festival in August of 2015. The theatrical and streaming version was released in March 2016.

== Reception ==
=== Critical response ===
On review aggregator Rotten Tomatoes, the film holds an approval rating of 58% based on 12 reviews, with an average rating of 7.20/10. Christine N. Ziemba of Paste wrote "Through anecdotal and social science research, Senko's film also provides much-needed insight as to why Donald Trump's caustic discourse and demagoguery is catnip for so many people." Carole Di Tosti of Blogcritics wrote a positive review, saying that "The documentary is well edited and tells a fascinating story of propagandists, stealth and wealth. Senko exposes how the conservative media network seeded anti-democratic values by changing the issues to 'morality and family values' [...] diverting the focus from economic equality."

== See also ==
- Brainwashing
