= Blue-listed =

Blue-listed species are species that belong to the Blue List and includes any indigenous species or subspecies (taxa) considered to be vulnerable in their locale in order to provide early warning to federal and regional governments. Vulnerable taxa are of special concern because of characteristics that make them particularly sensitive to human activities or natural events. Blue-listed taxa are at risk, but are not extirpated, endangered or threatened.

== History ==
The concept of a Blue List was derived in 1971 by Robert Arbib from the National Audubon Society in his article, "Announcing-- The Blue List: an 'early warning' system for birds". The article stated that the list was made up for species that appear to be locally common in North America, but is undergoing non-cyclic declines. Starting from 1971, it was utilized to list vulnerable bird species throughout North America. Unlike the US Fish and Wildlife Endangered Species List, the Blue List was made to identify patterns of population losses for regional bird populations before they could be listed as endangered. Every decade after its release, the list is revisited and revised based on regional editors and species get "nominated" to be added to the list. From then on, species that are part of the Blue List were referred to as Blue-listed species.

== Status Ranks ==
Initially, in order to identify the types of risks that each Blue-Listed species have, the Blue List has identified various categories for Blue-Listed species based on the following alphabets:

"A": the species population is "greatly down in numbers"

"B": the species population is "down in numbers"

"C": the species population is experiencing no change

"D": the species population is "up in numbers"

"E": the species population is "greatly up in numbers"

Using this metric reginal editors were able to report on the species along with their status ranks in order to identify the patterns of population growth that each species is facing. Later on, the Government of British Columbia has revised the status ranks such that Blue-Listed species are listed based on the following modifier codes:

Modifier Codes	Meaning
1	The population is greatly at risk of being put at harm
2	The population is at risk of being put at harm
3	The population is of special concern and is vulnerable to extinction
4	The population is apparently safe but some concern is still needed
5	The population is completely safe and abundant

== See also ==
- Biodiversity Action Plan
- Red-listed
