= Osoyoos Indian Band =

First Nation government in British Columbia, Canada

- Band No. 596
- People: Okanagan people
- Headquarters: Oliver
- Province: British Columbia

Land
- Main reserve: Osoyoos 1
- Reserve: Osoyoos 3
- Land area: 130.738 km^{2} (50.478 sq mi)

Population (2025)
- On reserve: 365
- On other land: 61
- Off reserve: 176
- Total population: 602

Government
- Chief: Clarence Louie

Tribal Council
- Okanagan Nation Alliance

Website
- oib.ca

The Osoyoos Indian Band (Okanagan: Swiw̓s) is a First Nations government in the Canadian province of British Columbia, located in the adjacent towns of Oliver and Osoyoos in the Okanagan valley, approximately 4 km (2.5 mi) north of the Canada–United States border. They are a member of the Okanagan Nation Alliance. The band controls about 32,000 acres of land in the Oliver-Osoyoos area.

The band's Nk'Mip Desert Cultural Centre (pronounced "in-ka-meep") is located on the east side of Osoyoos. The centre gives tours in the arid region (similar to desert, but actually shrub-steppe) and explains the uniqueness of the plant and animal species found there.

As of 2025, the chief of the band is Clarence Louie. Louie has pushed for economic self-reliance by expanding investments, including a vineyard and winery, a four-star resort, numerous consumer services, and an 18-hole golf course.

There are about 540 band members who live and work on the reserve.

== Gallery ==
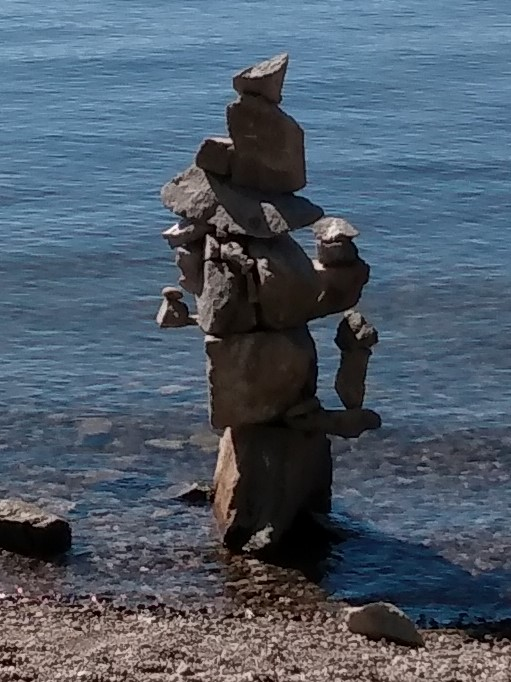
Inuksuk on shore of sw̓iw̓s Provincial Park operated by Osoyoos Indian Band, Osoyoos Lake, Osoyoos, British Columbia

== See also ==
- Okanagan people
