= Nk'Mip Desert Cultural Centre =

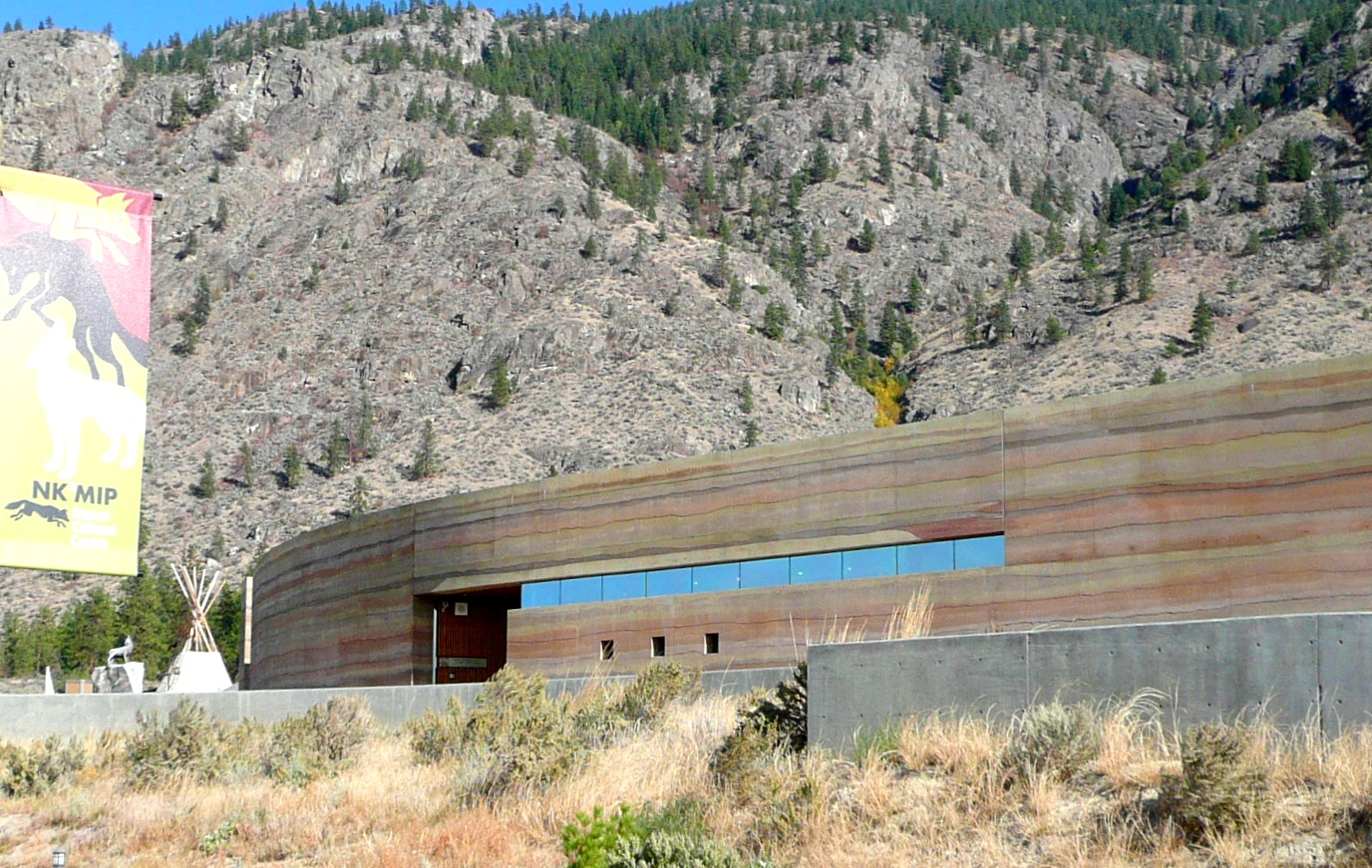
- Nk'Mip Desert Cultural Centre main entry with rammed earth wall
- Interactive map of the Nk'Mip Desert Cultural Centre area

General information
- Location: 1000 Rancher Creek Road; Osoyoos, British Columbia
- Coordinates: 49.0412°N 119.4342°W
- Completed: 2006

Technical details
- Floor area: 39,000 m^{2} (420,000 sq ft) (interior and exterior spaces)

Design and construction
- Architect: Hotson Bakker Boniface Haden

Website
- nkmipdesert.com

The Nk'Mip Desert Culture Centre (Okanagan: [n̩kʼəˈmip]; conventional English pronunciation respelling "in-ka-meep") is an interpretive centre in Osoyoos, British Columbia, Canada, It is owned and operated by the Osoyoos Indian Band and is approximately 3 km (2 mi) north of the Canada–United States border. It is situated within a semi-arid shrub-steppe desert environment, which is one of the most endangered ecosystems in Canada.

The mission of the Centre is to exhibit the Okanagan Desert and the culture of the Okanagan people, and to promote conservation efforts for desert wildlife. The Centre has helped to create several spin-off businesses, including a landscaping business, a greenhouse for indigenous plants, a website development business, and a community arts and crafts market.

== Exhibits ==
The Centre includes both indoor and outdoor exhibits and trails. It is designed as an interactive learning environment with hands-on displays and two multi-media theatres. Exhibits include recreated examples of Aboriginal architecture structures: a Tipi, Pit-house, and Sweat lodge. The building is adjacent to a remnant of the desert, approximately 1,600 acres of which are being preserved as a conservation area. Trailheads lead to 1.5 km of desert paths leading to reconstructed examples of First Nations buildings and interpretive sculptures.

The Centre's Rattlesnake Research Program receives support from Environment Canada to study Western Rattlesnakes and Great Basin Gopher snakes. The snakes are tracked and studied by biologists using radio telemetry.

== Facilities ==
The Centre was designed by Hotson Bakker Boniface Haden architects + urbanists (now DIALOG), and completed in 2006. The construction cost was $6.6 million for the 39,000 m^{2} (420,000 sq ft) (interior and exterior spaces) facility. The design is both an homage to the traditional winter dwellings of the Okanagan peoples and a literal integration into the natural landscape with a contemporary architectural design. The building is constructed partially underground with the desert landscape extending over the building's planted (green) roof and the front of the building is constructed of a rammed earth facade. This rammed earth wall is constructed of local soils, concrete, and colour additives. At 80 m (260 ft) long, 5.5 m (18 ft) high, and 0.6 m (2 ft) thick, it is (as of 2014) the largest in North America. Its thickness and mass provide an insulating value of R-33 that help to provide a more stable indoor temperature than the large temperature swings of the surrounding desert climate. One architectural jurist described it: "the chameleon-like wall defines an ambiguous threshold between landscape and building."

Blue stain pine boards are used throughout the interior of the project. This wood, Lodgepole pine damaged by the Mountain pine beetle and blue stain fungus was harvested from local forests devastated by these species. The use of this material serves as a demonstration project of how this product, which is typically considered unsuitable for a finish material, can be utilized.

== Awards ==
The Centre and its facility have been recognized with architectural, aboriginal, and regional awards:

- Governor General's Medal in Architecture (2008)
- SAB Award, Sustainable Architecture & Building Magazine (2008)
- Royal Architectural Institute of Canada - Award of Excellence, Innovation in Architecture (2007)
- World Architecture Festival Award (2008)
- Lieutenant-Governor's of BC Medal of Excellence in Architecture (2007)
- Wood Design Green Award, Canadian Wood Council (2007)
- Awards for Excellence in Concrete Construction, Decorative Concrete Award, BC Ready–Mix Concrete Association (2007)
- Aboriginal Tourism BC "Power of Education Award" for the Rattlesnake Research Program
- Aboriginal Tourism BC "Inspirational Leadership Award"
- Okanagan Life Best of the Okanagan 2010 – Editors Choice Awards
