= Steamboats of the upper Columbia and Kootenay Rivers =

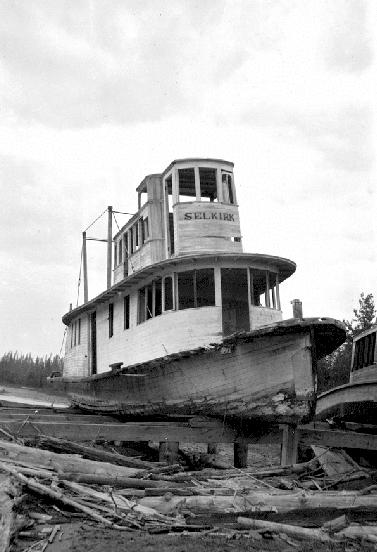
Abandoned steamboats at Golden, BC c. 1926. Selkirk is clearly shown, a portion of a smaller unidentified vessel is visible on right.

From 1886 to 1920, steamboats ran on the upper reaches of the Columbia and Kootenay in the Rocky Mountain Trench, in western North America. The circumstances of the rivers in the area, and the construction of transcontinental railways across the trench from east to west made steamboat navigation possible.

== Geographic factors ==
The Columbia River begins at Columbia Lake, flows north in the trench through the Columbia Valley to Windermere Lake to Golden, British Columbia. The Kootenay River flows south from the Rocky Mountains, then west into the Rocky Mountain Trench, coming within just over a mile (1.6 km) from Columbia Lake, at a point called Canal Flats, where a shipping canal was built in 1889. The Kootenay then flows south down the Rocky Mountain Trench, crosses the international border and then turns north back into Canada and into Kootenay Lake near the town of Creston. (Note: The same river is spelled "Kootenay" in Canada and "Kootenai" in the United States.)

The upper Columbia and the upper Kootenay rivers were different in character. From Columbia Lake to Golden, the Columbia river is shallow and slow, running through twisting channels and falling only 50 feet (15 m) in elevation from its headwaters to Golden. From Golden the river flows north to Donald, then turns sharply south at the Big Bend, where it continues south past Revelstoke then south to Arrowhead, where it widens into the Arrow Lakes. The Big Bend, in its natural state before the construction of the Revelstoke and Mica dams, included a series of rapids which made it impassable to steam navigation proceeding upriver from the Arrow Lakes.

The Kootenay River (before the construction of the Libby Dam) flowed faster than the Columbia south down through Jennings Canyon, an extremely hazardous stretch of whitewater, on the way to Jennings and Libby, Montana. Larger steamboats could operate on the upper Kootenay than on the upper Columbia. The Kootenay river flows on into Idaho, where it turns north and flows back into Canada. Near Creston the Kootenay River enters Kootenay Lake. With some difficulty, steamboats could progress up the lower Kootenay to railhead at Bonners Ferry, Idaho. Rapids and falls on the Kootenay blocked steam navigation between Bonner's Ferry and Libby.

== Rail construction ==
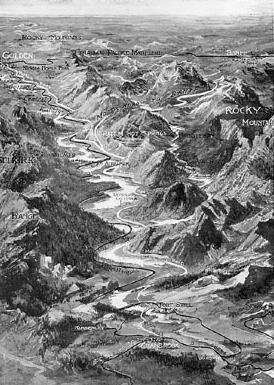
This birds-eye view map from 1913 gives an artistic impression of the Columbia Valley-upper Kootenay Valley region of the Rocky Mountain Trench.

Rail construction in Canada and the United States made steam navigation possible in the Rocky Mountain Trench. There were two important railheads, Golden, BC and Jennings, Montana, near Libby. At Golden, the transcontinental line of the Canadian Pacific Railway ("CPR"), which parallels the Columbia south from the bridge at Donald, turns east to follow the Kicking Horse River, surmounting the Continental Divide at Kicking Horse Pass, then running past the resort at Banff then east to Calgary. Jennings was reached by the Great Northern Railway, built across the Northern United States from Minnesota to Washington by James J. Hill. Between these railheads the Rocky Mountain Trench ran for 300 miles (500 km), almost all of which was potentially accessible to steam navigation. Canal Flats was close to the midpoint, being just south of Columbia Lake, 124 miles (200 km) upstream from Golden.

== Beginning of steam navigation ==
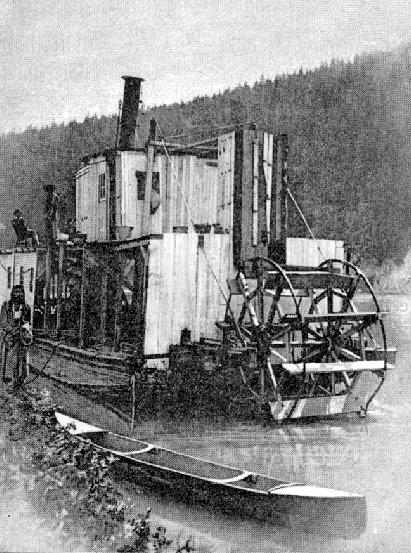
Duchess, steamboat, near Golden, BC ca. 1886. This is the best-known photograph of this unique vessel. A member of the First Nations is also shown near the steamer.

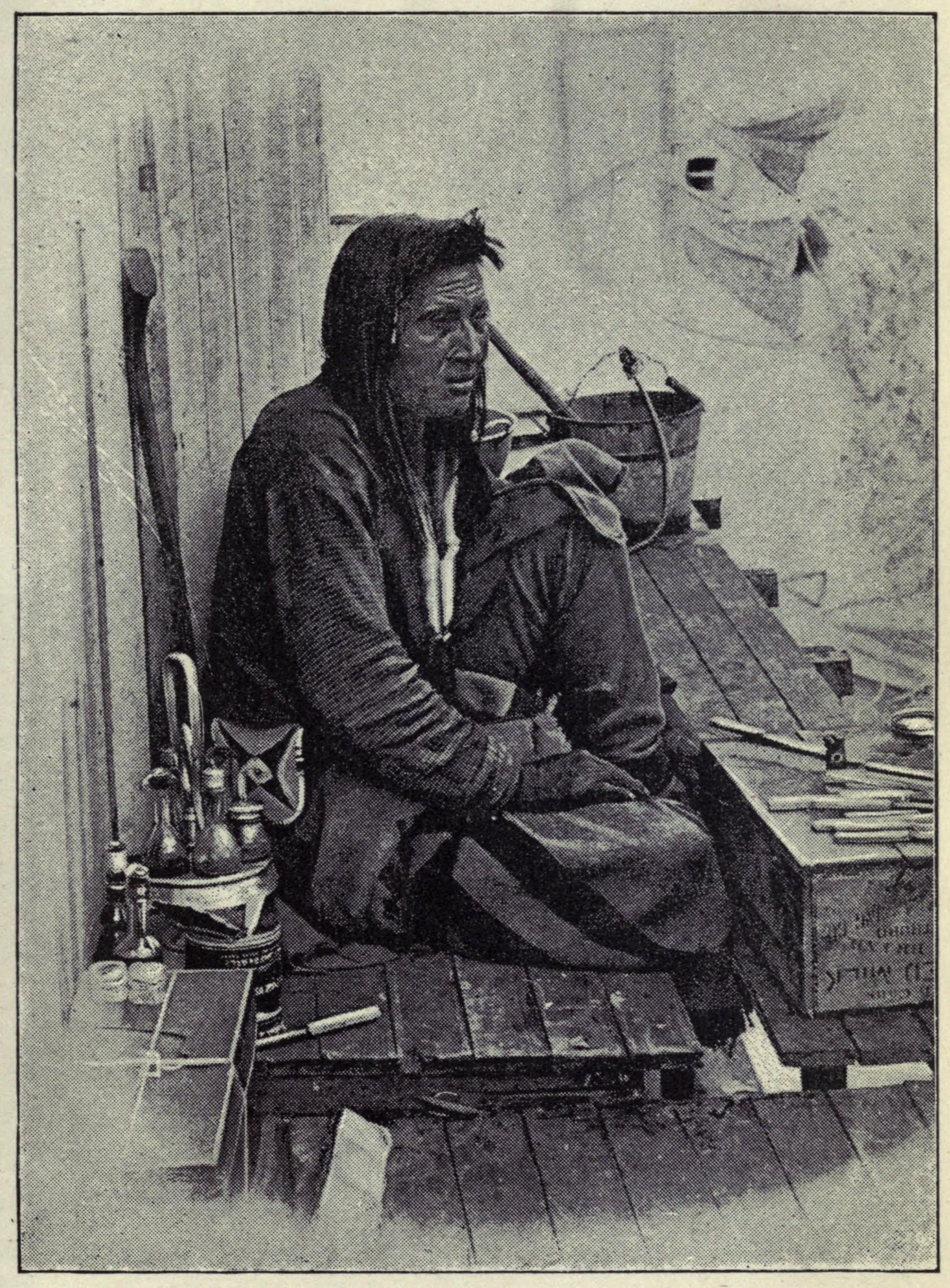
In the East Kootenay region, members of the Ktunaxa First Nation often served as crewmen aboard steamboats. This man was one of the crew of the first Duchess in 1887

In 1886, Frank P. Armstrong assembled a steamboat from miscellaneous planks and timbers that were lying around at an old sawmill. The result was the Duchess, launched in 1886 at Golden. Two early passengers wrote that her appearance was "somewhat decrepit" and Armstrong himself later agreed that she was "a pretty crude steamboat."

In 1886 an "uprising" among the First Nations was occurring far down the Rocky Mountain Trench along the Kootenay River. A detachment of the North-West Mounted Police, under Major (later General) Samuel Benfield Steele (1848–1919), was sent to Golden with orders to proceed to the Kootenay to quell the so-called uprising. Steele decided to hire Armstrong and the Duchess to transport his troopers. This proved to be a mistake, as once the expedition's horse fodder, ammunition, officers' uniforms, and other supplies were loaded on board, Duchess capsized and sank. After this setback, Steele decided to hire the only other steam vessel on the upper Columbia, the Clive.

Clive which like Duchess was assembled from various cast-off and second-hand components, was an even worse vessel. Once Steele had loaded his trooper's equipment on Clive, that vessel sank as well. Steele and his troop ended up riding the 150 miles (240 km) south to Galbraith's Landing. This took about a month. When they arrived, the troopers set up a standard military encampment which later became the town of Fort Steele. By this time, the "uprising" was over.

== Professionally constructed steamboats appear ==
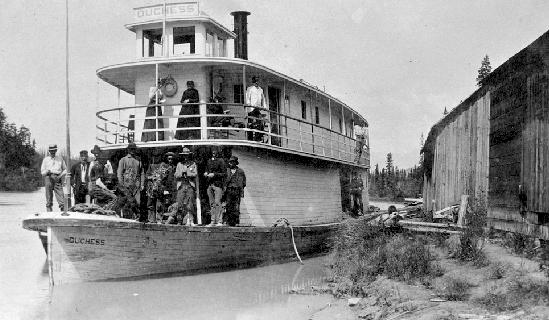
Duchess at Golden, BC, ca 1888

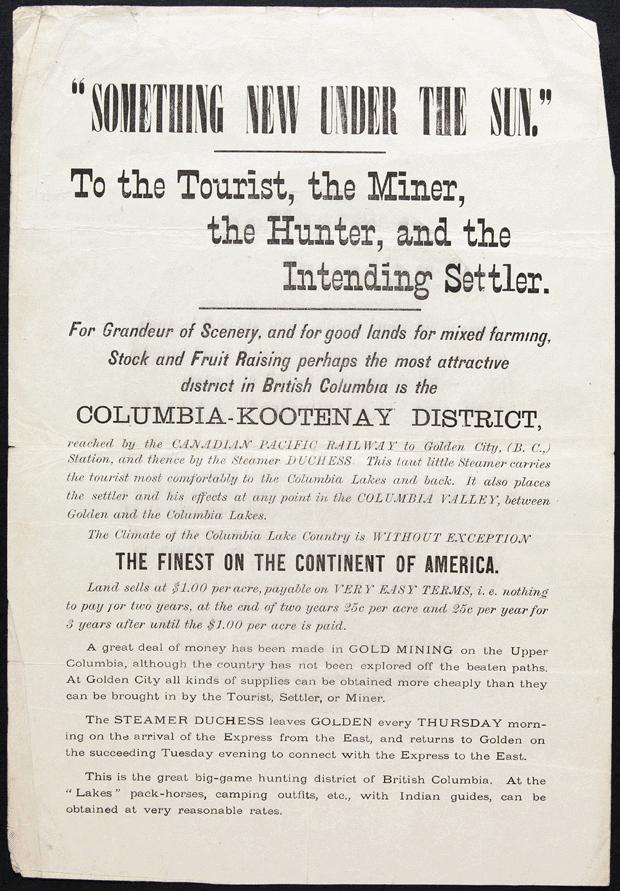
Handbill promoting Duchess and the Columbia Valley ca 1888

Armstrong was eventually able to raise Duchess from the river bottom. He then applied the odd-shaped steamer to make enough money in 1887 to have a new sternwheeler built, also called Duchess. Armstrong hired the veteran shipbuilder Alexander Watson, of Victoria, British Columbia, to build the new steamer, which although small, was well-designed and looked like a steamboat instead of a floating old barn. Someone arranged to have handbills printed up, which on one side bore a woodcut print showing an idealized version of the new Duchess, and on the other side bore a statement showing the company's marketing strategy, which was to appeal to tourists, miners, hunters, and intending settlers, holding out the Duchess as the best means of accessing the Columbia Valley.

The handbill then praised the climate of the Columbia Valley as "WITHOUT EXCEPTION THE FINEST ON THE CONTINENT OF AMERICA" which even so was available at $1.00 per acre, payable five years. Gold mining was said to be prosperous, with the hint of more yet to be discovered, as "the country has not been explored off the beaten paths". All kinds of supplies were to be had cheaper than they could be shipped at Golden City all kinds of supplies can be obtained more cheaply than they can be brought in "by the Tourist, Settler, or Miner". Finally, the handbill advertised the important role and schedule that the new steamer Duchess would play in the development of the Columbia Valley:

The STEAMER DUCHESS leaves GOLDEN every THURSDAY morning on the arrival of the Express from the East, and returns to Golden on the succeeding Tuesday evening to connect with the express to the East. This is the great big-game hunting district of British Columbia. At the "Lakes" pack-horses, camping outfits, etc., with Indian guides, can be arranged at very reasonable rates.

Armstrong also had built a second steamer, Marion, which although smaller than the second Duchess, needed only six inches of water to run in. This was an advantage in the often shallow waters of the Columbia above Golden, where as Armstrong put it, "the river's bottom was often very close to the river's top".

== Navigation improvements ==
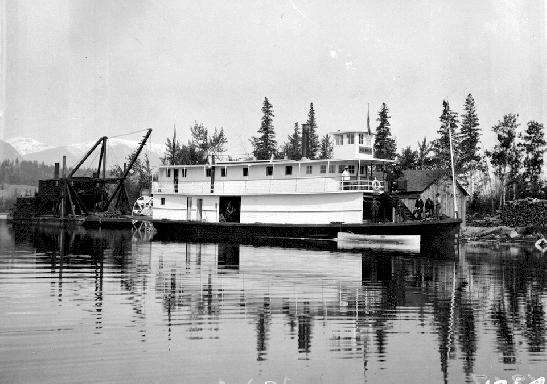
Duchess on right, Mud Lark (clam-shell dredge), on left, upper Columbia River, ca 1895

The upper Columbia was choked with snags, which were sunken logs jammed in the river bottom and sticking into the river. These could be significant barriers to navigation, as shown by the 23 days it took Clive to travel the 100 miles (160 km) up to Windermere Lake. A significant reason for this delay were the numerous snags in the river. Snag removal was done by a specialized vessel called a "snag boat" which was equipped with a large hoist and powerful winches to pull the snags out of the river. ( Samson V at New Westminster, BC and W.T. Preston, at Anacortes, Washington, are two excellent existing examples of Pacific Northwest sternwheel snagboats.) In 1892, the Dominion government put a snag boat, the Muskrat o the upper river, which must have significantly improved river transportation.

Another barrier to navigation on the upper Columbia was the numerous sandbars that were used by spawning salmon. A clam shell dredge was employed to deepen the sandbars by digging out the river bottom. This would have had the adverse side effect of damaging the salmon spawning grounds.

== Carrying the mail ==
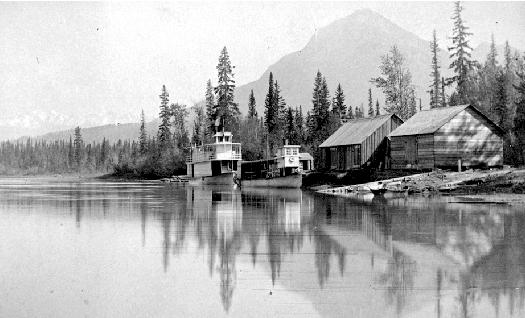
Duchess and Marion at north end of Columbia Lake

Armstrong obtained a contract from the Canadian Post Office Department on May 1, 1888, to carry mail on the 200-mile (320 km) route from Golden to Cranbrook. Armstrong carried the mail twice a week on Duchess, or when the water was low, on Marion, up to Columbia Lake. Once at the lake, the steamer connected with a stage line, which ran the mail across Canal Flats and down the valley of the Kootenay River to Grohman, Fort Steele, and Cranbrook. The contract was renewed in the years from 1889 to 1892. When the mail could not be carried on the river, due to low or frozen water, Armstrong had mail carried overland on the Columbia Valley wagon road. The mail contracts were renewed from 1893 to 1897, with the mail running from Golden to the St. Eugene Mission in the Kootenay Valley. The mail contract provided an important subsidy for Captain Armstrong and the Upper Columbia Company.

Persons living along the upper Columbia who wished to mail lighters or have freight shipped would hail or flag down the mail steamer. The boat's captain would then nose the bow of the boat into the bank using the boat's sternwheel to keep the vessel in place. The mail would be picked up or the freight loaded, the fees collected, and the vessel would proceed. In April 1897 the Upper Columbia Company lost the mail contact, which created a situation where customers would flag down the steamer for a letter which the steamer was getting paid no money to carry.

== Upper Columbia Company "postage stamps" ==
Reluctant to antagonize potential freight customers by refusing letters, but not wishing to interrupt company operations for free mail carriage, the company's purser, C.H. Parson, had the company print up its own postage stamps. One thousand "stamps" with the initials "U.C." (for Upper Columbia Company) and the denomination of 5 cents were printed. One thousand more "labels" with just the initials "U.C" were also printed. An ordinary letter in those days cost 3 cents to send, so the Upper Columbia Company's "stamps" were considerably more than regular postage. The idea seems to have been to discourage the use of the steamer for mail, and perhaps to make a little money on the side. The details of how stamps and labels were used are not clear, but clearly some did pass through the Canadian mails with additional official postage stamps also affixed. Genuine envelopes (called "covers") bearing the stamps or labels of the Upper Columbia Company are rare philatelic items and are sought after by stamp collectors.

Covers bearing the labels or stamps of the Upper Columbia Company attracted the attention of stamp collectors and became sought-after rarities. Faked covers have appeared, made with the objective of deceiving collectors. Knowledge of the history of the Upper Columbia Company is important to make judgment as to whether a particular cover is genuine or a fake.

== The Baillie-Grohman Canal ==
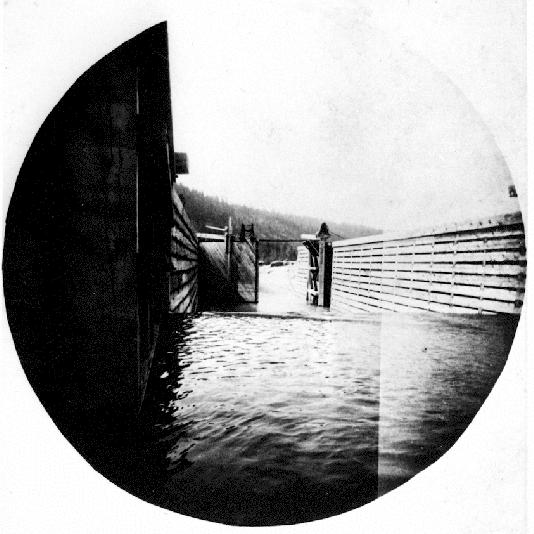
Completed lock at Canal Flats, ca 1889. The timber for these locks was cut from local ponderosa pine by the sawmill brought to Canal Flats by Wm. A. Baillie-Grohman on the pioneer steamer Clive.

In the early 1880s a wealthy European adventurer, William Adolf Baillie-Grohman (1851–1921), travelled to the Kootenay Region and became obsessed with developing an area far down the Kootenay River near the southern end of Kootenay Lake called Kootenay Flats, near the modern town of Creston, BC. The problem for Baillie-Grohman was that the Kootenay River kept flooding Kootenay Flats. Baillie-Grohman thought the downstream flooding could be lessened by diverting the upstream portion of the Kootenay River into the Columbia River through the Canal Flats. This would have increased the water flow through the Columbia River, particularly near Golden and Donald, where Baillie-Grohman's proposal, if it had been implemented, would have threatened to flood the newly built transcontinental railroad and other areas of the Columbia Valley.

The provincial government refused to allow the diversion. However, Baillie-Grohman was able to obtain ownership of large areas of land in the Kootenay region, provided he engaged in certain forms of economic development, including construction of a shipping canal and a lock. The lock was necessary because the Kootenay River was 11 ft higher (3.4 m) than the level of Columbia Lake.

The Baillie-Grohman canal was used only three times by steam-powered vessels. In 1893, Armstrong built Gwendoline at Hansen's Landing on the Kootenay River, and took the vessel through the canal north to the shipyard at Golden to complete her fitting out. In late May 1894 Armstrong returned the completed Gwendoline back to the Kootenay River, transiting the canal.

The canal remained unused until 1902, Armstrong brought North Star north from the Kootenay to the Columbia. The transit of North Star was only made possible by the destruction of the lock at the canal, thus making it unusable.

== The Upper Columbia Navigation and Tramway Company ==
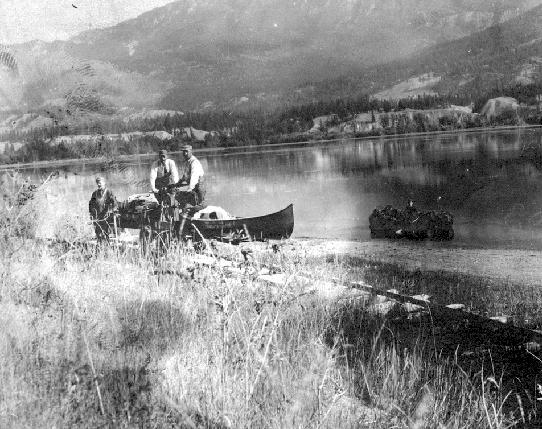
Portage tramway at Canal Flats

About 5 miles (8 km) north of Columbia Lake, the river widened again into another lake. Originally this was called Mud Lake, which may have been an indication of its depth and general condition, but later this was changed to Adela Lake. The 5-mile (8 km) stretch between Adela Lake and Columbia Lake was shallow and difficult to navigate even for the very shallow draft steamers that Armstrong was running on the river. Armstrong's solution to the problem was to incorporate the Upper Columbia Navigation and Tramway Company ("UCN&TC"). The company's charter required it to construct two tramways to improve transport. Armstrong served as manager and T.B.H. Cochrane as president.

The Upper Columbia Company built two horse or mule-drawn tramways, one at the start of the route running from the CPR depot at Golden Station to the point 2 miles (3 km) south where the Kicking Horse River ran into the Columbia. It was here that the company had located its steamboat dock.

The second tramway was located further upriver. It ran 5 miles (8 km) in length, from Adela Lake, BC. south to Columbia Lake. The tramways were like railways except that the cars were horsedrawn, and the carts were much smaller than rail cars. The company had steamers on Columbia Lake and the Kootenay River, but did not use the Grohman Canal, portaging traffic over Canal Flats rather than using the canal, which in fact was only used twice by steamboats during its existence.

With the tramways in place, the 300-mile (500 km) transportation chain from the rail depot at Golden to Jennings Montana ran as follows. Freight would be taken on the tramway to the steamboat dock at Golden, and loaded on a steamer. The steamer ran upriver to the south end of Windermere Lake. The freight would then be portaged around Mud (or Adlin) Lake, to Columbia Lake. Once at Columbia Lake, the cargo would be loaded again on a steamboat, this time the Pert and run to the south end of Columbia Lake, where it was unloaded again, portaged across Canal Flats and loaded again on another steamer on the Kootenay river, and run down to Jennings, passing through Jennings Canyon.

== Steam navigation begins on the upper Kootenay River ==
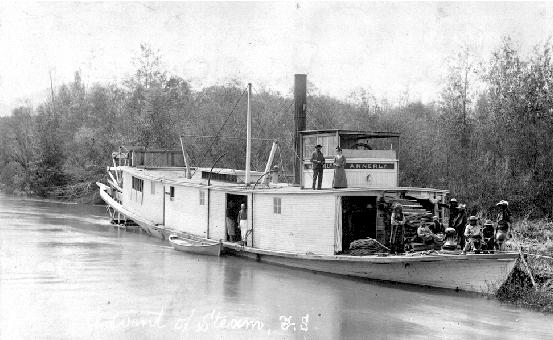
The "nasty little Annerly", ca 1893, first steamboat on upper Kootenay River

Mining activity was increasing in the upper Kootenay valley in the early 1890s. Miners wanted access to the area and needed transport for their supplies. The ore taken out of the mountains had to be hauled out of the area. In the early 1890s there were no railroads near the area, and without transport to a smelter, the mined ore was valueless. The nearest railhead was that of the Great Northern Railway at Jennings, Montana, well over 100 miles (160 km) away from the major mining strikes at Kimberley and Moyie Lake. Overland transport out of the question. The ore could only be moved by marine transport on the Kootenay River. With this in mind, Walter Jones and Captain Harry S. DePuy organized the Upper Kootenay Navigation Company ("UKNC") and in the winter of 1891 to 1892, built at Jennings the small sternwheeler Annerly. With the spring breakup of the ice in 1893, DePuy and Jones were able to get Annerly 130 miles (210 km) upriver to Quick Ranch, about 15 miles (24 km) south of Fort Steele, BC. Once there, Annerly was able to embark passengers and load 50 short tons (45,000 kg) of ore. Returning to Jennings, Jones and DePuy were able to make enough money to hire veteran James D. Miller (1830–1907), one of the most experienced steamboat men in the Pacific Northwest, to hand Annerly for the rest of the 1893 season.

== Rise of competition on the Kootenay River ==
Armstrong also wished to take advantage of the demand for shipping, so moving south from the Columbia to the Kootenay, he built the small sternwheeler Gwendoline at Hansen's Landing, about 12 miles (19 km) north of the present town of Wasa. Instead of taking the ore south to Jennings, Armstrong's plan was to move the ore north across Canal Flats and then down the Columbia to the CPR railhead at Golden. As described, Armstrong took Gwendoline through the Baillie-Grohman canal in the fall of 1893 (or rolled her across Canal Flats), fitted her out at Golden, and returned through the canal in the spring of 1894.

In March 1896, Miller shifted over to run Annerly as an associate of Armstrong's Upper Columbia Navig. & Tramway Co. In 1896, Armstrong and Miller built Ruth at Libby, Montana. Launched April 22, 1896, Ruth at 275 tons was the largest steamer yet to operate on the upper Kootenay River. Ruth, like the second Duchess, was designed and built by a professional shipwright. For Ruth the shipwright Louis Pacquet, of Portland, Oregon. Ruth made the runs downriver to Jennings and the smaller Gwendoline ran upriver with the traffic to Canal Flats and the portage tramway.

The combination of Armstrong, Miller and Wardner, and their construction of Ruth created serious competition for Jones and DePuy of UKNC with their only steamer the barely-adequate Annerly. Large sacks of ore were piling up at Hansen's Landing from the mines, and all needed transport. The competitors reached an agreement to split the traffic on the Kootenay river between them. To earn their share of the revenues from this split, DePuy and Jones built Rustler (125 tons) at Jennings 1896. Rustler reached Hansen's Landing in June 1896 on her run up from Jennings.

Another competitor was Captain Tom Powers, of Tobacco Plain, Montana who traded 15 cayuse horses for the machinery to build a small steamer near Fort Steele, which was called Fool Hen. The machinery was too large for Fool Hen and there was no room for freight. Powers used discarded wooden packing cases from Libby merchants to make his paddlewheel buckets, so that as the steamer churned down the river, the merchants' names rotated again and again as the wheel turned. Shortly after Fool Hen was finished, Powers then removed the engines and placed them in a new steamer, the Libby. This time the engines proved to be too small for the hull, and Libby was used only sporadically in 1894 and 1895.

== Jennings Canyon ==
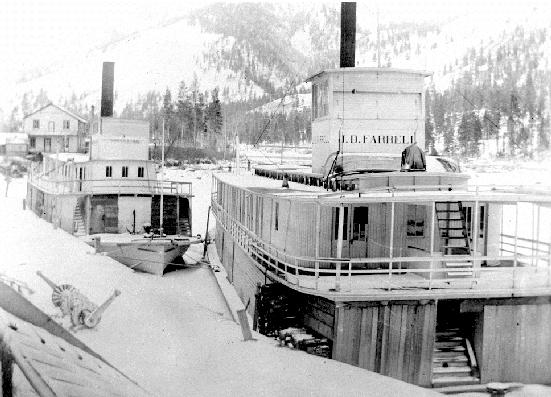
J.D. Farrell (on left) and North Star, in 1901 in Jennings, Montana. In 1897, daily gross earnings from two steamers, Ruth, a similar sized vessel, and Gwendoline, a smaller steamer, were sufficient to pay for a steamboat the size of J.D. Farrell in ten days.

Once in the United States, the Kootenay river, in its natural state before the construction of the Libby Dam, flowed through Jennings Canyon to the settlement of Jennings, Montana. Jennings has almost completely disappeared as a town, but it was near Libby, Montana. Above Jennings, the Kootenay River narrowed as it ran through Jennings Canyon, which was a significant hazard to any river navigation. A particularly dangerous stretch was known as the Elbow. Jennings Canyon was described by Professor Lyman as "a strip of water, foaming-white, downhill almost as on a steep roof, hardly wider than steamboat".

No insurance agent would write a policy for steamboats and cargo transiting the Jennings Canyon. Captain Armstrong once persuaded an agent from San Francisco to consider making a quote on premiums. The agent decided to examine the route for himself, and went on board with Armstrong as the captain's boat shot through the canyon. At the end of the trip, the agent's quote for a policy was one-quarter of the value of the cargo. Faced with this quote, Armstrong decided to forego insurance.

The huge profits to be made seemed to justify the risk. Combined the two steamers could earn $2,000 in gross receipts per day, a lot of money in 1897. By comparison, the sternwheeler J.D. Farrell (1897), cost $20,000 to build in 1897. In ten days of operation then, an entire steamboat could be paid for.

There were no more than seven steamboats that ever passed through Jennings Canyon, Annerly, Gwendoline, Libby, Rustler, Ruth, J.D. Farrell, and North Star (1897). Of these only Annerly and Libby were not wrecked in the canyon. Armstrong and Miller unsuccessfully tried to get the U.S. Government to finance clearing of some of the rocks and obstructions in Jennings Canyon. Without government help, they hired crews themselves to do the work over two winters, but the results were not of much value.

Rustler was the first steamboat casualty of Jennings Canyon. In the summer of 1896, after just six weeks of operation, Rustler was caught in an eddy in the canyon swirled around and smashed into the rocks and damaged beyond repair. This left DePuy and Jones with just one vessel, the "nasty little Annerly", as historian D.M. Wilson described her. DePuy and Jones were unable to stay in business after the loss of Rustler and were forced to sell their facilities at Jennings, as well as Annerly to Armstrong, Miller and Wardner. With their principal competitors gone, Armstrong, Miller and Wardner incorporated their firm on April 5, 1897, in the state of Washington, as the International Transportation Company ("ITC") with nominal headquarters in Spokane. With salvaged machinery from Rustler, they built North Star, launching the new vessel at Jennings on May 28, 1897.

The wreck of Gwendoline and Ruth on May 7, 1897, was perhaps the most spectacular. With no insurance coverage, both Ruth and Gwendoline were running through Jennings Canyon. Ruth under Capt. Sanborn was about an hour ahead of Gwendoline, under Armstrong himself. Both steamers were heavily loaded, and a 26 car train was waiting at Jennings to receive their cargo. Ruth came to the Elbow, lost control, and came to rest blocking the main channel. Gwendoline came through at high speed, and could not avoid smashing into Ruth. No one was killed. However, Ruth was totally destroyed, Gwendoline was seriously damaged, and the cargoes on both steamers were lost. The North Star was near to being complete when the disaster occurred, and once it was launched, Armstrong was able to complete 21 round trips on the Kootenay before low water forced him to tie up on September 3, 1897.

== Steam navigation ends on upper Kootenay river ==
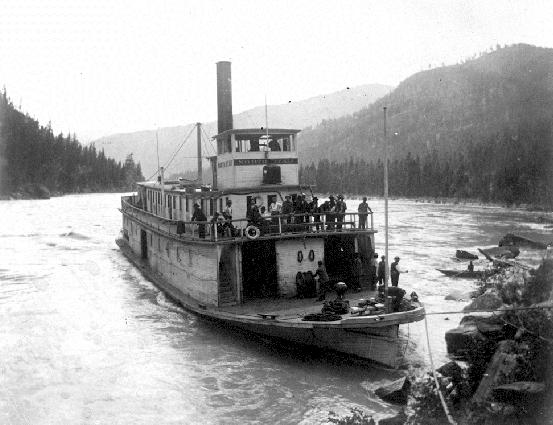
North Star on the upper Columbia River. This vessel was built to counter competition from rival interests which launched J.D. Farrell. When brought through the Baillie-Grohman Canal in 1902 by Captain Armstrong, North Star was by far the largest vessel ever to operate on the upper Columbia.

In the summer of 1897 a new competitor for Armstrong, Miller and Wardell arose. With the backing of John D. Farrell, steamboat captain M.L. McCormack on August 16, 1897, incorporated the Kootenai River Transportation Company, and commenced building a new steamer, J.D. Farrell, which was launched on November 8, 1897, and completed over the coming winter. In the meantime, in January 1898, both Armstrong and Wardner sold out their shares in the International Trading Company, and went north to Alaska to participate in the Klondike Gold Rush, with Armstrong deciding to try his chances at making money as a steamboat captain on the Stikine River then being promoted as the "All-Canadian" route to the Yukon River gold fields.

J.D. Farrell, the largest steamboat ever built on either the upper Kootenay or Columbia Rivers, and sporting such frontier luxuries as bathrooms, electric lighting, and steam heat, reached Fort Steele on April 28, 1898, her first trip up the Kootenay. Built to last ten years, this fine steamer was to run for only a single season on the Kootenay. On June 8, 1898, Captain McCormack was taking J.D. Farrell south through Jennings Canyon in "hurricane" strength headwind, which blew her off course into a rock, knocking a hole in the stern. McCormack managed to get the steamer to shallow water before she sank up to the wheelhouse. Her owners were able to raise J.D. Farrell and make a few more trips that season.

By October 1898 enough rail lines were completed along the upper Kootenay to terminate steam navigation as a competitive transportation method. In particular, the completion of Crow's Nest Railway on October 6, 1898, and development of smelters in the Kootenay region, particularly at Trail, BC, near the southern end of the Arrow Lakes, allowed ore to be routed to smelters by rail, completely bypassing Jennings.

The surviving upper Kootenay boats, North Star, J.D. Farrell, and Gwendoline were laid up at Jennings. (Annerly had been dismantled by then.) J.D. Farrell and North Star were tied up for almost three years at Jennings until finding employment supporting construction of a rail line to Fernie, BC. J.D. Farrell was later dismantled, with engines and machinery being reused on another steamer. (This was the general practice.) North Star was sold back to Captain Armstrong when he returned from his Yukon adventure, and on June 4, 1902, he took her north to the Columbia River on his famous dynamite-aided transit of the decrepit Baillie-Grohman canal. With North Star gone, steamboating on the upper Kootenay ended for good.

Of the last three Kootenay boats, Gwendoline's fate was unique. When Armstrong and Wardner left ITC for the north, James D. Miller was in charge of the ITC boats. Striking on the idea of moving Gwendoline to the lower Kootenay River by rail, where she could be run profitably again, or at least so it was hoped. In June 1899 he had the vessel loaded on three flat cars. Disaster then struck when the vessel was shifted to fit around a trackside rock cut. The boat was moved too close to the edge, flipped off the rail cars and landed in a canyon, which the Libby Press described:

She turned over in the fall and lit on her smokestack and is there now, not worth a bad fifty-cent piece, with her bottom up and flat as a pancake.

== Later operations on the upper Columbia River ==
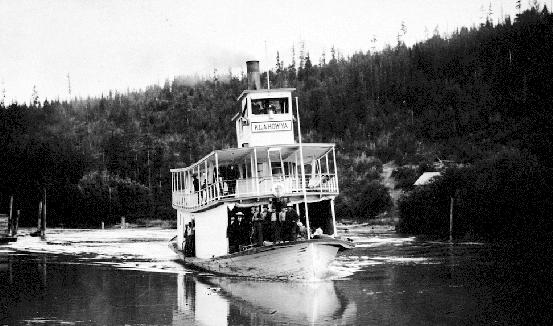
Klahowya, ca 1910, one of the last steamboats built on the upper Columbia River

While Armstrong was on the Kootenay and the Klondike mining booms, a few interlopers had appeared on the upper Columbia. In 1899, H.E. Forster a wealthy politician and occasional steamboat captain, brought Selkirk by rail from Shuswap Lake to Golden, where he launched her but used her as a yacht and not, at least initially, as commercial vessel. Also, Captain Alexander Blakely bought the little sidewheeler Pert and operated her on the river. In 1899 Duchess became involved in the Stolen Church Affair, in which a dispute arose over ownership of a church in Donald, with one party packing up the entire church and moving it to Golden, and disputant party removing the bell from the church while en route to Golden on board Duchess. (The church itself was later moved to Windermere, without the bell.)

In 1902 Duchess was dismantled. In 1903 Captain Armstrong built a new steamer, Ptarmigan, using the engines from Duchess which by then were over 60 years old. In 1911, the same engines were installed in the newly built steamer Nowitka. With the construction of railroads, and economic dislocation caused by Canada's participation in the Great War, steamboat activity tapered off starting about 1915. Steamboat men from the route themselves went to war. Captain Armstrong supervised British river transport in the Middle East, on the Nile and Tigris river. Captain Blakey's son John Blakely (1889–1963), who had trained under his father and Captain Armstrong, went to Europe and was one of only six survivors when his ship was torpedoed in the English Channel.

== Last steamboat runs on the upper Columbia river ==
Nowitka made the last steamboat run on the upper Columbia in May 1920, when under Captain Armstrong she pushed a pile-driver to build a bridge at Brisco NW of Invermere, which when complete was too low to allow a steamboat to pass under it. Armstrong himself had found employment with the Dominion government on his return from the war. He was seriously injured in an accident in Nelson, BC and died in a hospital in Vancouver, BC in January 1923. His own life had spanned the entire history of steam navigation in the Rocky Mountain Trench from 1886 to 1920. In 1948, Captain John Blakely built a sternwheeler of his own, the Radium Queen, which had to be small to fit under the Brisco bridge.

== Modern archaeological investigations ==
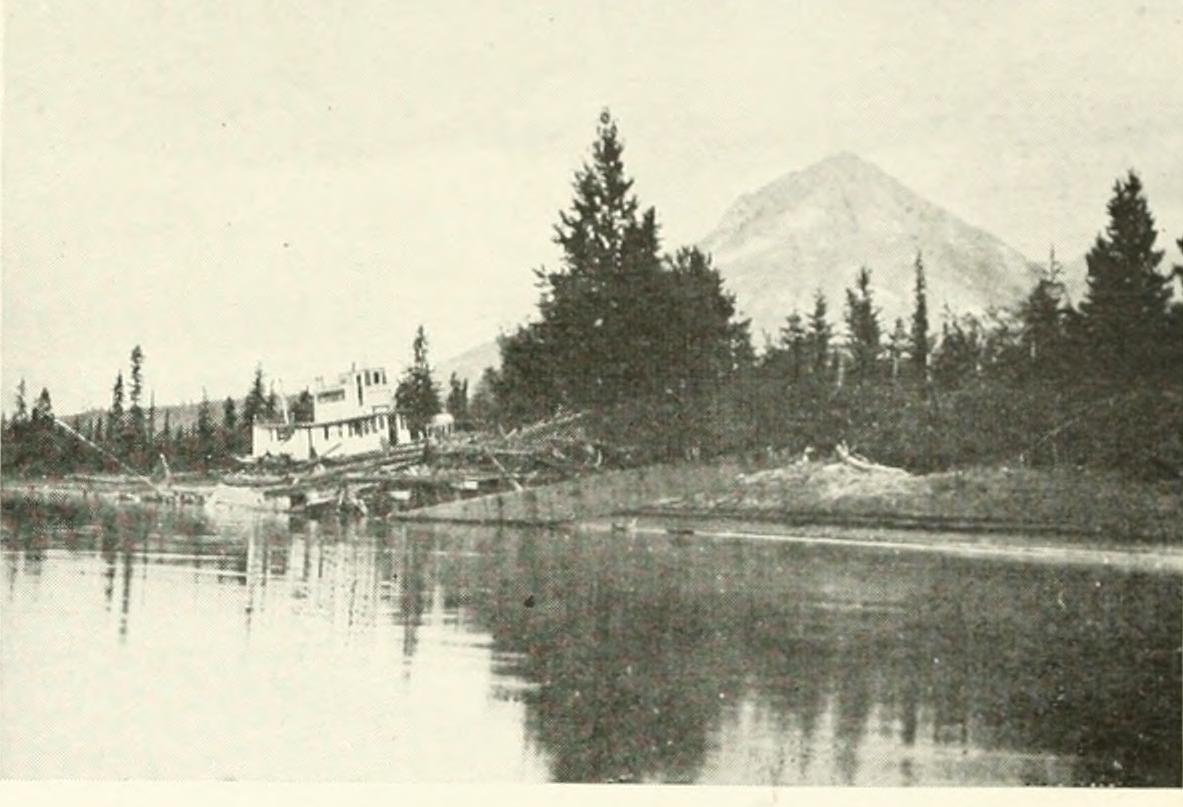
Abandoned sternwheelers at boatyard at Golden, BC. Larger steamer is probably Selkirk, with apparently a smaller vessel (unidentified, behind), c 1920

In April 2001, members of the Kootenay Chapter of the British Columbia Underwater Archaeological Society ("BCUAS") found two previously undocumented wrecks of vessels near the site of the Columbia River Lumber Company mill. The two hulls were buried deeply in mud. Members of the expedition believed one of the vessels was Nowitka. The expedition also located and mapped the wreck F.P. Armstrong which was within 2 km of Columbia Lake. Most of the Armstrong wreck is under 50 to 80 cm of mud. Some tongue and grove panelling, believed to have come from either the decking or the superstructure, was located downstream. The expedition used a metal detector at the site, and the findings indicated that the machinery and boiler had been removed from the hull. Downstream near the Riverside Golf Course, the expedition found a larger wreck, of which 8 meters of hull framing was exposed. The 7 meter beam of the hull was greater than any vessel ever placed on the upper Columbia except North Star. Whether this was a powered vessel or an unpowered barge could not be determined.

== Lists of vessels ==
Steamboats and other vessels on the Upper Columbia River
Name	Year built	Registra- tion #	Mills #	Gross Tons	Reg. Tons	Length	Beam	Depth	Engines	Disposition
Duchess (1886)	1886			32		60 ft (18 m)	17 ft (5 m)	4 ft (1 m)	8" x 30"	Dismantled 1888, engines to Duchess (1888)
Clive	1879			20		31 ft (9 m)	9.3 ft (3 m)	4.0 ft (1 m)	single cylinder 5.5" x 8"	Sank near Spillmacheen 1887.
Duchess (1888)	1888	90800	014610	145.5	99.5	81.6 ft (25 m)	17.3 ft (5 m)	4.6 ft (1 m)	8" x 30"	Dismantled 1901 or 1902, engines to Ptarmigan
Marion	1888	94801	035040	14.8	9.3	61 ft (19 m)	10.3 ft (3 m)	3.6 ft (1 m)	5.5" x 8"	Transferred to Arrow Lakes 1890.
Pert	1890	107826	042920	6.5	4.0	49.8 ft (15 m)	10 ft (3 m)	2.6 ft (1 m)	5" x 6"	abandoned at Windermere Lake 1905
Hyak	1892	100637	024760	39	24.6	81 ft (25 m)	11.2 ft (3 m)	3.9 ft (1 m)	6" x 24"	Laid up 1906
Gwendoline	1893	100805	022400	91	57	63.5 ft (19 m)	19 ft (6 m)	3.2 ft (1 m)	8" x 36"	Returned to Kootenay River, spring 1894 (see chart below for final disposition).
Selkirk 1895	1899	103299	050990	58.5	37.5	62 ft (19 m)	11.2 ft (3 m)	3.6 ft (1 m)	5" x 24"	Abandoned 1917 at Golden shipyard, still visible on ways in 1926
North Star	1897	US 130739		380	265	130 ft (40 m)	26 ft (8 m)	4.0 ft (1 m)	14" x 48"	Transited Baillie-Grohman Canal in 1902 from Kootenay River to Columbia River. Technically under customs seizure at Golden in 1903; laid up and gradually dismantled with parts to other steamers.
Ptarmigan	1903	111950	044870	246.5	155	110.5 ft (34 m)	20.5 ft (6 m)	4 ft (1 m)	8" x 30"	Dismantled 1909, engines to Nowitka.
Isabella McCormack	1908	122399	025730	178	112	94.9 ft (29 m)	18.8 ft (6 m)	3.5 ft (1 m)	7" x 42"	Beached 1910 at Althalmer, BC, and converted to houseboat. Engines to Klahowya.
Klahowya	1910	126946	029880	175	111	92 ft (28 m)	19 ft (6 m)	3.5 ft (1 m)	7" x 42"	Laid up 1915
Nowitka	1913	130604	040720	82	62	80.5 ft (25 m)	19 ft (6 m)	3.5 ft (1 m)	8" x 30"	laid up May 1920
F.P. Armstrong	1913	134032	017430	126	79	81 ft (25 m)	20 ft (6 m)	4.0 ft (1 m)	12" x 72"	Abandoned near Fairmont Hot Springs, BC ca 1920.
Invermere	1912	130892	025370	66		75 ft (23 m)	13 ft (4 m)	4.0 ft (1 m)	propeller-driven, gasoline or diesel engine	
Muskrat (1892)	1892	none	038440			84 ft (26 m)	20 ft (6 m)			Dominion government snag boat

Steamboats on the Upper Kootenay River
Name	Year built	Registra- tion #	Jones #	Gross Tons	Reg. Tons	Length	Beam	Depth	Engines	Disposition
Annerly	1892	US #106963		128	80	92.5 ft (28 m)	16 ft (5 m)	4.4 ft (1 m)		Broken up 1896
Gwendoline	1893	100805	022400	91	57	63.5 ft (19 m)	19 ft (6 m)	3.2 ft (1 m)	8" x 36"	Toppled off flat car during rail transfer to lower Kootenay River, June 1899, fell in canyon and was total loss
Fool Hen	1894									Dismantled, engines to Libby
Libby	1895								steam engine	
Rustler	1896	US 111114		258	196	124 ft (38 m)	22 ft (7 m)	4.0 ft (1 m)	10" x 72"	Wrecked in Jennings Canyon, 1896 for total loss, after being in service only 6 weeks.
Ruth	1896	US 111113		315	275	131 ft (40 m)	22 ft (7 m)	4.5 ft (1 m)	10" x 74"	lost control at The Elbow in Jennings Canyon and demolished in following collision with Gwendoline, 1897
J.D. Farrell	1897	100687		359	226	130 ft (40 m)	26 ft (8 m)	4.5 ft (1 m)		Dismantled 1903, engines, boiler, fitting and major parts of superstructure to Lake Pend Oreille sternwheeler Spokane (1903).
North Star	1897	130739		380	265	130 ft (40 m)	26 ft (8 m)	4.0 ft (1 m)	14" x 48"	Transited Baillie-Grohman Canal in 1902 to Columbia River. See table above for ultimate disposition.

== See also ==
- Frank P. Armstrong
- Baillie-Grohman Canal
- Steamboats of the Arrow Lakes
- Steamboats of the Upper Fraser River
- Steamboats of the Columbia River
