= Frank P. Armstrong =

Steamboat captain

Captain Frank P. Armstrong
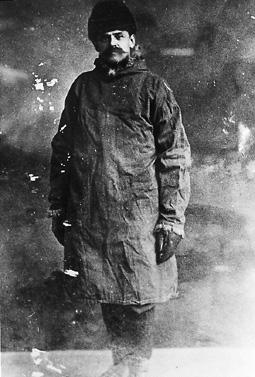
- Born: circa 1859; Sorel, Canada East
- Died: January 1923; Vancouver, British Columbia
- Occupations: Steamboat captain, river guide

Francis Patrick Armstrong (circa 1859–1923) was a steamboat captain in the East Kootenay region of British Columbia. He also operated steamboats on the Kootenay River in Montana and on the Stikine River in western British Columbia. Steam navigation in the Rocky Mountain Trench which runs through the East Kootenay region was closely linked to Armstrong's personality and career. In addition to being a steamboat captain, Armstrong was also a prospector, white-water boat pilot and guide in the Big Bend country of the Columbia River.

== Early life ==
Armstrong had been born in Sorel, Quebec about 1859. He moved to Winnipeg in 1881, and then came west working with a Canadian Pacific Railway surveying crew in the Columbia Valley from Cranbrook to Golden, British Columbia.

== Character ==
Lewis R. Freeman, a journalist, adventurer, movie-maker, and football coach, came to know Armstrong well in 1920 during a boat trip down the Columbia. Freeman described Armstrong, and as "one of the most picturesque personalities in the pioneering history of British Columbia":

Short, compact, but cleanly-built, with iron-gray hair, determined jaw, and black piercing eyes, he has been well characterized as "the biggest little man on the upper Columbia". Although he confessed to sixty-three years he might well have passed for fifty ... .

== Beginning of steam navigation ==
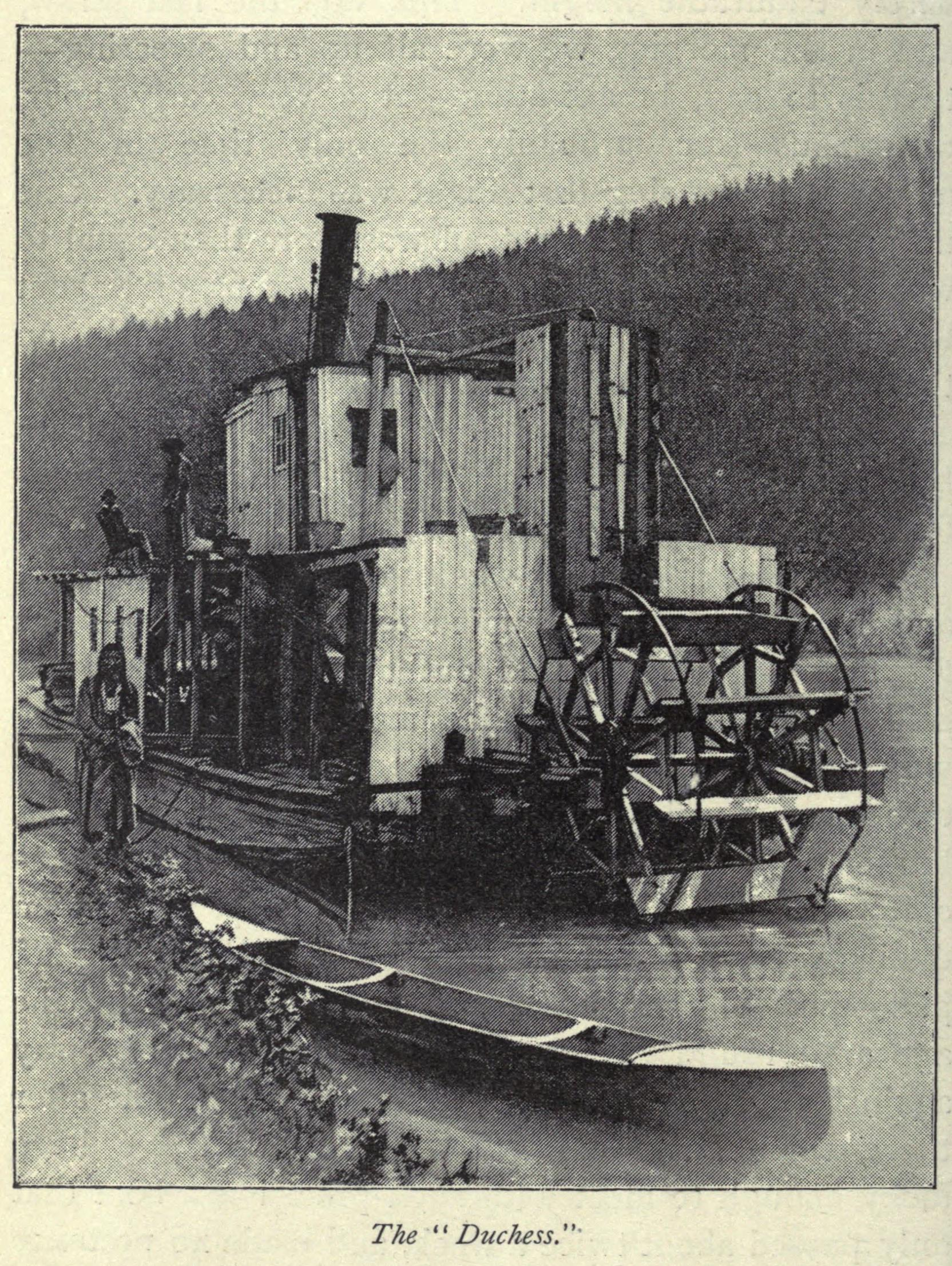
Duchess, steamboat, near Golden, BC 1887. A member of the First Nations. possibly serving as a crewman, is also shown near the steamer.

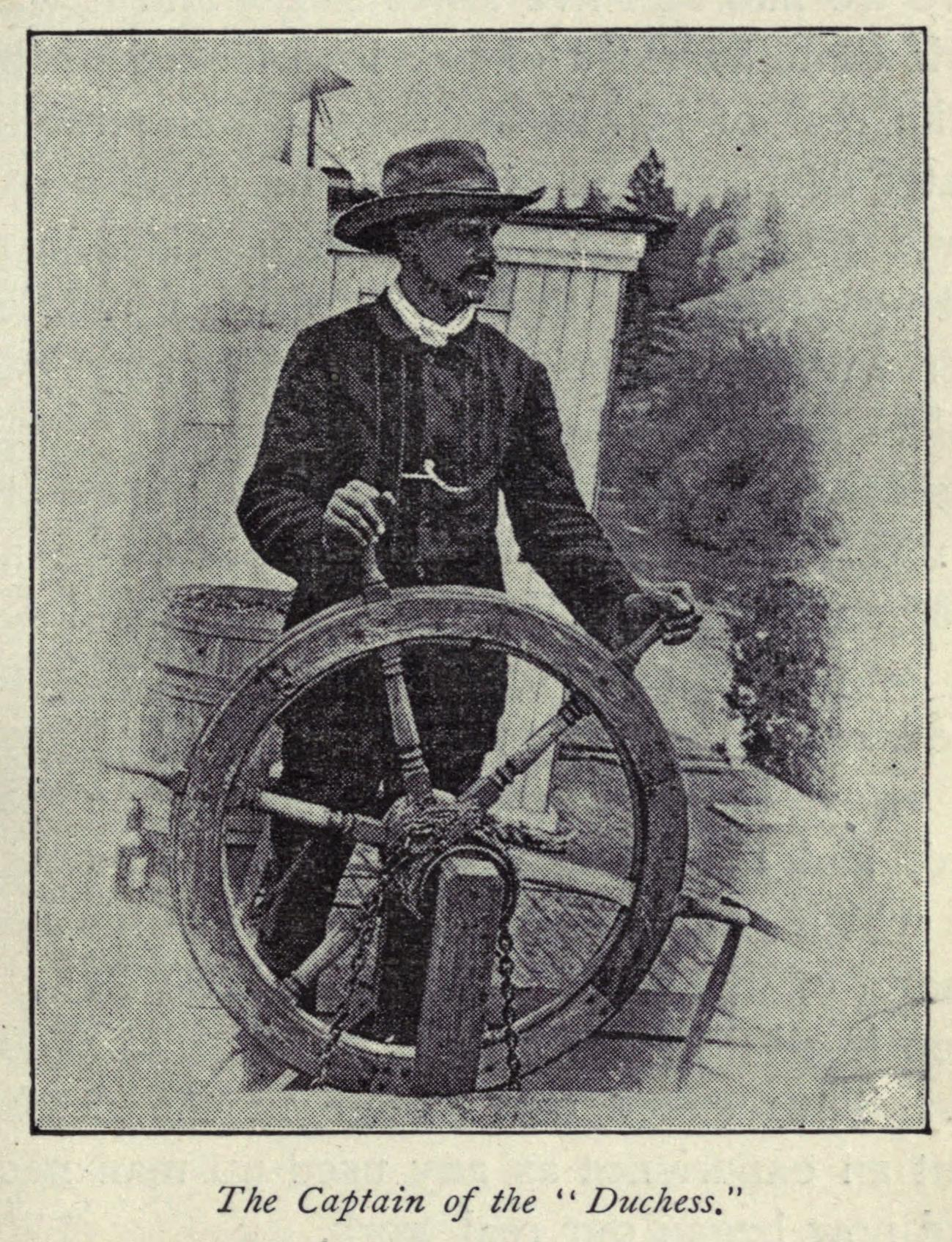
Frank P. Armstrong at the helm of Duchess, 1887

In 1882 Armstrong homesteaded 320 acres (1.3 km^{2}) on the east side of Columbia Lake and planted potatoes, with the plan of selling them to the workers building the CPR downriver at Golden. He built two flat-bottomed boats, (called "bateaux") to transport his crop on the river. Armstrong decided a steamboat would be a good way to tow the bateaux back upstream. He arranged to have steam engines shipped west from a steam ferry built in 1840 that operated at his home town in Quebec. Once the engines arrived, and a boiler could be located, Armstrong assembled a steamboat from miscellaneous planks and timbers that were lying around at an old sawmill. The result was the Duchess, launched in 1886 at Golden. Two early passengers wrote that her appearance was "somewhat decrepit" and Armstrong himself later agreed that she was "a pretty crude steamboat."

== Building the second Duchess ==
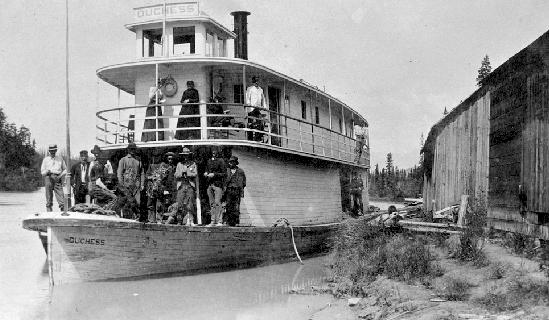
Duchess at Golden, BC, ca 1888

Duchess sank at least once, but Armstrong was eventually able to raise her from the river. He then applied the odd-shaped steamer to make enough money in 1887 to have a new sternwheeler built, also called Duchess. Armstrong hired the veteran shipbuilder Alexander Watson, of Victoria, BC to build the new steamer, which although small, was well-designed and looked like a steamboat. Armstrong also had built a second steamer, Marion, which although smaller than the second Duchess, needed only six inches of water to run in. This was an advantage in the often shallow waters of the Columbia above Golden, where as Armstrong put it, "the river's bottom was often very close to the river's top". In 1890, Armstrong became captain of a third vessel, Pert, who he had refit with sidewheels and an engine.

== The Baillie-Grohman Canal ==
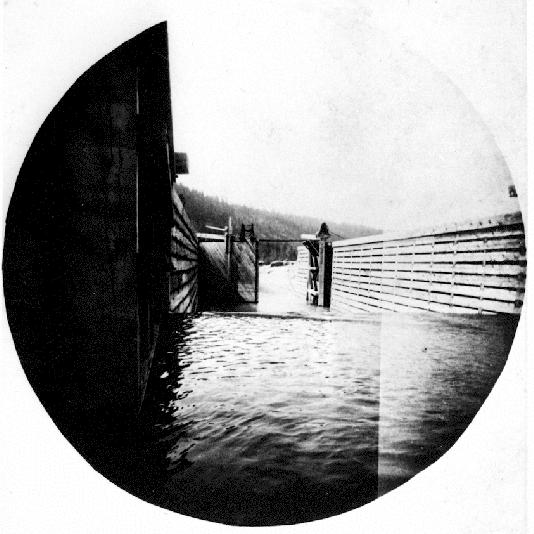
Completed lock at the Baillie-Grohman Canal, ca 1889. Armstrong deliberately destroyed these lock gates in making the transit of North Star through the canal in 1902.

A curious feature of the Rocky Mountain Trench is that two of the major rivers that flow through it, the Columbia, flowing north, and the Kootenay flowing south, are separated by only about a mile of low marshy prairie at a place now known as Canal Flats. As the name implies, a shipping canal was built across Canal Flats by William Adolf Baillie-Grohman, a European adventurer and promoter from wealthy and privileged background. The canal was completed in 1889, but it was only used three times by steamboats, every time under the command of Captain Armstrong.

In 1893, Armstrong built Gwendoline at Hansen's Landing on the Kootenay River, and took the vessel through the canal north to the shipyard at Golden to complete her fitting out. By this time it appears that the canal had been damaged or deteriorated to the boat where at least some of the transit of Gwendoline had to be accomplished by pulling the vessel of the water, partially dismantling the boat, and pulling her along on rollers. Over the winter, Armstrong, it is reported, was able to prevail on the provincial government to expend funds to repair the canal. In late May 1894 Armstrong returned the completed Gwendoline back to the Kootenay River, this time transiting normally the rehabilitated canal.

The canal remained unused until 1902, when Armstrong brought North Star north from the Kootenay to the Columbia. The transit of North Star was only made possible by the destruction, by dynamite, of the lock at the canal.

== Mining boom on the upper Kootenay River ==
A mining boom along the upper Kootenay river in the early 1890s led to a demand for shipping to transport miners and supplies into, and ore out of, the region surrounding the river. The Great Northern Railway at Jennings, Montana was the nearest downriver railhead for upper Kootenay shipping.

Armstrong moved south from the Columbia to the Kootenay, and built the small sternwheeler Gwendoline at Hansen's Landing, about 12 miles (19 km) north of the present community of Wasa. Instead of taking the ore south to the Jennings, Armstrong's plan was to move the ore north across Canal Flats and then down the Columbia to the CPR railhead at Golden. Armstrong took Gwendoline through the Baillie-Grohman Canal in the fall of 1893 (or rolled her across Canal Flats), fitted her out at Golden, and returned through the canal in the spring of 1894.

The difficulty of moving Gwendoline through the Canal convinced Armstrong that the only feasible route was south to Jennings. By early 1896, Armstrong joined with veteran Willamette River steamboat captain James D. Miller and built Ruth (named after Armstrong's daughter) at Libby, Montana. Ruth was the largest steamer yet to operate on the upper Kootenay River. Later, Armstrong and Miller associated with Wardner, and, when their competitors, DePuy and Jones suffered the misfortune of having their new vessel Rustler (125 tons) sunk after just six weeks of operation, the three men were able to dominate the river traffic.

== Jennings Canyon ==
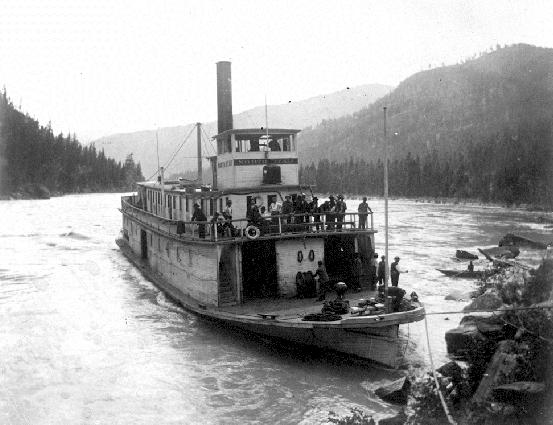
North Star ca 1902. This was the largest vessel ever to operate on the Columbia River above Golden, BC

Once in the United States, the Kootenay river, in its natural state before the construction of the Libby Dam, flowed through Jennings Canyon to the settlement of Jennings, Montana. Jennings has almost completely disappeared as a town, but it was near Libby, Montana. Above Jennings, the Kootenay River narrowed as it ran through Jennings Canyon, which was a significant hazard to any river navigation. A particularly dangerous stretch was known as the Elbow. Jennings Canyon was described by Professor Lyman as "a strip of water, foaming-white, downhill almost as on a steep roof, hardly wider than steamboat".

No insurance agent would write a policy for steamboats and cargo transiting the Jennings Canyon. Armstrong once persuaded an agent from San Francisco to consider making a quote on premiums. The agent decided to examine the route for himself, and went on board with Armstrong as the captain's boat shot through the canyon. At the end of the trip, the agent's quote for a policy was one-quarter of the value of the cargo. Faced with this quote, Armstrong decided to forgo insurance.

The huge profits to be made seemed to justify the risk. Combined the two steamers could earn $2,000 in gross receipts per day, a lot of money in 1897. By comparison, the sternwheeler J.D. Farrell (1897), cost $20,000 to build in 1897. In ten days of operation then, an entire steamboat could be paid for. Armstrong and Miller unsuccessfully tried to get the U.S. Government to finance clearing of some of the rocks and obstructions in Jennings Canyon. Without government help, they hired crews themselves to do the work over two winters, but the results were not of much value.

Despite the work on the channel, every steamboat Armstrong ever took through Jennings Canyon was eventually wrecked in the canyon. The wreck Gwendoline and Ruth on May 7, 1897, resulted in the destruction of Ruth and the sinking of Gwendoline, fortunately with no losses other than severe financial ones. When the new steamer North Star was launched a few weeks later, Armstrong was able to make up for some of the losses with 21 completed round trips on the Kootenay between Fort Steele and Jennings before low water forced him to tie up on September 3, 1897.

== Move to the Stikine River ==
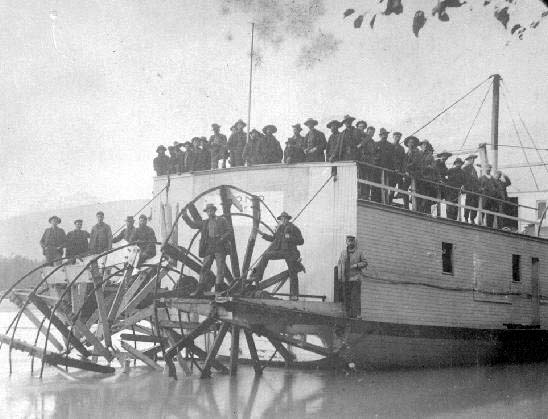
Mono with damaged paddlewheel, possibly at Wrangel, Alaska. Frank P. Armstrong and A.F. Henderson built this vessel, which was initially intended for service on the Stikine River

In January 1898, Armstrong went north to Alaska to participate in the Klondike Gold Rush, with Armstrong deciding to try his chances at making money as a steamboat captain on the Stikine River then being promoted as the "All-Canadian" route to the Yukon River gold fields. On the Stikine River, Armstrong served with the famous steamboat captain John Irving. Together with A.F. Henderson, Armstrong built a steamboat, Mono for the Teslin Transportation Company of Victoria, BC. As might be expected from a vessel designed by Armstrong, Mono had excellent shallow water performance. When the Stikine river route collapsed as an alternate access to the Klondike in July 1898, Mono was taken under tow to St. Michael, Alaska for service on the Yukon River.

== Return to the Columbia River ==
North Star was sold back to Captain Armstrong when he returned from his Klondike adventure, and on June 4, 1902, he took her north to the Columbia River on his famous dynamite-aided transit of the decrepit Baillie-Grohman canal. With North Star gone, steamboating on the upper Kootenay ended for good. While Armstrong had been engaged in the Kootenay and the Klondike mining booms, a few competitors had appeared on the upper Columbia. In 1899, Harold E. Forster (d.1940) a wealthy mountain climber, businessman, politician and occasional steamboat captain, brought Selkirk by rail from Shuswap Lake to Golden, where he launched her but used her as a yacht and not, at least initially, as commercial vessel. Also, Captain Alexander Blakely bought the little sidewheeler Pert and operated her on the river.

In 1902 Armstrong dismantled Duchess. Armstrong built a new steamer, Ptarmigan, using the engines from Duchess which were by then were over 60 years old.

== Service in the Great War ==
Many men from British Columbia served in World War I which began in 1914. Steamboat men were no exception, even Armstrong although he could easily have stayed home because of his age. Instead, Armstrong supervised British river transport in the Middle East, on the Nile and Tigris rivers. The Tigris in particular was in a difficult and hard-fought theater of war. Armstrong was not the only one of the small community of steamboat men of Golden to serve. Armstrong's apprentice, John Blakely (1889–1963), the son of his former competitor, enlisted and went to Europe, where he became one of only six survivors when his ship was torpedoed in the English Channel.

== End of steam navigation on the upper Columbia river ==
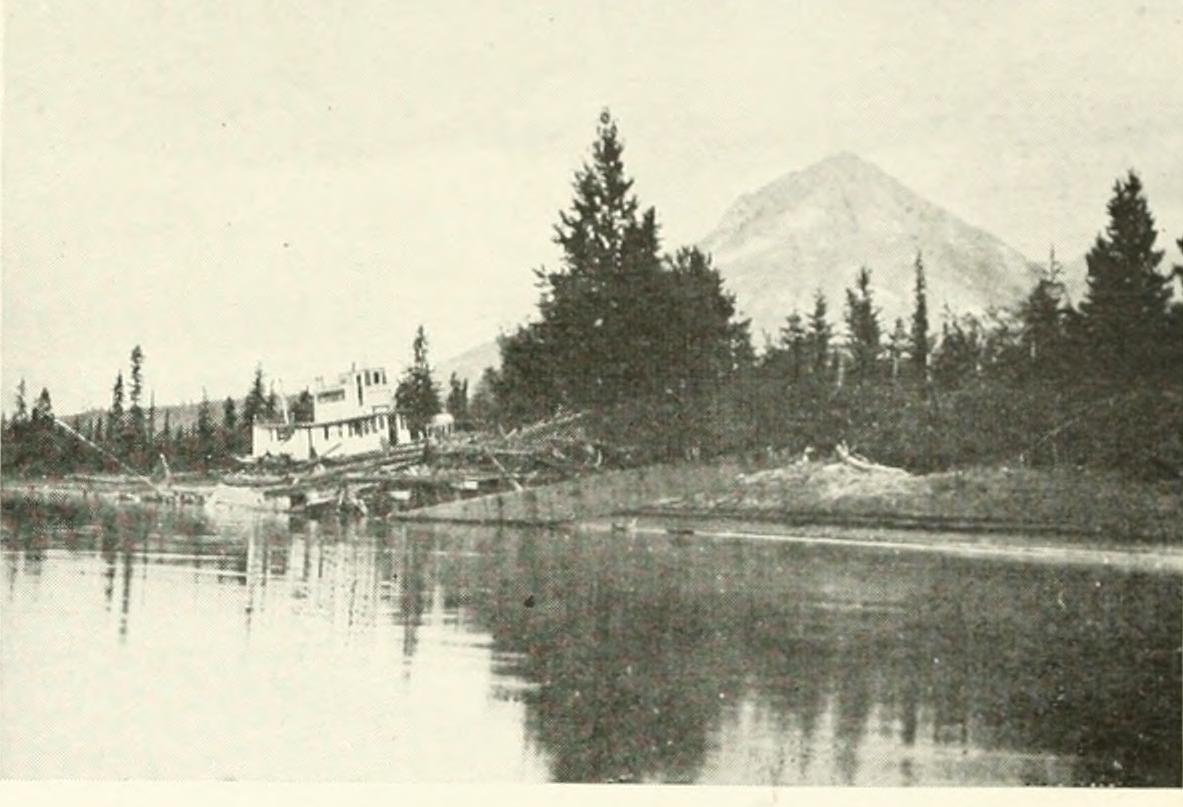
Abandoned sternwheelers at boatyard at Golden, BC. Larger steamer is probably Selkirk, with apparently a smaller vessel (unidentified) behind), ca 1920

The construction of railroads and the economic dislocations caused by the war had doomed steamboats as a method of transportation on the upper Columbia. With Armstrong in command, Nowitka made the last steamboat run on the upper Columbia in May 1920, pushing a barge-mounted pile-driver to build a bridge at Brisco, which when complete was too low to allow a steamboat to pass under it.

== Last years and legacy ==
Armstrong found employment with the Dominion government on his return from the war. He was seriously injured in an accident in Nelson, British Columbia, and died in a hospital in Vancouver, British Columbia, in January 1923. His own life had spanned the entire history of steam navigation in the Rocky Mountain Trench from 1886 to 1920. An older riverman who had known Captain Armstrong said of him: "With Armstrong those who could pay were expected and those who couldn't were never left behind".

== See also ==
- Baillie-Grohman Canal
- North Star (sternwheeler 1897)
- Steamboats of the upper Columbia and Kootenay Rivers
