= Gwendoline (sternwheeler) =

Sternwheel steamer that operated on the Kootenay River

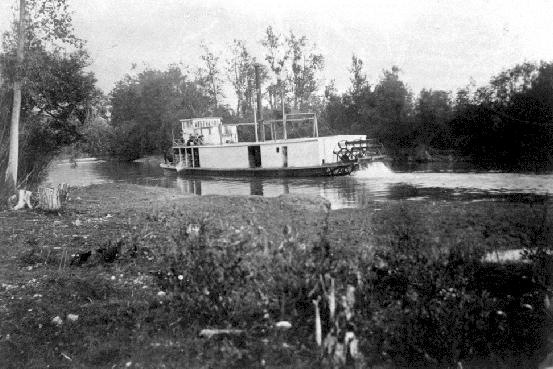
- Gwendoline on the Columbia River ca 1894

History

Canada
- Name: Gwendoline (CAN #100805)
- Owner: Upper Columbia Navigation & Tramway Co.
- Route: Kootenay River in Montana and British Columbia; Columbia River in the Columbia Valley of British Columbia
- Builder: Frank P. Armstrong
- Launched: 1893, at Wasa, BC
- Fate: Fell off flat car into canyon during rail transport in June 1898 and destroyed
- Notes: Wrecked in Jennings Canyon in May 1897 collision with Ruth but returned to service.

General characteristics
- Type: inland passenger/freighter
- Tonnage: 91 gross tons; 57 registered tons
- Length: initial:63.5 ft (19 m); as rebuilt:98 ft (30 m)
- Beam: 19 ft (6 m)
- Depth: 3.2 ft (1 m) depth of hold
- Installed power: twin steam engines, horizontally mounted, 8" bore by 36" stroke, 4.3 nominal horsepower, manufactured by R. McCrae, of Tilsonburgh, Ont.
- Propulsion: sternwheel

Gwendoline was a steam-powered sternwheeler that operated on the Kootenay River in British Columbia and northwestern Montana from 1893 to 1898. The vessel also briefly operated on the Columbia River in the Columbia Valley.

== Design and construction ==
Gwendoline was built in 1893 at Wasa, BC on the Kootenay River for the Upper Columbia Navigation & Tramway Co. of which Capt. Frank P. Armstrong (1859–1923) was a principal.

== Transits of Baillie-Grohman canal ==
Some time between 1893 and 1894, Cpt. Armstrong took Gwendoline north to Columbia Lake and the Columbia River through the Baillie-Grohman canal at Canal Flats, BC. In 1894, Armstrong returned the vessel to the Kootenay River. Gwendoline thus became one of just two steamboats (the other was North Star) to use the canal. Because North Star, being longer than the canal's one lock, had destroyed the lock in order to make her transit, Gwendoline was the only steamboat to use the canal twice, and the only one to use it in a conventional way.

== Operations on Kootenay River ==
In 1896, Gwendoline was operated on the route from Canal Flats to Fort Steele, BC. During this time, the vessel was lengthened from 63.5 ft (19 m) to 98 ft (30 m).

== Wrecked in Jennings Canyon ==
Gwendoline was wrecked in Jennings Canyon in May 1897 in a collision with Ruth, another sternwheeler of the Upper Columbia Navigation & Tramway Co. At the time of the incident, both vessels were bound downriver. Ruth, under Capt. L.B. Sanborn, first entered Jennings Canyon, with 16 passengers and 80 tons of ore on board. Halfway through the canyon, a log caught in Ruth's sternwheel, which threw the vessel out of control, causing her to swing broadside and block the channel. Gwendoline, under Captain Armstrong, came down the river less than an hour later and smashed into Ruth. No one was killed.

There was some talk that Captain Sanborn should have flagged the channel to warn Gwendoline and his statement that a log had jammed in his sternwheel. Still, there was no doubt that the Jennings Canyon presented a significant threat, as five of the six sternwheelers that ever traversed the canyon were damaged or completely wrecked there. By June 1898, Gwendoline had been salvaged, while Ruth was damaged beyond repair.

== Joint operations with Kootenay River Navigation Company ==
During 1898, Captain Armstrong and Captain McCormack combined their efforts on the upper Kootenay, with the Armstrong boats North Star and Gwendoline receiving 60% of the freight receipts, with the balance going to McCormack's single boat J.D. Farrell. James D. Miller (1830-1914) one of the Northwest's most experienced steamboat captains, also commanded Farrell during this time.

== Withdrawal from Kootenay River service ==
The year 1898 was possibly the peak for steamboat activity on the Kootenay River. By the end 1898, business declined sharply on the route as traffic shifted over to newly completed railways. The loss in business caused Gwendoline to be laid up at Jennings from October 1898 to the spring of 1899 with the two other unneeded sternwheelers, North Star and J.D. Farrell.

== Failed transfer and loss ==
In 1898, Captain Armstrong went north to join the Klondike Gold Rush. While he was gone, J.D. Miller (1830-1914) was left in charge of Gwendoline. Miller, one of the most experienced steamboat captains in the Northwest, had the idea of moving Gwendoline by rail around Kootenai Falls. Smaller steamboats had been successfully moved similar distances by rail before, such as Marion and Selkirk. Marion in particular had been moved twice by rail, once in 1890 and again in 1897. The ultimate plan for Gwendoline was to run her on Duncan Lake.

In this case, the execution was flawed. While loaded on two flat cars, the vessel tipped over and fell 70 feet down a canyon, landing bottom side up. The Gwendoline was completely wrecked and never repaired or returned to service.
