= Baillie-Grohman Canal =

Shipping canal in British Columbia, Canada

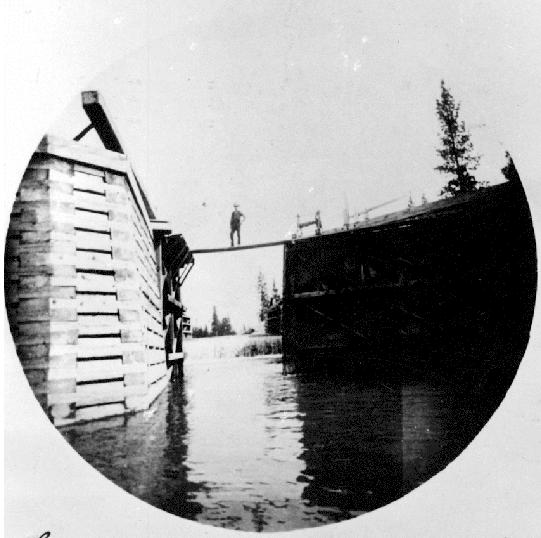
Lock of the Baillie-Grohman Canal, c1890

The Baillie-Grohman Canal was a shipping canal between the headwaters of the Columbia River and the upper Kootenay River in the East Kootenay region of British Columbia at a place now known as Canal Flats, BC. The construction of the canal was required by the provincial government of British Columbia as a condition of the canal's promoter receiving substantial land concessions from the provincial government of British Columbia in the area of Creston, BC. The promoter, William Adolf Baillie-Grohman (1851–1921), was a wealthy adventurer, hunter, author, and business promoter. He declared the canal to be complete in 1889. The canal was an expensive failure, being used only three times during its entire existence. In 1902, on the last use by a vessel, the sternwheeler North Star, the sternwheeler's captain, Frank P. Armstrong deliberately blew out the canal's lower lock gates with dynamite to allow the transit of his vessel.

== Geographic setting ==
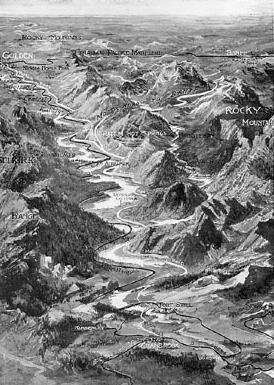
This birds-eye tourist map, published in 1913, gives a rough idea of the potential significance of a shipping canal at Canal Flats, roughly in the center of valley shown on this map.

The Baillie-Grohman Canal was suggested by the unusual geographic setting of the sources of the Columbia and the Kootenay Rivers. The Columbia River begins at Columbia Lake, flows north in the Rocky Mountain Trench through the Columbia Valley to Windermere Lake to Golden, BC. The Kootenay River flows south from the Rocky Mountains, then west into the Rocky Mountain Trench, coming within just over a mile from Columbia Lake, at a point called Canal Flats, where a shipping canal was built in 1889. The Kootenay then flows south down the Rocky Mountain Trench, crosses the international border and then turns north back into Canada and into Kootenay Lake near the town of Creston, BC. (Note: The same river is spelled "Kootenay" in Canada and "Kootenai" in the United States.)

Rail construction in Canada and the United States made steam navigation possible in the Rocky Mountain Trench. There were two important railheads, Golden, BC and Jennings, Montana, near Libby. At Golden, the transcontinental line of the Canadian Pacific Railway ("CPR"), which parallels the Columbia south from the bridge at Donald, turns east to follow the Kicking Horse River, surmounting the Continental Divide at Kicking Horse Pass, then running past the resort at Banff then east to Calgary. Jennings was reached by the Great Northern Railway, built across the Northern United States from Minnesota to Washington by James J. Hill. Between these railheads the Rocky Mountain Trench ran for 300 miles, almost all of which was potentially accessible to steam navigation. Canal Flats was close to the midpoint, being just south of Columbia Lake, 124 miles upstream from Golden.

== William A. Baillie-Grohman ==
In the early 1880s a wealthy European adventurer, William Adolf Baillie-Grohman (1851–1921), travelled to the Kootenay Region and became obsessed with developing an area far down the Kootenay River near the southern end of Kootenay Lake called Kootenay Flats. The problem for Baillie-Grohman was that the Kootenay River kept flooding Kootenay Flats. Baillie-Grohman thought the downstream flooding could be lessened by diverting the upstream portion of the Kootenay River into the Columbia River through the Canal Flats. This would have increased the water flow through the Columbia River, particularly near Golden and Donald, where Baillie-Grohman's proposal, if it had been implemented, would have threatened to flood the newly built transcontinental railroad and other areas of the Columbia Valley.

The provincial government refused to allow the diversion. However, Baillie-Grohman was able to obtain ownership of large areas of land in the Kootenay region, provided he engaged in certain forms of economic development, including construction of a shipping canal and a lock. The lock was necessary because the Kootenay River was 11 feet higher than the level of the Columbia Lake.

== Transport to the canal site ==
Baillie-Grohman arranged to have shipped to Golden a large amount of supplies, including complete equipment for a steam-powered sawmill, which was necessary to cut the lumber to build the canal locks and shelters for the workers at the canal. Baillie-Grohman also had hired a complement of workers, including a skilled millwright, to build the sawmill and supervise construction of the canal. But when the time came to transport the supplies and the people by water to Canal Flats, Duchess, then the only steamer available, was then sunk in the deepest part of the river up to her smokestack.

River transport was the only way Baillie-Grohman could move the heavy sawmill and construction equipment the 124 miles to Canal Flats. The provincial government required Baillie-Grohman to complete the canal by the summer of 1889, then two years in the future. If he did not finish the canal on time, he would not receive the land far downstream. With Duchess under water and no other transport in sight, the clock was running on Baillie-Grohman's dream. There was at this time in Golden a man named Jack Hayes who had collected the pieces of a potential steamboat. These included an unpowered heavy-duty railroad construction barge, a vertical boiler from a Manitoba steam plow, and machinery salvaged from an old tugboat. Hayes however lacked the skill to assemble these components into a steamboat. Baillie-Grohman's only option was to task his millwright to help Jack Hayes complete the Clive.

Clive was much too heavy for the shallows of the Columbia River, which were often choked with snags, that is, dead trees which had become lodged in the bed of the river. Snags could block navigation or sink a vessel that might strike them. Under these conditions, it took Clive 23 days to cover the 100 miles from Golden to the point upriver where the sawmill could be unloaded.

== Construction of the canal and locks ==
As was common for construction projects in western North America at that time, the hard labor of building the canal was done by Chinese immigrant laborers. According to E.M. Sandilands, who worked on the canal, the project was fatally defective from the start, because nothing in the stipulations between Baillie-Grohman and the provincial government required Baillie-Grohman to dredge or prepare the approaches to the canal. All Baillie-Grohman had to do was to build the canal and locks . However, without proper approaches, it would be near-to-useless.

When these were completed, and after a ceremony enhanced by what Sandiland described as "a canoe well laden with the 'good cheer' demanded by such an occasion", Sandiland was ordered by the foreman to break out the false dam which had been keeping the Kootenay River from flooding the works. With the aid of another worker he did so, and thus became, as he later realized, the man who made the entire Selkirk and Purcell mountain range into an island. With the canal in place, this entire huge alpine region was completely encircled by the Columbia River, the Arrow Lakes, the Kootenay Lake and River, and finally the canal itself.

== Size and cost ==
When on July 29, 1889 complete, the canal was 5,049 ft (1,539 m) long and 45 ft (14 m) wide. Baillie-Grohman had raised funds for the venture in England, and was reputed to have sunk a major part of his own considerable personal wealth into the financing syndicate. The locks alone cost $100,000, enough to build five or six steamboats the size of the 1897 upper Kootenay sternwheeler J.D. Farrell.

== Limited use of canal ==
Despite its cost, the Baillie-Grohman canal was only transited three times by steam-powered vessels.

=== Transits of the Gwendoline in 1893 and 1894 ===
In 1893, Armstrong built Gwendoline at Hansen's Landing on the Kootenay River, and took the vessel through the canal north to the shipyard at Golden to complete her fitting out. By this time it appears that the canal had been damaged or deteriorated to the boat where at least some of the transit of Gwendoline had to be accomplished by pulling the vessel out of the water, partially dismantling the boat, and pulling her along on rollers. Over the winter, Armstrong, it is reported, was able to prevail on the provincial government to expend funds to repair the canal. In late May 1894 Armstrong returned the completed Gwendoline back to the Kootenay River, this time transiting normally the rehabilitated canal.

=== Transit of the North Star in 1902 ===
From 1892 to 1898, steamboats transported ore from the mines in the southern part of the Rocky Mountain Trench down the Kootenay River to Jennings Montana. In the fall of 1898, railroads were completed in this area which put the three surviving steamboats out of business, and for the most part they were little used after that. Armstrong, the dominant personality in river transport in the East Kootenay region, had been away steamboating on the Stikine River as part of the Klondike Gold Rush. With no work for North Star on the upper Kootenay when he returned, Armstrong decided in 1902 to bring the vessel through the Baillie-Grohman canal to be worked on the Columbia river side of the trench. It took a month to move North Star through the sloughed-in canal. Among other problems, North Star was 130 feet long, 30 feet longer than the lock. Armstrong solved this problem by ripping out the lock gates, building cofferdams out of ore sacks filed with sand, then blowing out the lower coffer dam with dynamite.

== Deterioration of the works ==
Whatever commercial value the canal may have had was completely wiped out by the dynamite-aided transit of the North Star. The remains of the canal and the lock gradually deteriorated. In 1920, when the journalist-adventurer Lewis R. Freeman visited Canal Flats, he could see traces of the canal running in from Columbia Lake which came to a sharp stop at a collapsing wall of rotting logs, which Freeman believed must have been the remnants of one of the lock gates. M.J. Lorraine, a retired civil engineer, found, photographed and diagrammed a similar situation in 1922.

== Failure of the Baillie-Grohman development scheme ==
Although Baillie-Grohman had completed the canal on time, or at least could claim he had done so, his plan for acquiring ownership of the Creston area failed when the provincial government was found to have exceeded its authority when it entered into the bargain with Baillie-Grohman.

== Image gallery ==
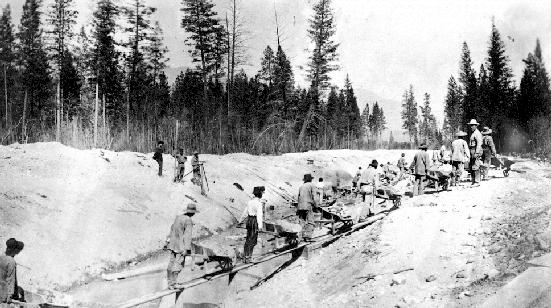
Chinese construction crew at work on canal. Surveyors are shown at upper right.

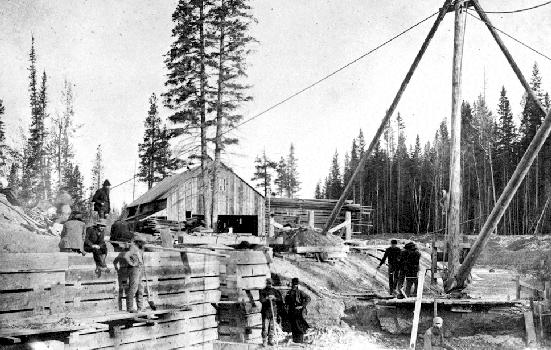
Lock construction at Canal Flats, 1888

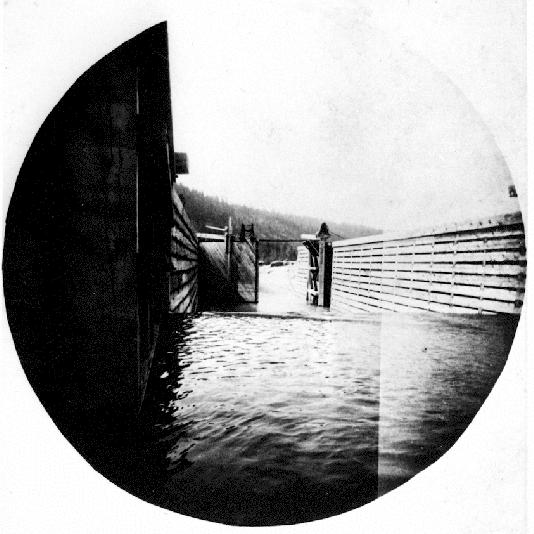
Completed lock at Canal Flats, ca 1889. The timber shown was cut from local ponderosa pine.

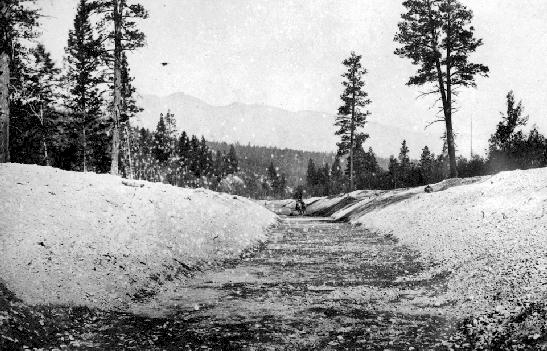
Canal construction, August 1888, possibly the full depth of excavation.

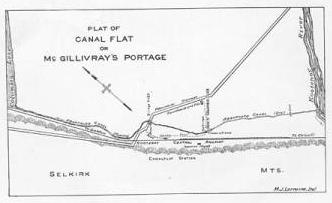
Plan of Baillie-Grohman Canal and Canal Flats c1922

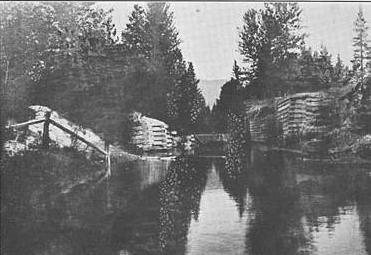
Remains of the lock c1922.

== See also ==
- Steamboats of the upper Columbia and Kootenay Rivers
- Frank P. Armstrong (steamboat captain)
