= North Star (1897 sternwheeler) =

Sternwheel steamer that operated 1897–1903

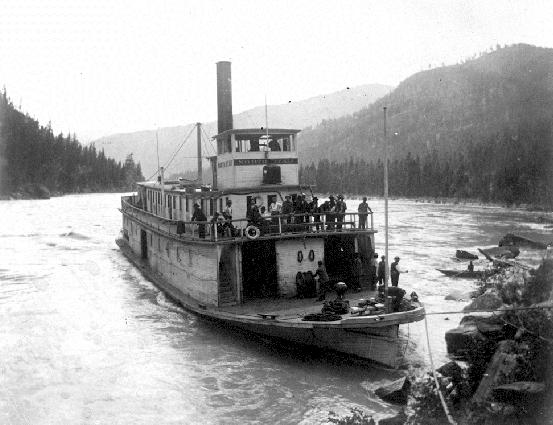
- North Star on the Columbia River

History
- Name: North Star (US #130739)
- Owner: Upper Columbia Navigation & Tramway Co.
- Route: Kootenay River in Montana and British Columbia; Columbia River in Columbia Valley
- Builder: Louis Pacquet
- Launched: 1897, at Jennings, Montana
- Out of service: 1899–1901
- Fate: Out of service at Golden, British Columbia in 1903 due to customs seizure; gradually dismantled thereafter

General characteristics
- Type: Inland passenger-cargo ship
- Tonnage: 380 GRT; 265 NRT
- Length: 130 ft (40 m)
- Beam: 26 ft (7.9 m)
- Depth: 4 ft (1.2 m) depth of hold
- Installed power: twin steam engines, horizontally mounted, 14-inch bore by 48-inch stroke
- Propulsion: sternwheel

North Star was a sternwheel steamer that operated in western Montana and southeastern British Columbia on the Kootenay and Columbia rivers from 1897 to 1903. The vessel should not be confused with other steamers of the same name, some of which were similarly designed and operated in British Columbia and the U.S. state of Washington.

== Design and construction ==
North Star was built by Louis Pacquet, a shipbuilder from Portland, Oregon, for Captain Frank P. Armstrong (1859–1923). Armstrong ran sternwheelers on the Kootenay and Columbia rivers under the name of the Upper Columbia Navigation and Tramway Company (UCN&T). Armstrong's domination of the Kootenay River steamboat business was threatened by the construction of another new steamer, J.D. Farrell by the Kootenay River Navigation Company, a firm with financial backing from Spokane, Washington business interests. North Star was technically owned by American subsidiaries of the UCN&T, first the Upper Kootenay Navigation Company and then the International Transportation Company.

== Operations on the Kootenay River ==
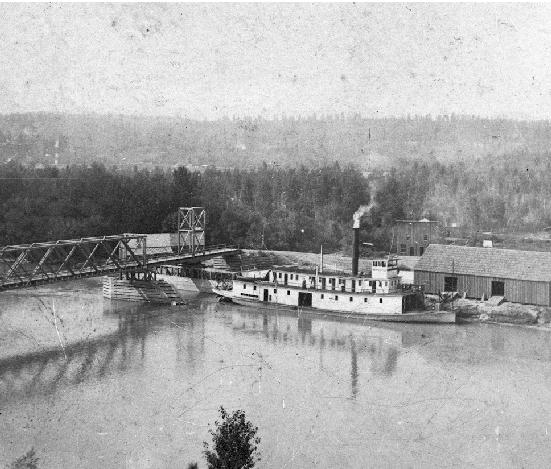
North Star at Fort Steele, British Columbia, probably in 1897 or 1898

In June 1897 North Star started making runs from Jennings, Montana up the Kootenay river to Fort Steele, British Columbia, where significant mining activity was occurring. The route ran through the dangerous stretch of Jennings Canyon where most of the sternwheelers on the upper Kootenay eventually were wrecked or seriously damaged. In April 1898 North Star was likewise wrecked in the canyon. Armstrong was able to raise the vessel and return her to service. (Most of the Jennings Canyon has now been submerged by the waters behind Libby Dam).

== Joint operations with Kootenay River Navigation Company ==
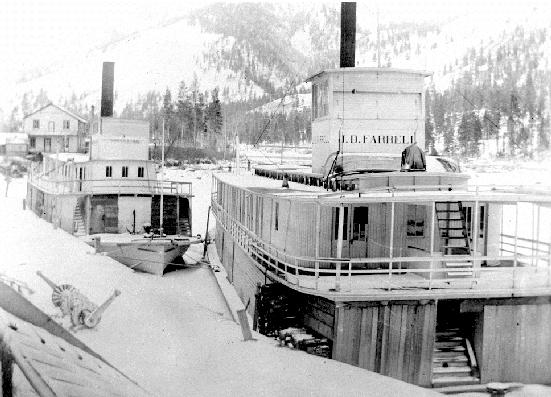
North Star (on left) laid up at Jennings, Montana with J.D. Farrell

During 1898, Captain Armstrong and Captain M. L. McCormack, manager of the Kootenay River Navigation Company, combined their efforts on the upper Kootenay, with the Armstrong boats North Star and Gwendoline receiving 60% of the freight receipts, with the balance to McCormack's single boat J.D. Farrell. In October 1898 railroads were completed in the Kootenay region, and traffic quickly shifted over to the railways, leaving the steamboats without business. North Star was laid up at Jennings, Montana with other upper Kootenay river sternwheelers until 1901, when the A. Guthrie Co. put them back in service to transport supplies for construction of the extension of the Great Northern Railway to Fernie, British Columbia. In late 1901, the railway construction was complete, and North Star and the other steamboats were laid up again.

== Transit of Baillie-Grohman Canal ==
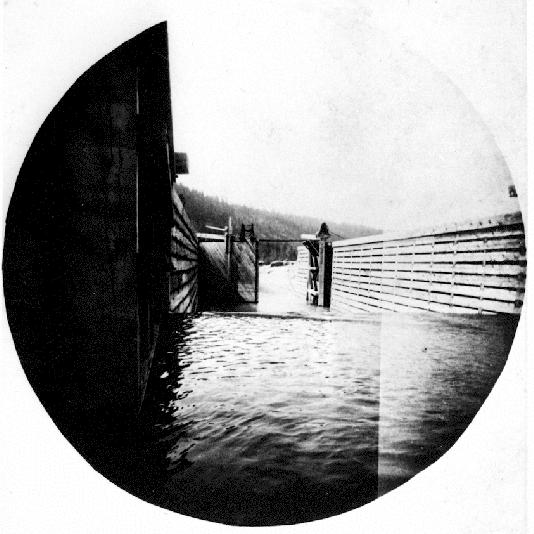
Lock of the Baillie-Grohman canal probably c. 1895. The lock gates shown in this photograph were deliberately destroyed by Captain F.P. Armstrong in bringing North Star through the canal in June 1902.

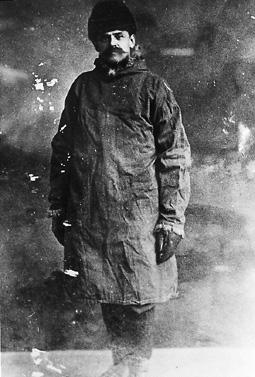
Frank P. Armstrong (c. 1859–1923), captain of North Star

In October 1901 Captain Armstrong bought out the minority interest that Captain James D. Miller (1830–1914) had held in North Star. (Miller had also acted as captain of North Star.) With steamboat business on the upper Kootenay essentially nonexistent, in 1902, Armstrong decided to bring North Star through the Baillie-Grohman Canal at Canal Flats, BC to the upper reach of the Columbia River that began at Columbia Lake and ran down the Columbia Valley to Golden, British Columbia. North Star left Fort Steele on June 4, 1902. North Star was the last steamboat to depart that community, which was in rapid decline because of being bypassed by recent railway construction.

The Baillie-Grohman canal had been used by a steamboat just twice before. Both transits were by the sternwheeler Gwendoline which passed through the canal northwards in 1893 or 1894, and then south again in 1894. Gwendoline was a much smaller steamboat than North Star (63.5 ft (19.4 m) and 90 gross register tons for Gwendoline compared to 130 ft (40 m) and 380 gross register tons for North Star). By 1902, the canal, which for the most part had been dug in soft earth, had sloughed in. Worse for North Star was that the canal included a lock, which was 100 ft (30 m) long. A vessel like North Star which was 130 ft (40 m), could never have passed through the lock under normal conditions. North Star was also 9 inches (230 mm) too wide for the lock. Many at the time considered the task impossible.

The Baillie-Grohman canal was only a little over a mile long, but it was in such poor condition that it took two weeks to coax North Star through it. The brush had overgrown the canal and the water was shallow causing the steamer to scrape bottom. At one point, a tree fell onto the steamer, just missing Armstrong's young daughter Ruth (for whom his steamer Ruth had been named). When North Star came to the lock, Armstrong solved the width problem by simply sawing 5 or 6 inches (130 or 150 mm) off the guards (the thick timber running along the top outside edge of a sternwheeler's hull). The length problem was solved differently. At that time, ore was packed out of mines in the Kootenay country by stuffing oxhides full of the mineral and dragging or sliding the filled hides to the nearest steamboat landing or rail depot. Anderson had a number of oxhides on board North Star and he had them filled with sand and piled up to form temporary lock gates. He then destroyed the existing gates, and when North Star was between the pair of temporary lock gates, he blew the forward temporary gates out with dynamite, and the steamer surged forward with the rush of water into the lower part of the canal.

Once through the canal, a low bridge across the Columbia River blocked the vessel's path. Armstrong hoisted the bridge out of the way with North Star's capstan, then replaced it once the vessel had passed by. North Star finally arrived at Golden on July 2, 1902, thus becoming, with Gwendoline one of the only two steamers ever to operate on both the upper Columbia and the upper Kootenay rivers.

== Operations on the Columbia River and customs seizure ==
Captain Armstrong ran North Star on the Columbia River out of Golden for two seasons, but then the Canadian Customs officials realized Armstrong had not paid custom duties on North Star when he had brought the vessel into Canada permanently from the United States. The vessel was seized by Canadian customs, but in practice this meant that Armstrong was forced take his vessel at Golden until the duty was paid. This apparently did not trouble Armstrong greatly, as he used North Star as a source of spare parts for his other steamboats.
