= Frank Armstrong =

Frank Armstrong may refer to:

- Frank Crawford Armstrong (1835–1909), Confederate general during the American Civil War
- Frank P. Armstrong (c. 1859–1923), Canadian steamboat captain
- Frank Jeremiah Armstrong (c. 1877–1946), American physician
- Frank A. Armstrong (1902–1969), United States Air Force general
- Frankie Armstrong (born 1941), English singer and voice coach
- Frank Armstrong III (born 1944), American financial advisor

== See also ==
- Francis Armstrong (disambiguation)
