= Canal Flats Provincial Park =

Former provincial park in British Columbia, Canada

Coordinates: 50°10′40″N 115°49′5″W

Canal Flats Provincial Park was a provincial park in British Columbia, Canada, located at Canal Flats at the divide between Columbia Lake and the Kootenay River in the province's East Kootenay region. The park had been established in 1981 at approximately 6 hectares in size. In 2004, the park was converted from Order In Council to Statute Designation, and the Provincial park status was cancelled by the Protected Areas of British Columbia Amendment Act, 2009. The land of the Park was provided to the Village of Canal Flats as a Crown Grant, and is now Tilley Memorial Village Park.
