= Francis Armstrong =

Francis Armstrong may refer to:

- Francis Armstrong (missionary) (1813–1897), Scottish Methodist missionary in Western Australia
- Francis Armstrong (mayor) (1839–1899), mayor of Salt Lake City
- Francis Armstrong (captain) (c. 1859–1923), Canadian steamboat captain
- Sir Francis Armstrong, 3rd Baronet (1871–1944) of the Armstrong baronets

== See also ==
- Frank Armstrong (disambiguation)
