= Harold Ernest Forster =

Canadian politician (1869–1940)

Harold Ernest Forster (1869 – September 26, 1940) was a rancher, miner and political figure in British Columbia. He represented Columbia from 1912 until his retirement at the 1916 provincial election as an Independent Conservative.

He was born in Ontario, but both his parents died before he was one year old, and he was raised by a grandmother in Galt, Ontario and uncles who lived near Carlisle, England. Forster travelled with Harold Topham, a British climber, during Topham's visit to the Selkirks in 1890. In 1912, he married Meda Hume. He had purchased a ranch in the upper Columbia Valley in 1898. Forster was the owner of the SS Selkirk, a sternwheeler steamboat that he had transported by rail to the upper Columbia River. He and John Lundy, a house guest, were shot by a Cranbrook man who had asked the two men for liquor and been refused. Forster's house was burned in an attempt to cover up the crime. Frank Sylvester was hanged for the murder of John Lundy the following year.

Mount Forster, Forster Creek and Forster Pass were named after him.
