= Invermere (riverboat) =

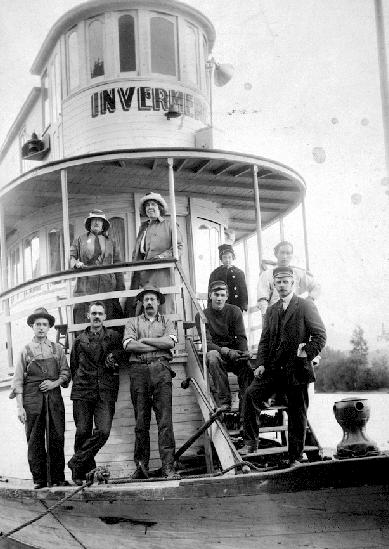
- Invermere and crew, circa 1912

History
- Name: Invermere (CAN 130892) (Mills 025370)
- Owner: Alexander Blakely
- Port of registry: Golden, BC
- Route: Inland British Columbia on the Columbia River in the Columbia Valley
- Launched: 1912 at Golden, BC
- Fate: Removed from registry 1915

General characteristics
- Type: Inland passenger/freighter
- Tonnage: 66
- Length: 75 ft (23 m)
- Beam: 13 ft (4 m)
- Depth: 4.0 ft (1 m) depth of hold
- Installed power: propeller-driven, gasoline or diesel engine
- Capacity: Licensed for 20 passengers

Invermere was a river boat that operated in British Columbia on the Columbia River from 1912 to about 1915. It was named for the town of Invermere.

== Design and construction ==
Invermere was built at Golden, British Columbia, in 1912 by riverboat captain Alexander Blakely Although built in the style of a steamboat, Invermere was powered by a gasoline or diesel engine, then a newer method of marine propulsion. In 1914, Invermere was licensed to carry 20 passengers.

== Operations ==
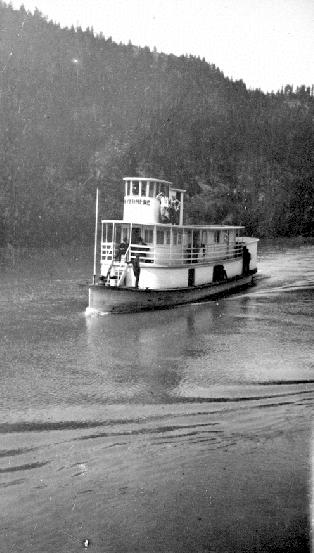
Invermere near Golden, BC, ca 1912

Invermere's owner, Alexander Blakely, was a steamboat captain who operated on the upper Columbia route from Golden to Windermere Lake.

== Dismantled ==
Invermere was removed from the official registry in 1915. Other boats on the river were taken out of service at the same time, as riverboat operations were coming to an end.
