= Frank Armstrong III =

American author

Frank Armstrong III (born June 8, 1944) is an author, a Certified Financial Planner, Chartered Life Underwriter, Accredited Investment Fiduciary Analyst (AIFA) founder and CEO of Investor Solutions, Inc., a National Association of Personal Financial Advisors (NAPFA) registered investment advisor and one of Paladin Registry's Five-Star rated advisors

== Biography ==
Born Francis Charles Armstrong III in Greenwich Village, New York, he grew up in Darien, Connecticut, where he attended Darien High School; after moving to Leesburg, Virginia where he continued his education at Loudoun County High School. He earned a Bachelor of Arts in Economics from University of Virginia, and then joined the United States Air Force. After completing Undergraduate Pilot Training at Moody Air Force Base in Valdosta, Georgia, he was assigned to the Strategic Air Command (SAC) to fly the KC-135, and flew 250 air refueling combat missions in Southeast Asia, meriting an Air Medal with two Oak Leaf Clusters. He left the Air Force in 1973, and spent the next eighteen years as a pilot for Eastern Air Lines, flying Boeing 727, Airbus A300 and Electra aircraft. During much of that time, he worked for Connecticut General Life Insurance Company and in 1983 he co-founded Moring-Armstrong & Co., Inc, a registered investment advisor.

In 1993, Armstrong founded Investor Solutions, Inc., a fee-only investment advisory firm.

== Professional career ==
He began his financial planning career working for Connecticut General Life in Securities and Insurance Sales from 1974–1984. For 8 years following that, he was the Co-Founder and Principal for Moring-Armstrong & Co., Inc. until 1992 when he founded Investor Solutions, Inc., a Registered Investment Advisor, where he currently works.

He is the Chairperson of the Investor Solutions Investment Committee and has been widely quoted in the media, including The New York Times, The Wall Street Journal, CNN's Money Watch and The New Yorker. A frequent contributor to The CPA Journal and Wisconsin Public Radio, He previously served as the financial editor for GNN.com, and as a columnist for Morningstar, Inc.'s website.

== Publications ==
Armstrong has written four books on investment theory and retirement planning. The Informed Investor, was cited by Business Week as a must-read for investors. His first publication, Investment Strategies for the 21st century, was one of the first books published and serialized on the internet in multiple languages. In 2009, he wrote The Retirement Challenge, Will you Sink or Swim? and Save Your Retirement. He also serves as an expert witness for Securities Arbitration, Mediation, Litigation.
