= Bull River, British Columbia =

British Columbian ghost town

Coordinates: 49°28′N 115°27′W

Bull River is a ghost town in the East Kootenay region of British Columbia, located on the east side of the Kootenay River at the mouth of the Bull River.

== Early community ==
The town was created in the 1860s, when coarse placer gold was discovered in the Bull River. The town of Bull River and the river called Bull River were both named after a prospector named Bull who had mined placer along the river called Bull River. The gold disappeared after the turn of the century. Lumber and tie operations in the area kept the town alive after the gold boom ended. The town of Bull River had a hotel called Bull River hotel and a general store.

== Later community ==
The settlement comprises several scattered residences and the Bull River Inn. The Kootenay Trout Hatchery lies to the west.
