= J. D. Farrell =

19th-century passenger steamship travelling the Kootenay River

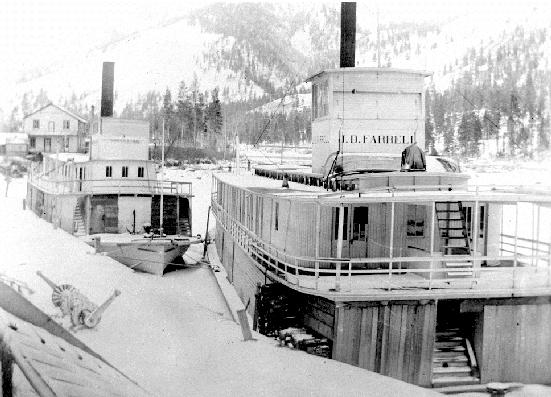
- J. D. Farrell circa 1900, in winter storage at Jennings, Montana, with North Star in background on left

History
- Name: J. D. Farrell (US #77280
- Owner: Kootenay River Navigation Co., A. Guthrie & Co.
- Route: Kootenay River in Montana and British Columbia
- Launched: 1897, at Jennings, Montana
- Out of service: 1899–1901
- Fate: Dismantled 1903, engines and other components to sternwheeler Spokane operating on the Pend Oreille River
- Notes: Wrecked June 4, 1898, but raised and returned to service

General characteristics
- Type: inland passenger/freighter
- Tonnage: 359 gross tons; 226 registered tons
- Length: 130 ft (40 m)
- Beam: 26 ft (8 m)
- Depth: 4.5 ft (1 m) depth of hold
- Propulsion: twin steam engines, horizontally mounted; sternwheel

J. D. Farrell was a sternwheel steamer that operated on the Kootenay River in western Montana and southeastern British Columbia from 1898 to 1902.

== Design and construction ==
J. D. Farrell was designed and built by Captain M. L. McCormack, who had captained steamboats on the Mississippi, St. Croix and Red rivers. He formed the Kootenay River Navigation Company to build and operate the vessel, which he named after J. D. Farrell, a wealthy mining investor from Spokane, Washington. Farrell was equipped with electric lights and bathrooms, then considered innovations in river transport in the region. In contrast to some of the other vessels built in the region, she was competently designed and constructed by skilled shipbuilders brought out from Stillwater, Minnesota.

== Operations ==
J. D. Farrell was launched in November 1897 at Jennings, Montana. At that time the only competitor on this route was the Upper Columbia Navigation & Tramway Company, under Captain Frank P. Armstrong. The construction of Farrell prompted Armstrong to hire veteran shipwright Louis Pacquet from Portland, Oregon to build a comparable vessel, the sternwheeler North Star.

Captain M. L. McCormack commanded Farrell on the vessel's first trip up the Kootenay River to Fort Steele in British Columbia. Farrell worked on the route from Jennings to Fort Steele during 1898. Armstrong and McCormack combined their efforts on the upper Kootenay, with Armstrong's North Star and Gwendoline receiving 60% of the freight receipts, with the balance to McCormack's Farrell. James D. Miller (1830–1914), one of the Northwest's most experienced steamboat captains, commanded Farrell during this time.

On June 4, 1898, with McCormack in command on the seventh trip, Farrell was wrecked in Jennings Canyon when hurricane-force winds blew the vessel off course into a rock. She sank with only her bow and capstan showing above the water. While Farrell was raised and repaired, business declined sharply on the route as traffic shifted to newly completed railways, causing Farrell to be laid up at Jennings from 1899 to 1901. In 1901 A. Guthrie & Co. bought Farrell for $6,000 to use in construction of the Great Northern Railway to Fernie, British Columbia. In the fall of 1901, the railway construction was complete, and Farrell was laid up again.

== Fate ==
In 1903 Farrell was dismantled. The machinery, fittings and much of the upper works were taken by train to Newport, Washington to become part of the sternwheeler Spokane.
