= Canal Flats =

- Village
- Village of Canal Flats
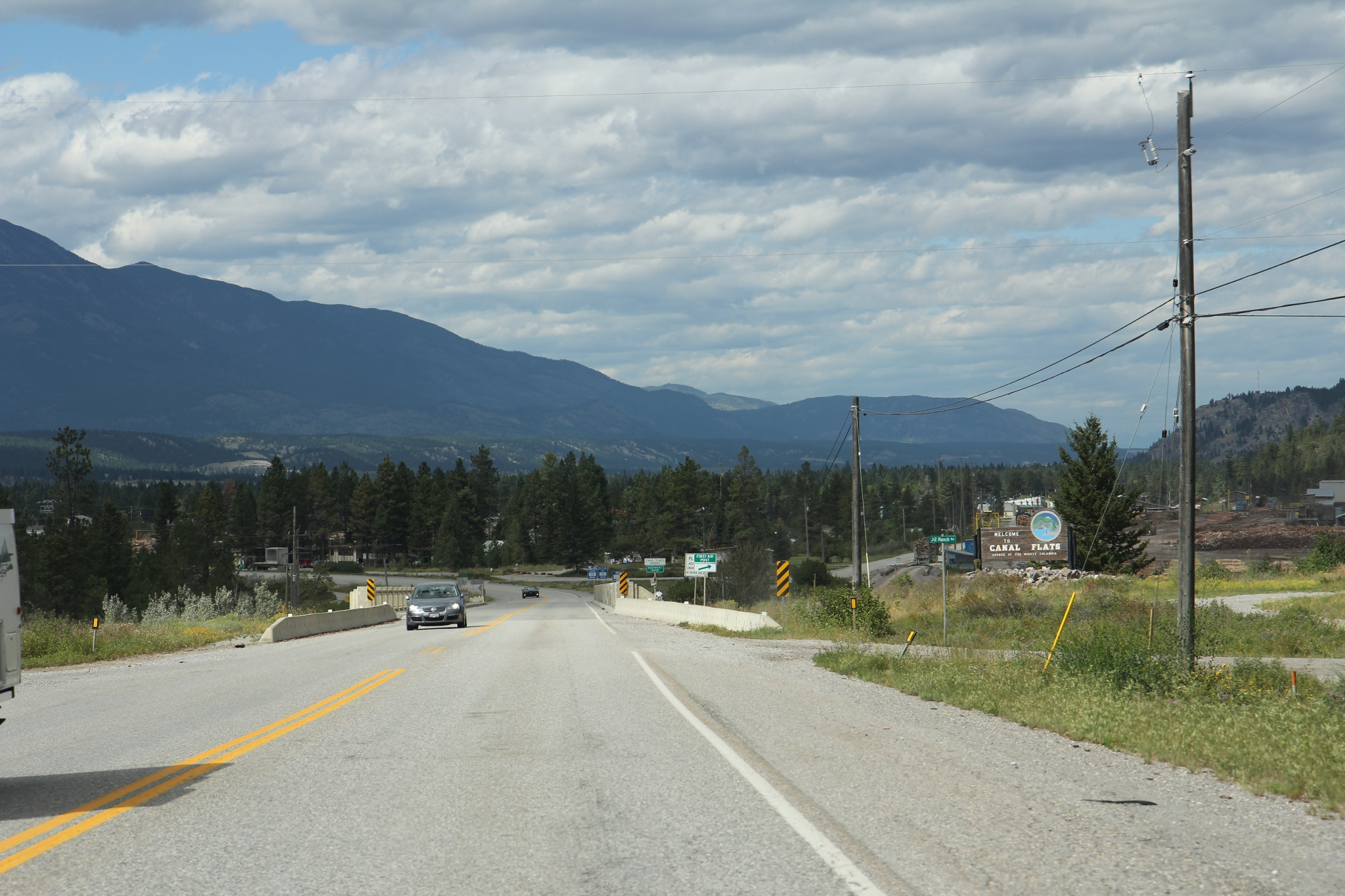
- Highway northward, Canal Flats, 2013

- Location of Canal Flats in British Columbia
- Coordinates: 50°09′36″N 115°48′31″W
- Country: Canada
- Province: British Columbia
- Region: Columbia Valley/East Kootenay
- Regional district: East Kootenay
- Incorporated: 2004

Government
  - Governing body: Canal Flats Village Council

Area
  - Total: 11.07 km^{2} (4.27 sq mi)

Population (2021)
  - Total: 802
  - Density: 72.4/km^{2} (188/sq mi)
- Time zone: UTC-7 (MST)
- Area codes: 250, 778, 236, & 672
- Highways: Highway 95
- Waterways: Columbia Lake, Columbia River, Kootenay River
- Website: Official website

Canal Flats is a village municipality in the East Kootenay region of southeastern British Columbia. This Columbia Valley community lies between the southern end of Columbia Lake and the northwest shore of the Kootenay River. The locality, on Highway 93/95, is by road about 83 kilometres (52 mi) north of Cranbrook and 165 kilometres (103 mi) southeast of Golden.

== First Nations ==
The Ktunaxa Nation has occupied the region around Canal Flats for thousands of years. On a bluff just to the south, remnants of shelter pits evidence a former Ktunaxa salmon fishing camp.

Differing versions exist of the missionary endeavours of Father Pierre-Jean DeSmet of the Jesuits. According to one account, he organized a great assembly at the south end of Columbia Lake in 1845, where he baptized hundreds of tribal members. Afterward, he erected a cross in a prominent place to commemorate the occasion.

Relocated to the village in 2011, a log building to house the Columbia Discovery Centre and Ktunaxa Interpretive Centre opened in 2013.

== Name origin ==
Canoeing upstream, David Thompson reached the headwaters of the Columbia River in April 1808. He named the 1.9-kilometre (1.2 mi) land mass separating the waterways as McGillivray's Portage. Although probably named after Duncan McGillivray, who accompanied Thompson in 1800 in their search for an overland route to the Pacific, other possibilities are Duncan's brothers William and Simon McGillivray. Subsequent interchangeable names have included Columbia Portage or Lake Pass (1858), Howse Portage (1863), Kootenay City (1885), and Grohman (1888). In 1887, Kootenay City comprised a single one-room cabin. In 1892, the townsite was surveyed. In 1897, this name was recycled to promote what would become Procter.

Canal Flat, adopted by 1888, was used interchangeably with the plural version of Canal Flats from 1895. An 1898 reference that lists Grohman as separate from Canal Flats may suggest that the southern portion had a distinct identity for a period. The plural spelling, which first appeared on a map in 1909, gained pre-eminence over time.

== Waterway and roads ==
In 1884, the government called tenders for a ferry across the Kootenay at Upper Crossing. After retendering and negotiations, a charter was awarded to William Adolf Baillie Grohman in 1886.

A wagon road northward from Galbraith's Ferry opened in 1886. Southeastward from Steamboat Landing, and a connecting bridge at Upper Crossing, followed the next year.

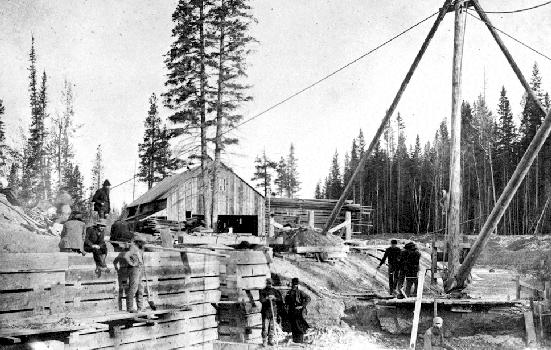
Lock construction, Canal Flats, 1888

Completed in July 1889, the Baillie-Grohman Canal was a barely functional scheme. Giving away 12,000 hectares (30,000 acres) of good land to create a virtually impassable ditch was a notable fiasco of the era. To make the waterways navigable would have required extensive dredging of the two rivers for many miles and a complete rebuild of the 2.4-kilometre (1.5 mi) canal. The downstream falls on the Kootenay were especially problematic. In 1890, a wagon bridge across the canal was destroyed when the canal banks collapsed.

In summertime, the Golden–Fort Steele passenger service, which served the locality, encompassed riverboat, tramway and stage modes. In 1892, the Upper Columbia Navigation & Tramway Co opened the tramway which connected Columbia Lake and Windermere Lake. In wintertime, when river ice shut down river traffic, a stage traversed the whole route.

The 1894 flood destroyed the original 98-metre (323 ft) bridge, which was replaced near year end with a 43-metre (140 ft) Howe truss, a 24-metre (78 ft) Queen truss, and four 6.1-metre (20 ft) pile bents.

In 1897, the 10-kilometre (6 mi) tramway permanently closed. Passengers transferred to a stage for the Windermere–Fort Steele leg.

In 1899, the respective mileages from Golden were Windermere (82.2), Brewer's (95.3), Canal Flat (111.4), and Kootenay Bridge (113.2). In the early 1900s, a substantial replacement bridge appears to have been built adjacent to Canal Flats. In 1911, the relevant listed stopping places were Windermere (82), Fairmont Springs (93), Sante's (106), Wolf Creek/Hanson's (151), and Fort Steele (160).

In 1931, the new bridge comprised two 43-metre (140 ft) Howe trusses. The relief camp at Canal Flats during the Great Depression carried out highway improvements.

In 1950, Highway 4 was renumbered as Highway 95, which was rebuilt in the late 1950s and paving was completed in 1962. In 1966, the highway bridge was replaced by a concrete structure.

== Earlier community ==
Adjacent to the northwest is Thunder Hill, forming part of the Canal Flats area. The hill is first mentioned in an 1891 mining claim. A 2.4-kilometre (1.5 mi) tramway was installed from the 70-ton concentrator to the mine, but work ceased in 1893. The company was wound up the next year. The concentrator was sold for relocation in 1902 but the removal did not eventuate.

The local post offices were called Grohman 1888–1889, Thunder Hill 1893–1913, and Canal Flats 1913 onward.

During the canal construction, a hotel and general store operated. Shacks provided winter accommodation for the 200 workers. Once the construction crews left, the hotel, which Charles J. Brownrigg took over, was too large for likely patronage. The business soon closed, but the 1893 hotel opening by James Durick was welcomed.

Eneas (Enie) H. Small, who became the proprietor of Columbia House, made considerable enlargements to the hotel in 1897 but months later sold the business to John Bullman. That year, the Kootenay Valley Lands Co, the recipient of the 12,000-hectare (30,000-acre) land grant, which included Canal Flats and parcels stretching to the Canada–United States border, began releasing the holdings for sale. Bullman, who also operated a ranch on Thunder Hill and a freight business, found the Kootenay Valley Lands Co (the hotel landlord) obstructive. The final mention of the hotel was 1900, when Douglas Grainger was the proprietor.

During an episode of insanity in 1901, the Hon. Francis John Lascelles, twelfth child of Henry Lascelles, 4th Earl of Harewood, murdered the Chinese cook at his Thunder Hill ranch. Acquitted at trial, Lascelles was returned to the custody of his family in England.

By 1906, all that remained of the Grohman townsite was an abandoned hotel. The next year, Enie Small repaired his Canal Flat summer resort hotel for operation. The next mention is a further rehabilitation for opening in November 1909. In 1910, F.W. Reeves was the manager, and Lord Hindlip purchased property to build a summer house and develop the Thunder Hill Ranch.

In 1913, E.H. Small erected a two-storey, 35-room hotel at a new site to accommodate railway construction crews. The next year, the premises were granted a liquor licence, and Fred A. Small built a general store.

In 1915, William J. McFarlane bought the hotel, which was destroyed by fire the following year. About this time, Dennis Greenwood bought the general store, which by 1922 also sold gasoline. In 1925, A.H. MacKinley purchased the business. Renamed Canal Flat Roadhouse, meals were served and a liquor licence was pending. A series of owners followed. In 1929, a new school opened, and a provincial police post was established, indicating that the arrival of the large Canadian Pacific Railway (CP) mill had brought a permanence to the community.

In 1930, an offender charged with trapping without a licence fatally shot the game warden in front of the general store. A jury found him not guilty on account of momentary insanity. That year, a fire destroyed two stores, a pool room, and rooming house. In 1931, over 200 men successfully fought a forest fire that threatened the CP sawmill, station, and section house. Destroyed were the CP warehouse, police residence and few small shacks. A month later, a fire at Wheeler Motor Garage burned down the building and an adjacent restaurant.

In 1967, a radio repeater antenna was relocated to Windermere

The Canal Flats Airstrip, which existed from the late 1960s until the mid-1980s, was decommissioned when the paved more modern Fairmont Hot Springs Airport opened.

In 1985, a nearby wildfire forced an evacuation of about 1,400 residents.

== Railway ==
The Kootenay Central Railway (KCR) was a CP subsidiary. In 1913, Burns and Jordan, the prime contractor for the railway construction, employed a large force in the vicinity. In November 1914, the last spike was driven near the north end of Columbia Lake. In January 1915, the inaugural passenger train arrived on the commencement of a through service.

Train Timetables (Regular stop or Flag stop)
	Mile	1916	1919	1929	1932	1935	1939	1943	1948	1953	1955	1960	1963
Fairmont Hot Springs	77.1					Regular	Regular	Regular	Regular	Regular	Regular	Mixed	Nil
Radium	76.8	Flag	Flag	Regular	Regular								
Environ	69.2	Flag	Flag										
Columbia Lake	68.8			Flag	Flag	Flag	Flag	Flag	Flag	Flag	Flag	Mixed	Nil
Canal Flat/s	64.1	Regular	Regular	Regular	Regular	Regular	Regular	Regular	Regular	Regular	Regular	Mixed	Nil
Torrent	52.6	Flag	Flag	Regular	Regular	Flag	Flag	Flag	Flag	Flag	Flag	Mixed	Nil
Skookumchuck	46.3	Flag	Flag	Regular	Regular	Regular	Regular	Regular	Regular	Regular	Regular	Mixed	Nil

In 2021, a southbound freight train struck the rear trailer of a fully loaded logging truck at the Thunderhill Road railway crossing. Although damages were extensive, no injuries were sustained.

== Forestry ==
In 1888, a steam sawmill was installed for the duration of the canal construction.

In 1910, Canal Flats camps, under the oversight of T.G. Procter, took out 1,200,000 metres (4,000,000 ft) of logs for transportation to the Crow's Nest Pass Lumber Co mill.

In 1928, CP erected a warehouse at Canal Flats. Construction began on a logging railway up Findlay Creek and a mammoth mill northeast of the station. The next year, the CP planing mill followed the relocation of the CP sawmill from Bull River. The logging railway advanced farther up Findlay Creek, and the Crow's Nest Lumber Co also laid tracks toward Canal Flats along the main road from the south.

During the early 1930s, CP operated several small tie mills in the area.

A 1.6-kilometre (1 mi) spur led to the several yard tracks at the sawmill, which was owned by Crestbrook Forest Industries in the 1970s and Canadian Forest Products on closing in 2015 with the loss of 75 jobs.

== Later community ==
Census population: Canal Flats
Year	Pop.	±%
2001	754	—
2006	700	−7.2%
2011	715	+2.1%
2016	668	−6.6%
2021	802	+20.1%
Source: Statistics Canada

In 2004, the settlement incorporated as a village municipality. That year, the Nature Conservancy of Canada became a conservation partner in the Thunder Hill Ranch.

From the mid-2010s, the village was transitioning from a forestry-dependent economy. To promote tech and trades, the Columbia Lake Technology Center opened in 2018 within the skeleton of the old mill. Two key tenants were PodTech, which manufactured transportable data centres, and Bid Group, which manufactured products such as steel conveyors for forestry companies. The existence of fibre optic infrastructure on site and in town was strategic.

In 2016, Mountain Mercantile opened in the old high school building opposite the arena. A range of boutique small businesses set up on the site, which was also the venue for a local weekend vendors market.

In 2020, the BID Group permanently closed its manufacturing facility. The next year, the village adopted a bylaw to waive the municipal portion of property taxes for new commercial developments.

In 2022, Richard Wayken was appointed as Chief Administrative Officer for the village.

An elementary school, motel, post office, café, and general store/liquor outlet/gas bar exist.

== Demographics ==
In the 2021 Census of Population conducted by Statistics Canada, Canal Flats had a population of 802 living in 362 of its 470 total private dwellings, a change of 20.1% from its 2016 population of 668. With a land area of 11.07 km^{2} (4.27 sq mi), it had a population density of 72.4/km^{2} (187.6/sq mi) in 2021.

== Recreation and entertainment ==
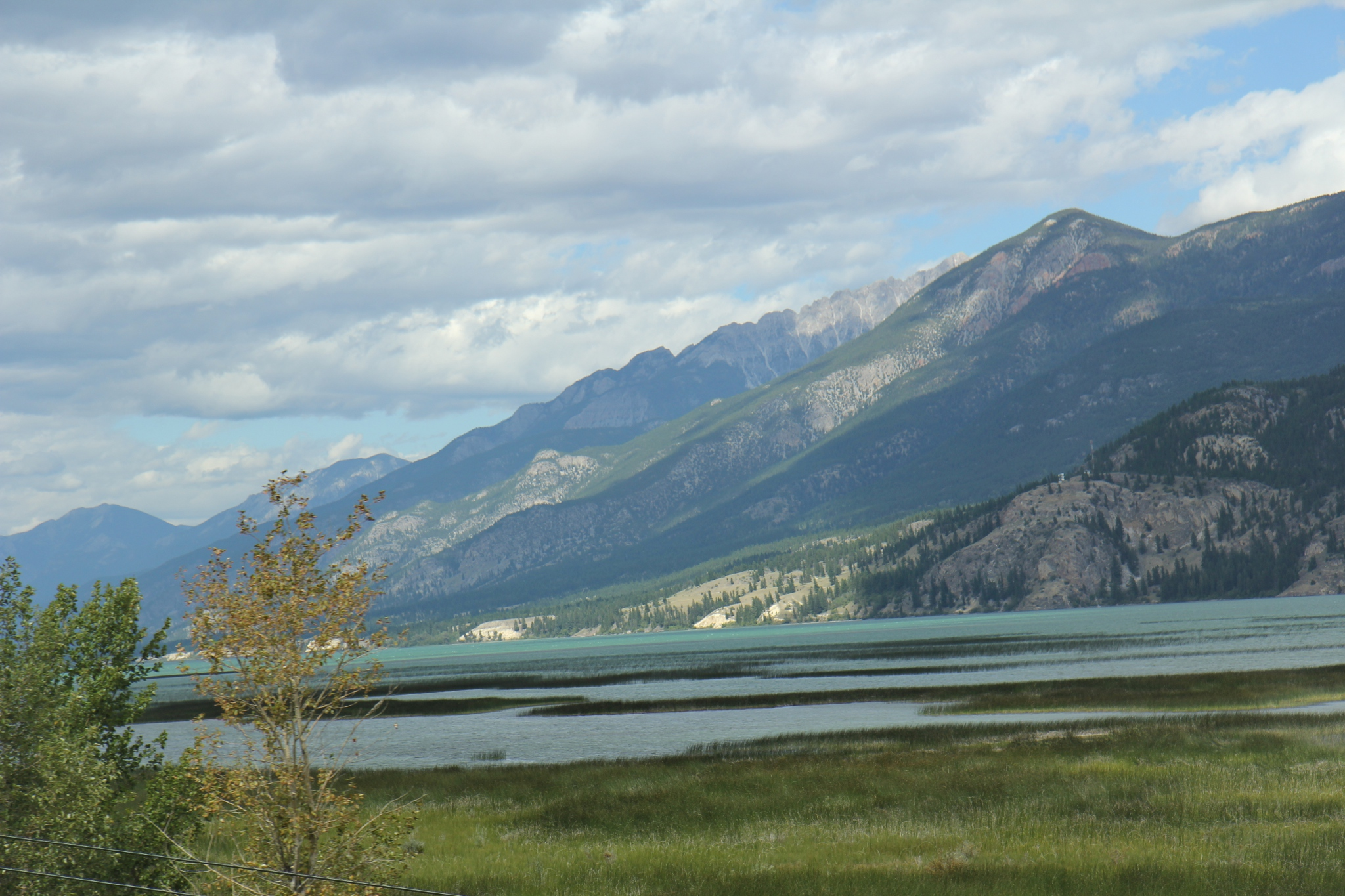
South end of Columbia Lake, 2013

Adjacent to the north is the 1.5-kilometre (0.9 mi) trail forming the Columbia Greenway. To the northwest is Thunder Hill Provincial Park. To the northeast is the Tilley Memorial Park (formerly Canal Flats Provincial Park). Whiteswan Lake Provincial Park is 8 kilometres (5 mi) south.

The Canal Flats Arena (early 1970s) received a major renovation in 2013 and upgrade in 2018. The civic centre (1968), which was expanded in the 1980s, includes a seniors' centre and food bank. In 2021, the new pavilion at the Canal Flats Lions Park opened.

On the first weekend in June, Canal Flats holds the annual Canal Days Party. The program include parades, pancake breakfast, beer garden, food vendors, competitive events, and live music.

== Maps ==
- "Kootenay map". library.ubc.ca. 1899. p. 1.
- "BC map". www.davidrumsey.com. 1925.

== See also ==
- List of francophone communities in British Columbia
