= Selkirk (1895 sternwheeler) =

Early 20th-century steamboat operating in British Columbia, Canada

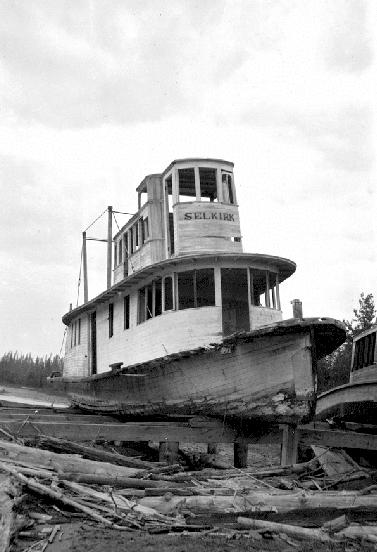
- Selkirk abandoned on the shipways at Golden, British Columbia, c. 1926

History
- Name: Selkirk
- Owner: Harold E. Forster, later, E. N. Russell
- Port of registry: CAN #103299
- Route: Inland British Columbia (Thompson and Columbia rivers)
- Builder: Alexander Watson
- Launched: 1895, at Kamloops, British Columbia
- In service: 1895–1899 (Thompson River); 1899–1917 (Columbia River)
- Out of service: 1917
- Fate: Abandoned at Golden, British Columbia

General characteristics
- Type: inland passenger/freighter
- Tonnage: 58.5 GRT; 37 NRT
- Length: 62 ft (19 m)
- Beam: 11.2 ft (3.4 m)
- Depth: 3.6 ft (1.1 m) depth of hold
- Installed power: initial: twin steam engines, horizontally mounted, 5-inch bore by 24-inch stroke, 2 nominal horsepower, manufactured by BXC Iron Works; after 1906: gasoline engines
- Propulsion: sternwheel

Selkirk was a small sternwheel steamboat that operated on the Thompson and Columbia rivers in British Columbia from 1895 to 1917. This vessel should not be confused with the much larger Yukon River sternwheeler Selkirk.

== Design and construction ==
Selkirk was built by Alexander Watson, an experienced shipbuilder from Victoria at Kamloops, British Columbia for Harold E. Forster, a wealthy man who wanted a steamboat for private excursions in the Kamloops area. The vessel was described as top-heavy.

== Operations on the Thompson River ==
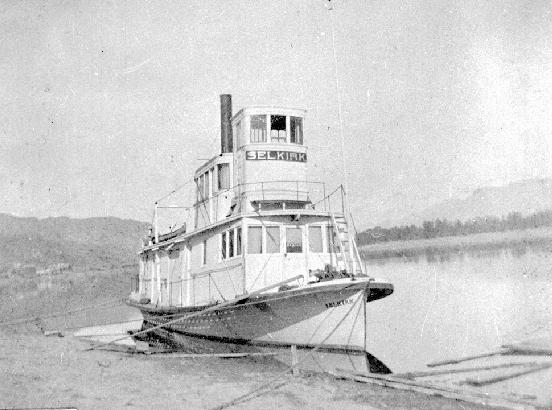
Selkirk in interior British Columbia, c. 1900

Forster operated Selkirk on the Thompson River until June 29, 1898, when 25 miles (40 km) above Kamloops, Selkirk turned into an eddy and capsized. A number of passengers, including some children, were trapped and nearly drowned, but were rescued before the vessel sank. Three months later Forster was able to raise Selkirk. While he was floating the vessel downstream to Kamloops for repair, the boat capsized again, and this time the deckhouse was washed away. Eventually Forster was able to return to Kamloops with the wreck of the steamer.

== Transfer to the Columbia River ==
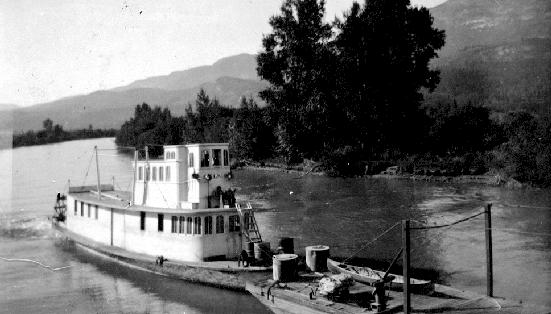
Selkirk on the Columbia River, pushing a barge, c. 1900

Forster did nothing with the vessel until the spring of 1899, when he had Selkirk loaded onto two flatcars and shipped by rail to Golden, on the uppermost reaches of the Columbia River, where the vessel was reconstructed. Forster did not however immediately place the vessel in commercial service. In 1906 gasoline engines were installed in place of the original steam engines. In 1913 Selkirk was sold to Captain E. N. Russell.

== Withdrawal from service ==
Selkirk was withdrawn from the vessel register in 1917. The vessel was hauled out on the ways at Golden, where she was apparently simply abandoned.
