= Columbia Lake =

Lake in British Columbia, Canada

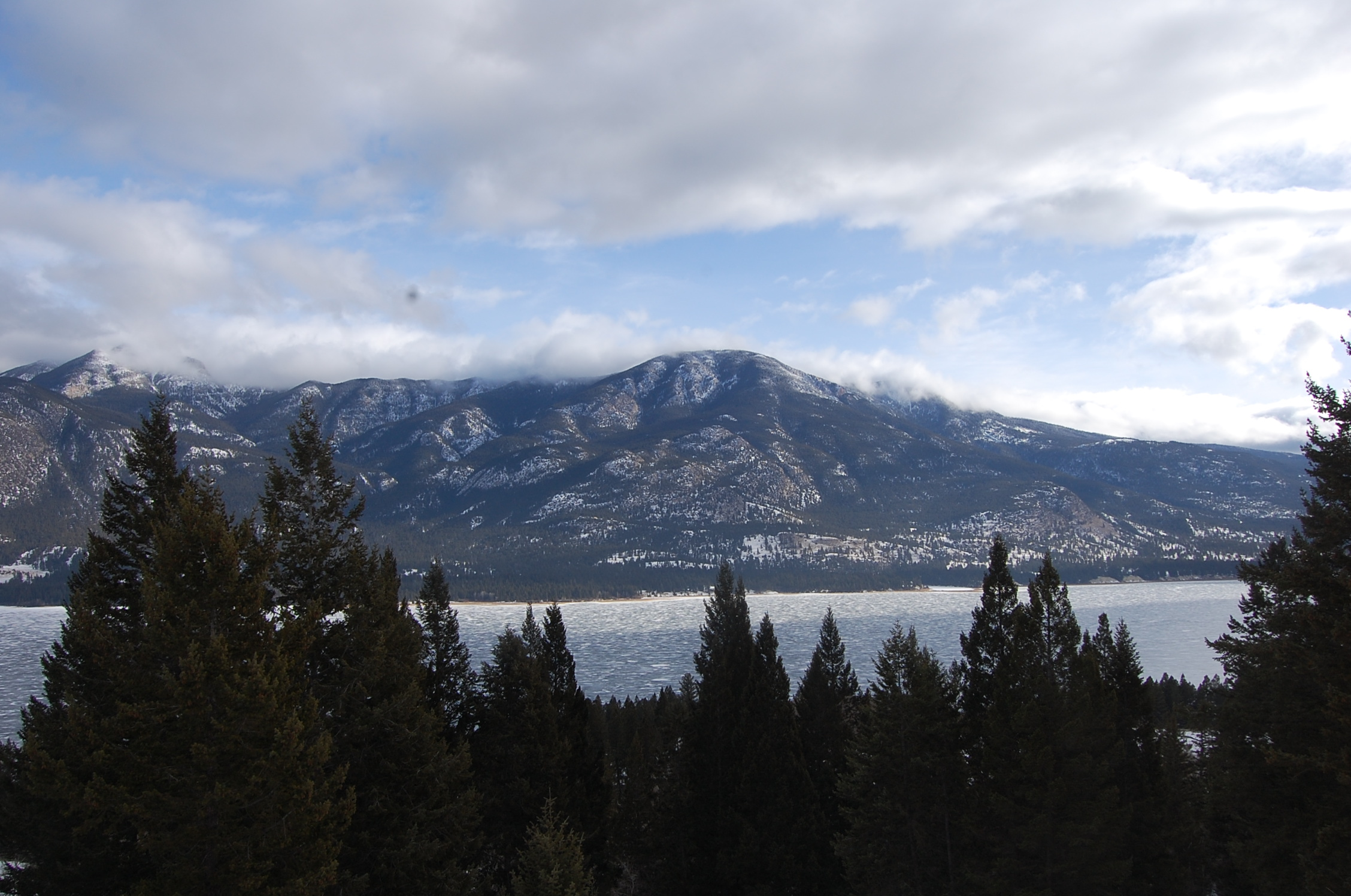

- Location within British Columbia
- Location: British Columbia
- Coordinates: 50°14′N 115°52′W
- Type: natural
- Primary outflows: Columbia River
- Basin countries: Canada
- Max. length: 13.5 km (8.4 mi)
- Max. width: 2 km (1.2 mi)
- Surface area: 25.7 km^{2} (9.9 sq mi)
- Average depth: 2.9 m (9 ft 6 in)
- Max. depth: 5.2 m (17 ft)
- Surface elevation: 808 m (2,651 ft)

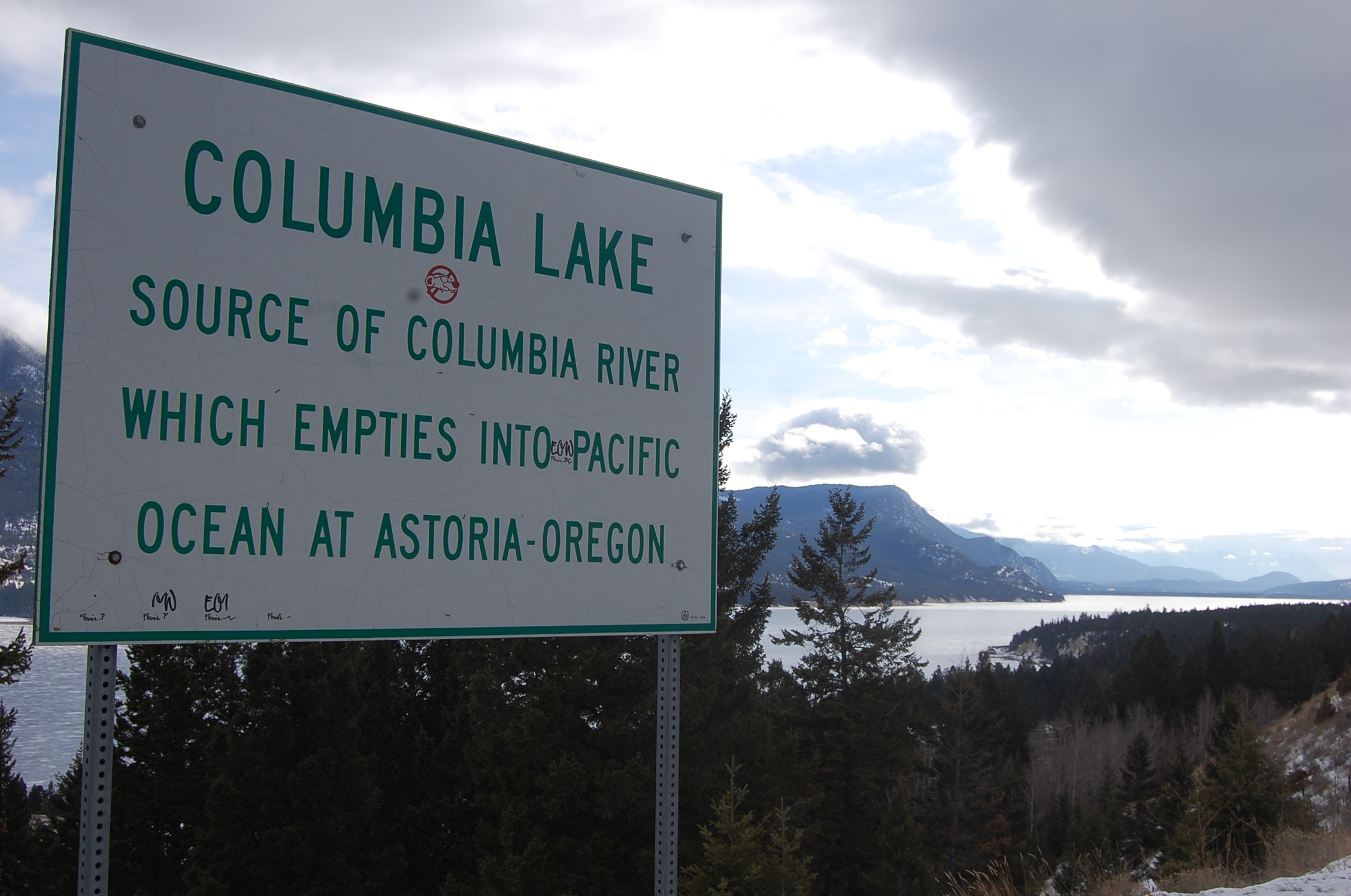
Overlooking Columbia Lake, near Canal Flats, B.C.

Columbia Lake is the primary lake at the headwaters of the Columbia River, in British Columbia, Canada. It is fed by several small tributaries. The village of Canal Flats is located at the south end of the lake.

Columbia Lake is a fresh water lake located along Highway 93 and 95, between the centres of Canal Flats and Fairmont Hot Springs in British Columbia, Canada. Its average July temperature of 18 °C makes it the largest warm water lake in the East Kootenay. It has a mean depth of only 2.9 metres (9 ft 6 in), to a maximum of 5.2 metres (17 ft), with excellent water clarity as it enjoys a much smaller volume of boat traffic than its northern neighbour, Windermere Lake.

The Kootenay River, a major tributary of the Columbia, passes within a few thousand feet of the south end of the lake. In freshets the Kootenay, here already a large stream, sometimes overflows into Columbia Lake, and historically the Baillie-Grohman Canal connected the two bodies of water to facilitate the navigation of steamboats (although only three trips were ever made through it).

== See also ==
- List of lakes of British Columbia
