= Columbia Valley =

Geographic region in southeastern British Columbia, Canada

Coordinates: 51°2′N 116°37′W

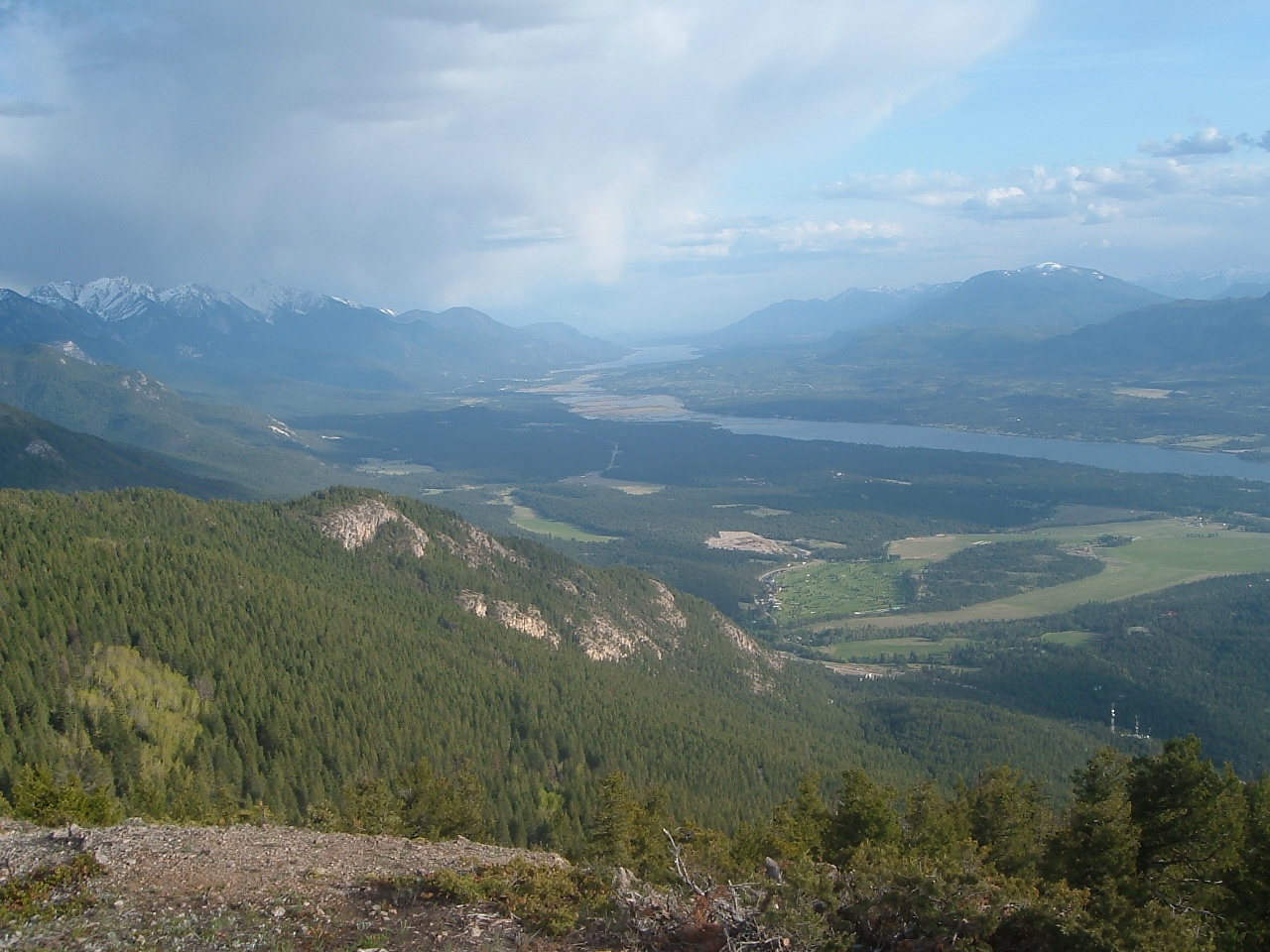
Looking south at Lake Windermere (foreground) and Columbia Lake (background) in the Columbia Valley. The mountains on the left are the Rocky Mountains and on the right are the Purcells

The Columbia Valley is the name used for a region in the Rocky Mountain Trench near the headwaters of the Columbia River between the town of Golden and Canal Flats. The main hub of the valley is the town of Invermere. Other towns include Radium Hot Springs, Windermere and Fairmont Hot Springs. The Panorama Ski Resort is located near the valley.

The Columbia Valley is home to the Columbia Wetlands, a vital link on a major bird migration route.
