= British Columbia Highway 95A =

Highway in British Columbia

Highway 95A
- Kimberley Highway

Route information
- Maintained by the Ministry of Transportation and Infrastructure
- Length: 55 km (34 mi)
- Existed: 1968–present

Major junctions
- South end: Highway 3 / Highway 95 in Cranbrook
- North end: Highway 93 / Highway 95 at Wasa Junction

Location
- Country: Canada
- Province: British Columbia
- Major cities: Cranbrook, Kimberley

Highway system
- British Columbia provincial highways
← Highway 95	→ Highway 97

Highway 95A, the Kimberley Highway, is a 55 km (34 mi) long alternate route to Highway 95 that passes through the city of Kimberley and the community of Ta Ta Creek. The highway was created in 1968, when Highway 95 was re-routed from Highway 95A's current route to a path through the Fort Steele area.

The section of 95A running from downtown Kimberley to Ta Ta Creek is also known as the "Sullivan highway" as that section of highway combined with Ross Street (straight through the traffic light if going southbound) used to lead to the entrance of the Sullivan mine. Now deserted except for tourist season the "Sully" section of 95A is a popular location for those teaching new drivers how to handle curvy BC highways as it features many curves. Every curve in the 100km/h speed limit zone on the Sullivan is properly "banked" and can safely be taken by regular cars, SUVs, and pickups at a full 100km/h in dry weather as the highway was designed for top heavy heavy truck traffic serving the Sullivan mine.

== Major intersections ==
The entire route is in East Kootenay Regional District.

Location	km	mi	Destinations	Notes
Cranbrook	0.00	0.00	Highway 3 / Highway 95 – Fernie, Cranbrook, USA Border	Cranbrook Interchange
	8.39	5.21	Canadian Rockies International Airport	
Kimberley	27.70	17.21	Wallinger Avenue / Ross Street – Kimberley Alpine Resort	
Wasa	55.48	34.47	Highway 93 / Highway 95 – Invermere, Radium Hot Springs, Fort Steele	Through traffic follows Highway 93 north / Highway 95 north
1.000 mi = 1.609 km; 1.000 km = 0.621 mi

== McPhee Bridge ==
49.582344°N 115.798033°W

The McPhee Bridge, also known as the St. Mary's Bridge, rises high above the St. Mary River and is near the Canadian Rockies International Airport and the Shadow Mountain Golf Community. The bridge is used by over 12,000 people each day to travel between Cranbrook and Kimberley. It is right on the city boundary of northwest Cranbrook. The present Bridge was opened on September 26, 1981.

== Photo gallery ==
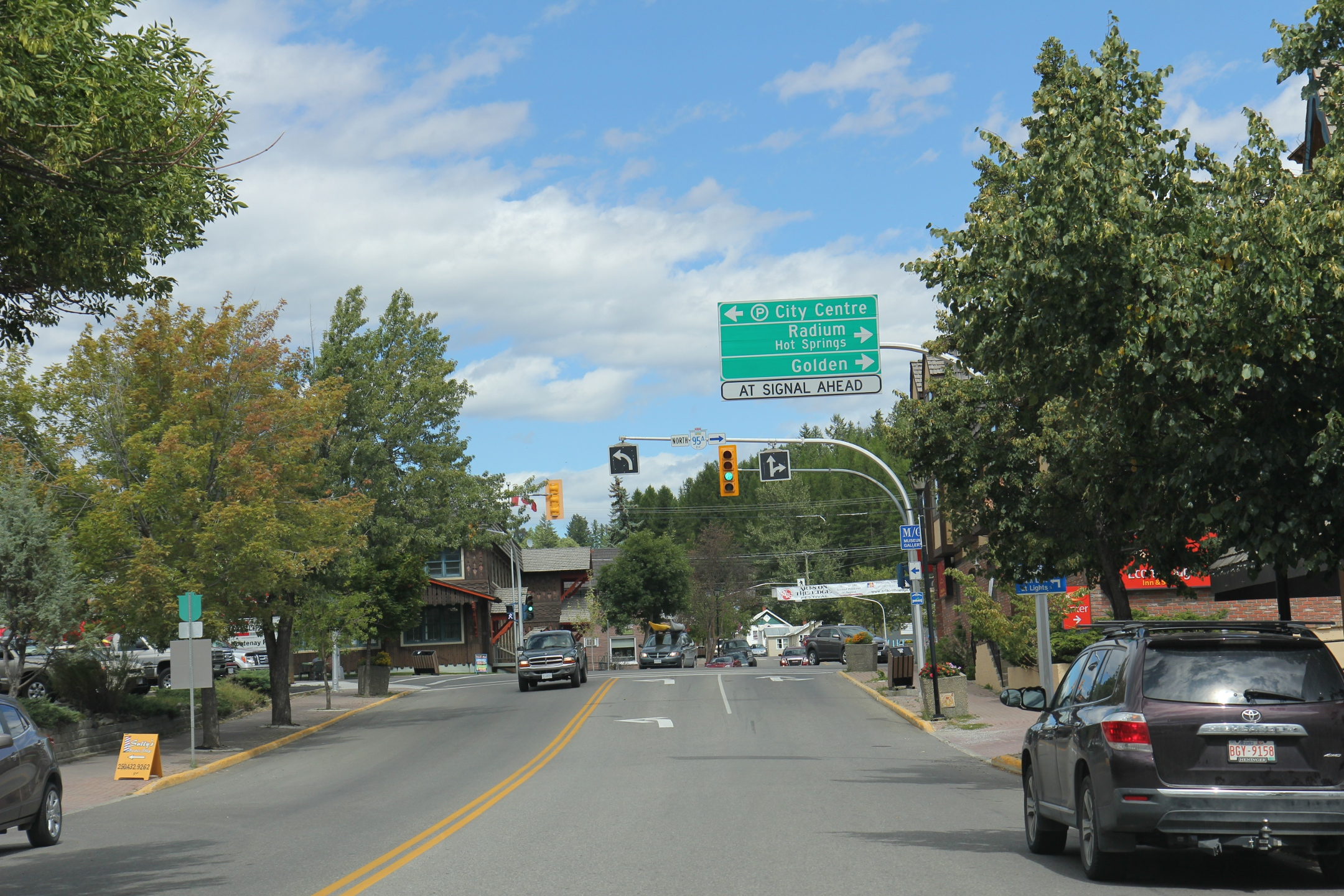
Hwy 95A in downtown Kimberley.

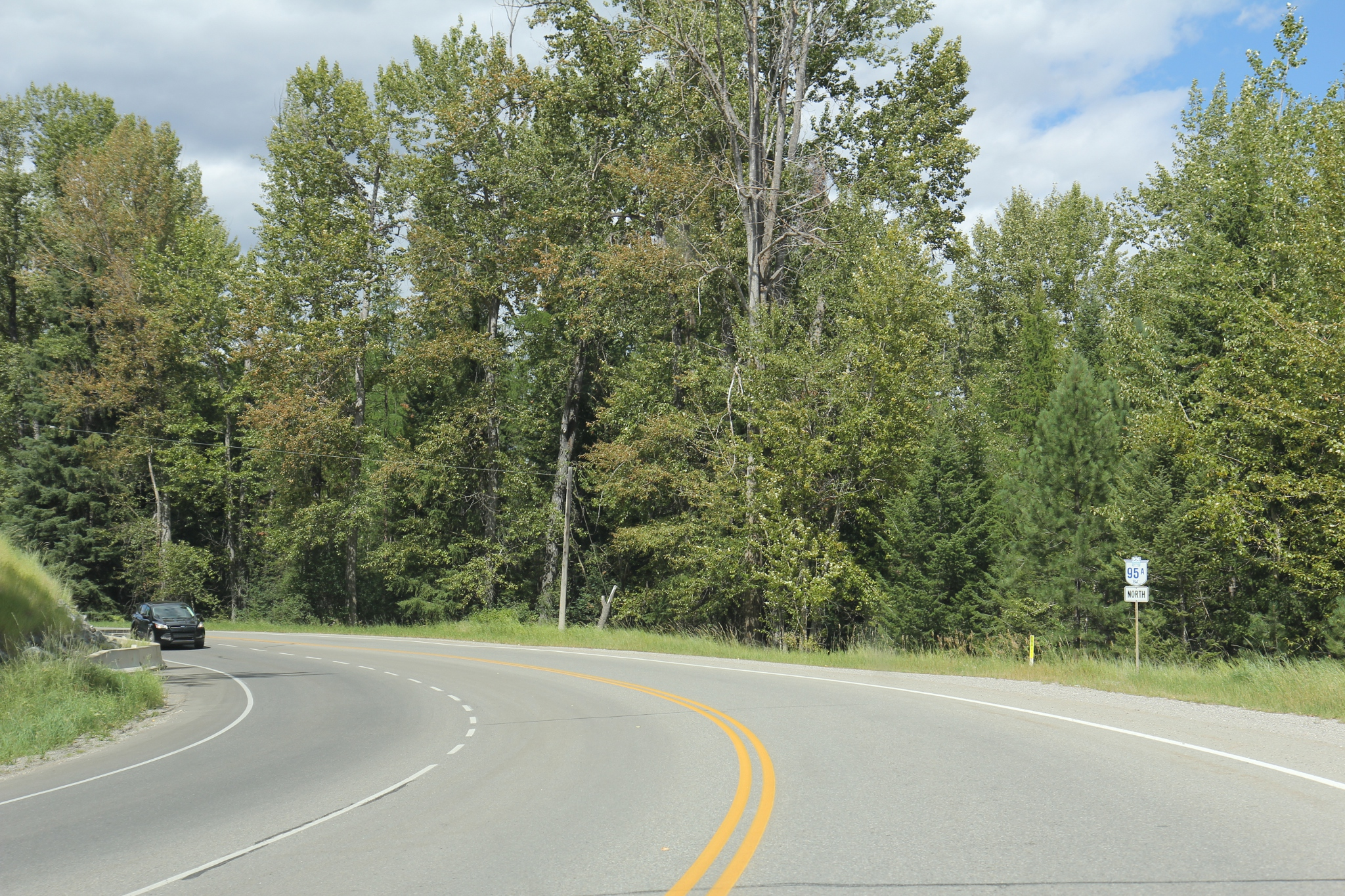
Curve on Hwy 95A.
