= Wasa, British Columbia =

Community in British Columbia, Canada

Wasa
- Location of Wasa in British Columbia
- Coordinates: 49°46′59″N 115°44′03″W
- Country: Canada
- Province: British Columbia
- Region: East Kootenay
- Regional district: East Kootenay

Area
  - Total: 5.65 km^{2} (2.18 sq mi)

Population (2021)
  - Total: 365
  - Density: 64.6/km^{2} (167/sq mi)
- Area codes: 250, 778, 236, & 672
- Highways: Highway 95

Wasa is an unincorporated community in the East Kootenay region of southeastern British Columbia. This place, on the east shore of the Kootenay River north of the mouth of Lewis Creek, surrounds Wasa Lake. The locality, on the merged section of highways 93 and 95, is by road about 36 kilometres (22 mi) north of Cranbrook and 211 kilometres (131 mi) southeast of Golden.

== Name origin ==
Nils Hanson, who reached the district in 1885, purchased land from the Kootenay Valley Lands Co (see Canal Flats) and made pre-emptions, amassing 490 hectares (1,200 acres). To honour his homeland, he chose the name Wasa after either a:

- Swedish king of the House of Vasa
- Swedish battleship Vasa
- Scandinavian place such as Vaasa or Väsa.

The body of water was called Hanson's Lake, which became Hanson (or sometimes Hansen) Lake. Hanson Lake, officially adopted in 1954, changed to Wasa Lake in 1964. Hanson Creek is the outlet to the river.

In the local Ktunaxa Nation, the word Wasa means Horsetail. According to the Ktunaxa creation story, the origins of Wasa, BC could've possibly have been derived from the word.

== Earlier community ==
Hanson undertook ranching and lumber activities. In 1887, he established the first sawmill and by 1901, he had two mills on the west side of the river. By 1896, he ran a general store. That year, he built a fine residence to entertain his guests, who could enjoy the beautiful gardens he was developing. To replace his modest Golden–Fort Steele stage stop, he built a hotel that year, which proved popular on opening early the next year. Rated among the better establishments in BC, the hotel received gas lighting in 1899. These properties were at the southern end of the lake. By 1901, about 20 further buildings made up the surrounding community.

Hanson minted his own coins which were circulated locally. He was the inaugural postmaster 1902–1915.

His original hotel building lasted into the 1920s but had been replaced by a more lavish structure in 1904, which offered running water. A private hydro plant on Lewis Creek supplied electricity.

The arrival of the railway diminished Hanson's freighting business. He had sold his Wasa holdings to the Unionist Investment Co, which failed during World War I, reverting the assets to the Hanson estate.

While Frank Carlson was the hotel manager, the BC Prohibition era of 1916–1920 destroyed business. Pete Matheson was manager when the hotel burned to the ground in 1927. After easily available timber for logging had run out, the main sawmill closed that year. When combined with the shuttering of the Estella Mine, Wasa entered a period of decline.

A modest hotel was soon erected at the southern intersection of Wasa Lake Park Drive but burned down in 1938.

Sleeping in tents, Bible camps were held at the lake in the 1920s. The Anglicans held day camps during the 1930s and early 1940s. The Presbyterians acquired a property in 1948 and erected camp buildings. Camp Wasa closed in 1974, and the property was later subdivided.

Unable to secure a postmaster, the post office was closed 1934–1968. Although smaller sawmills operated over the decades, the community did not revive until the Skookumchuck pulp mill opened in 1968.

In 1945, the community hall was erected. In 1989, the new hall opened at a different site.

A Roman Catholic church camp existed 1957–1980.

In 1958, the BC Hydro transmission lines were extended from Kimberley into the area.

When an interdenominational church was formed in 1982, services were held in the then community hall. In 1986, this property was donated to the church. After the building was demolished, the framework of a new church auditorium opened in 1989. Construction was completed in 1993.

== Ferry, bridges, and roads ==
The early pack trail was northward from Wasa via Wolf Creek Rd, Wasa Sheep Creek Rd, Premier Lake, Sheep Creek (Lussier River), Top of the World, Whiteswan Lake, and the White River to its mouth. A wagon road northward from Galbraith's Ferry opened in 1886. The route initially retained the section northward via Premier Lake, before heading southwestward to Skookumchuck. Stopping places for horse changes, meals, and possible overnight rests were every 13 to 16 kilometres (8 to 10 mi).

In summertime, the Golden–Fort Steele passenger service encompassed riverboat, tramway and stage modes. In 1892, the Upper Columbia Navigation & Tramway Co opened the tramway which connected Columbia Lake and Windermere Lake. In wintertime, when river ice shut down river traffic, a stage traversed the whole route.

By 1896, a ferry operated across the Kootenay just north of Wasa. Assumedly, the ferry continued until the bridge opened.

During an overnight stop at Wasa in 1897, the mail bag, en route to Fort Steele, was robbed and about $1,100 taken. The thief, who was captured within six hours, received a 10-year sentence but served only five years.

That year, the 10-kilometre (6 mi) tramway permanently closed. Passengers transferred to a stage for the Windermere–Fort Steele leg.

To assist his logging operations, Nils Hanson built a toll bridge in 1901 below the southern end of the lake. The 170-metre (560 ft) drawbridge, which had a 12-metre (38 ft) draw, cost $5,000.

In the 1920s, a cross-river cable ferry operated 5 kilometres (3 mi) to the south of Wasa.

The 1928 opening of the Skookumchuck bridge diverted travel immediately north of Wasa from the east shore of the Kootenay to the west one.

Housed in relief camps during the Great Depression, workers reconstructed the road to Kimberley. In 1940, paving was completed on the highway from the Canada–US border via Kimberley to Radium Hot Springs.

In 1946, an overweight logging truck collapsed a section of Hanson's bridge at Wasa. Around 1950, the rail bridge was planked for dual highway use. In late 1955, a narrow two-lane-log stringer-trestle constructed by highways crew opened. Located at the road junction north of Wasa, the cost was $20,000. In 1979, the new four-span 175-metre (574 ft) concrete replacement cost $1.9 million.

== Railways ==
The Kootenay Central Railway (KCR) was a Canadian Pacific Railway (CP) subsidiary. The northward advance of the rail head from Colvalli was near Wasa in September 1914, when a fireman walking along the top of a moving construction train fell between the cars and was killed instantly. That November, the last spike was driven near the north end of Columbia Lake. Through train service commenced in January 1915.

Train Timetables (Regular stop or Flag stop)
	Mile	1916	1919	1929	1932	1935	1939	1943	1948	1953	1955	1960	1963
Canal Flat/s	64.1	Regular	Regular	Regular	Regular	Regular	Regular	Regular	Regular	Regular	Regular	Mixed	Nil
Torrent	52.6	Flag	Flag	Regular	Regular	Flag	Flag	Flag	Flag	Flag	Flag	Mixed	Nil
Skookumchuck	46.3	Flag	Flag	Regular	Regular	Regular	Regular	Regular	Regular	Regular	Regular	Mixed	Nil
Wasa	35.3	Regular	Regular	Regular	Regular	Regular	Regular	Regular	Regular	Regular	Regular	Mixed	Nil
Doyle	29.9	Flag	Flag	Flag	Flag	Flag	Flag	Flag	Flag	Flag	Flag		
Fort Steele	23.0	Regular	Regular	Regular	Regular	Regular	Regular	Regular	Regular	Regular	Regular	Mixed	Nil

The Crowsnest Pass Lumber Co. operated a standard gauge logging railway from a base at Wasa. Track length was 8 kilometres (5 mi) in 1912, 14 kilometres (9 mi) in 1919, and 35 kilometres (22 mi) in 1928. The east shore route went northeast via Premier Lake before turning northwest to reach the Kootenay just north of Torrent. Traffic ceased in 1930, and the three remaining locomotives were dismantled at Wasa for scrap in 1938. A west shore route left the CP track about 9 kilometres (6 mi) north of Wasa. Construction began in 1916. Track length was 16 kilometres (10 mi) in 1924 and 24 kilometres (15 mi) in 1930. One branch went west to the Echo Lake base and the other south to Ta Ta Creek. Traffic ceased around 1930.

== Later community ==
Census population: Wasa Lake
Year	Pop.	±%
1961	75	—
1966	119	+58.7%
1971	355	+198.3%
1976	403	+13.5%
1981		—
1986	278	—
1991	384	+38.1%
1996		—
2001		—
2006	222	—
2011*	279	+25.7%
2016*	340	+21.9%
2021	365	+7.4%
Source: Statistics Canada * Revised figure

Infrastructure includes a church, community hall, general store/post office/gas station, country pub, and motel. The lake is among the warmer in Canada. At the south end is the Wasa Slough Wildlife Sanctuary. A wheelchair and bike accessible trail surrounds the lake. At the north end is the Wasa Lake Provincial Park, which has been a popular family vacation destination since the 1950s.

== Education ==
By 1897, a public school existed at Wasa. The status of the school over the next decade is unclear but did operate from 1907 onward. In 1908, the first Ta Ta Creek school (Moyase) began in a residence. In 1914, the first of a series of Moyase schoolhouses and locations existed. During 1927–1946, Wasa students attended Moyase. During 1946–1963, the Wasa community hall housed classes. In 1963, new school buildings were erected at Wasa and Ta Ta Creek. In 1978, the Wasa school was built on a new site at the north end of the lake, and all the area schools from Skookumchuck to Bummers Flats were closed and consolidated at the new location. Wasa was one of the seven schools closed in June 2002 by School District 6 Rocky Mountain.

== Ta Ta Creek (community) ==
Ta Ta Creek lies across the river to the northwest. Norman (Red) McLeod was a horse thief, who arrived in the East Kootenays in the early 1890s. After his jumping or charging across the creek to escape his pursuers, the common thread of the different anecdotes outlining the incident is his exclamation of "Ta ta" before riding away. Allegedly, Ta Ta Creek, McLeod Creek, McLeod Meadows, and Horsethief Creek were all named for him, but the evidence casts suspicion on all these claims. Any plausible origin of "Ta Ta" remains unclear.

From the late 1890s, Nils Hanson conducted logging operations in the vicinity, which brought the initial Ta Ta settlers.

Opening the first general store in 1923, David Hopkins was the inaugural postmaster 1924–1929. In 1937, Charlie and Edith Crookes opened a store/gas bar and later built a dance hall. The post office alternated between the two stores but closed in 1995.

== Tracy Town ==
About 9 kilometres (6 mi) by road northeast of Wasa on Lewis Creek, is the mouth of Tracy Creek. Prior to 1885, a trail existed northward from Fisherville to facilitate the considerable mining activity on Tracy Creek. In 1895, Frank Tracy and Harry Bradford staked claims, which they called the Estella Group, about 5 kilometres (3 mi) from the future Tracy Town. The town, near the creek confluence, was first settled in 1898. That year, Hanson brought in a sawmill for the construction program, and a road was built to Bummers Flats on the Kootenay. By 1901, the thriving community comprised residences, stores, a community hall, churches, a school, and hotels. By 1910 only a ghost town remained. Consolidated Mining and Smelting conducted exploratory tunnelling 1927–1929 at the Estella mine before abandoning the venture. Another company extracted ore 1948–1952 before calling a halt.

== Bummers Flats ==
Bummers Flats, about 8 kilometres (5 mi) southeast of Wasa, is a local name dating to the pack trail era. In 1864, Bob Dore, en route to Fisherville, camped here. The name origin is unclear. Suggestions have been a shanty town for hobos possibly once existing or the bummer lambs produced by Alfred Doyle's sheep, which grazed on the flats. However, the name was already established at this river ford by 1878, long before Doyle appearing. Ranching has continued on the flats since that time. CP named their flag stop as Doyle when the line opened. On the opposite river bank, North Star Landing accessed the McGinty Trail to Kimberley, which was used 1893–1898 to carry sacks of ore.

== Cherry Creek ferry ==
Mather Creek, formerly called Cherry Creek, is about 9 kilometres (6 mi) southeast of Wasa on the opposite shore. During 1890–1896, ten landowners resided in the vicinity.

Despite the Galbraith ferry charter prohibiting competition 16 kilometres (10 mi) either side, Robert Mather was operating a small ferry across the Kootenay in 1887, which continued throughout the 1890s. At this point, the river could be unpredictable, the east landing submerged, and the ferry hazardous.

The new installation at Cherry Creek in 1921/22 was called the Bechtel ferry, which was subsidized 1926–1935. Charles Bechtel, who lived just above the ferry, was the operator. In 1945, he threatened a passerby with an axe. When the police attempted to draw him from his barricaded cabin, he escaped into the surrounding bush. During a shootout a few days later, a police officer and Bechtel were wounded. Bechtel died in hospital the following day.

== Map ==
1898 area map.

== Notable people ==
- Gavin Hassett (1973–), rower, was a Ta Ta Creek resident 1982–1988.

== Climate ==
Climate data for Wasa
Month	Jan	Feb	Mar	Apr	May	Jun	Jul	Aug	Sep	Oct	Nov	Dec	Year
Record high °C (°F)	12.5 (54.5)	13.5 (56.3)	22.0 (71.6)	27.0 (80.6)	32.0 (89.6)	34.0 (93.2)	37.0 (98.6)	37.0 (98.6)	33.5 (92.3)	24.5 (76.1)	16.5 (61.7)	11.0 (51.8)	37.0 (98.6)
Mean daily maximum °C (°F)	−2.3 (27.9)	1.9 (35.4)	7.9 (46.2)	13.6 (56.5)	18.4 (65.1)	22.1 (71.8)	26.5 (79.7)	25.8 (78.4)	19.6 (67.3)	11.4 (52.5)	2.4 (36.3)	−3.5 (25.7)	12.0 (53.6)
Daily mean °C (°F)	−6.2 (20.8)	−3.2 (26.2)	2.1 (35.8)	6.8 (44.2)	11.3 (52.3)	15.0 (59.0)	18.4 (65.1)	17.7 (63.9)	12.3 (54.1)	5.7 (42.3)	−1.2 (29.8)	−6.8 (19.8)	6.0 (42.8)
Mean daily minimum °C (°F)	−10.1 (13.8)	−8.2 (17.2)	−3.8 (25.2)	0.0 (32.0)	4.1 (39.4)	7.7 (45.9)	10.2 (50.4)	9.5 (49.1)	5.0 (41.0)	0.0 (32.0)	−4.7 (23.5)	−10.1 (13.8)	0.0 (32.0)
Record low °C (°F)	−31.5 (−24.7)	−33.0 (−27.4)	−26.5 (−15.7)	−11.5 (11.3)	−5.0 (23.0)	−1.5 (29.3)	3.0 (37.4)	−2.0 (28.4)	−7.0 (19.4)	−16.0 (3.2)	−31.5 (−24.7)	−35.5 (−31.9)	−35.5 (−31.9)
Average precipitation mm (inches)	25.3 (1.00)	18.6 (0.73)	27.5 (1.08)	37.5 (1.48)	50.9 (2.00)	73.6 (2.90)	48.9 (1.93)	37.8 (1.49)	38.6 (1.52)	25.4 (1.00)	38.6 (1.52)	30.6 (1.20)	453.3 (17.85)
Average rainfall mm (inches)	7.3 (0.29)	5.4 (0.21)	16.3 (0.64)	31.9 (1.26)	50.4 (1.98)	73.6 (2.90)	48.9 (1.93)	37.8 (1.49)	38.5 (1.52)	22.9 (0.90)	19.6 (0.77)	5.8 (0.23)	358.4 (14.11)
Average snowfall cm (inches)	18.0 (7.1)	13.5 (5.3)	11.3 (4.4)	5.5 (2.2)	0.5 (0.2)	0.0 (0.0)	0.0 (0.0)	0.0 (0.0)	0.1 (0.0)	2.5 (1.0)	19.0 (7.5)	24.8 (9.8)	95.2 (37.5)
Average precipitation days (≥ 0.2 mm)	9.7	7.0	9.4	10.2	12.5	14.6	10.3	8.9	8.9	9.0	10.4	9.7	120.4
Average rainy days (≥ 0.2 mm)	2.8	2.6	6.6	9.4	12.6	14.6	10.3	8.9	8.9	8.7	6.3	2.0	93.6
Average snowy days (≥ 0.2 cm)	7.8	4.9	4.2	1.6	0.3	0.0	0.0	0.0	0.1	0.8	5.0	8.3	33.0
