= British Columbia Highway 95 =

Provincial highway in British Columbia, Canada

Highway 95
- Highway 95 highlighted in red.

Route information
- Maintained by the Ministry of Transportation and Infrastructure
- Length: 329 km (204 mi)
- Existed: 1953–present
- Component highways: (1) Yahk–Kingsgate Highway (2) Kootenay–Columbia Highway

Major junctions
- South end: US 95 at the U.S. border at Kingsgate
- Highway 3 in Yahk; Highway 95A in Cranbrook; Highway 3 / Highway 93 near Fort Steele; Highway 95A near Wasa; Highway 93 in Radium Hot Springs
- North end: Highway 1 (TCH) in Golden

Location
- Country: Canada
- Province: British Columbia

Highway system
- British Columbia provincial highways
← Highway 93	→ Highway 95A

Highway 95 is a north-south highway in the southeastern corner of British Columbia, opened in 1957. The highway connects with U.S. Route 95, from which the highway takes its number, at the Canada–U.S. border at Kingsgate, just north of Eastport, Idaho. The section between the Canada-U.S. border and the Crowsnest Highway is known as the Yahk–Kingsgate Highway while the section between the Crowsnest Highway and Golden is known as the Kootenay–Columbia Highway.

Highway 95, one of the most overlapped highways in the province, shares most of its route with other numbered highways.

== Route description ==
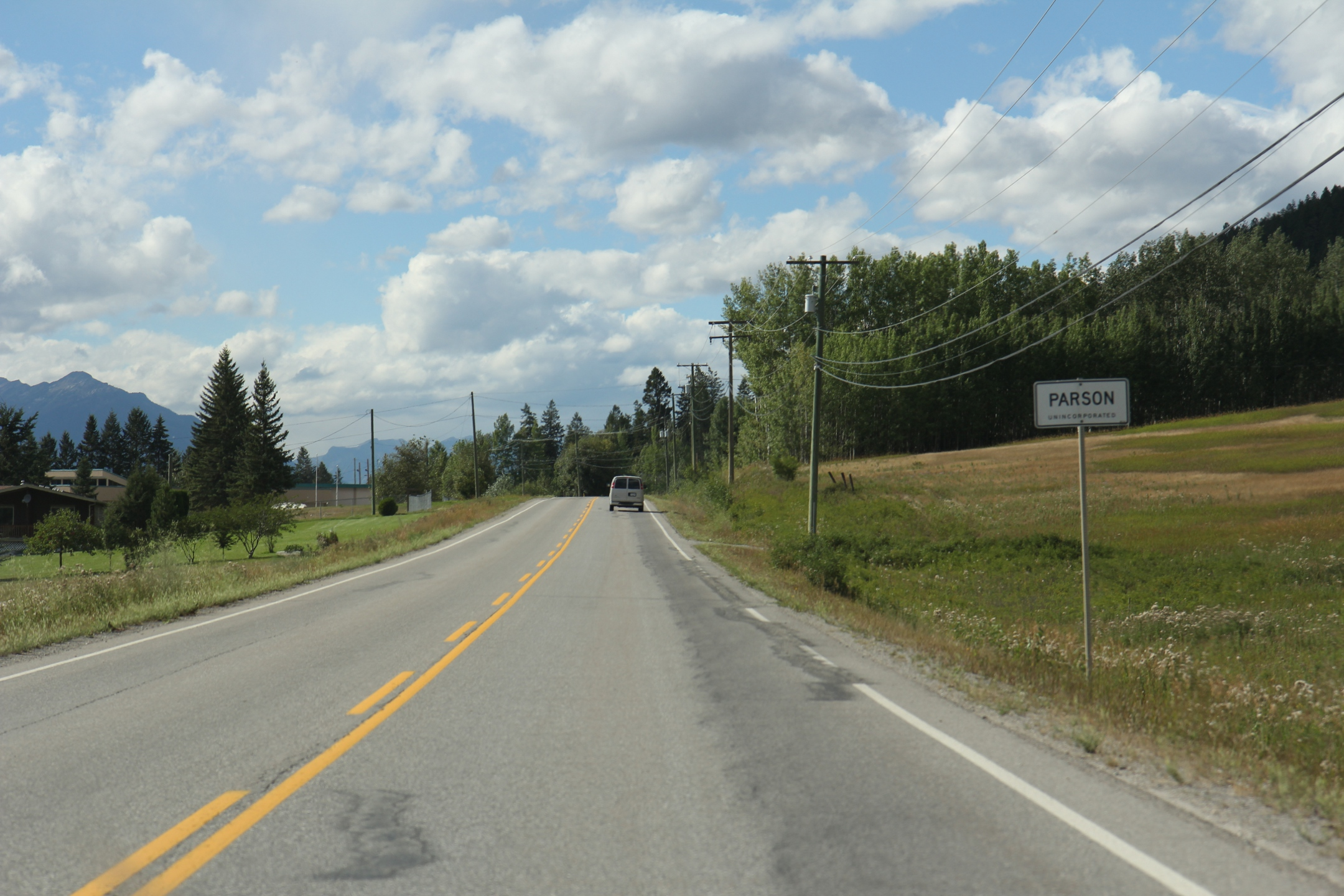
Entering Parson, British Columbia on BC-95.

The 329-kilometre-long (204 mi) Highway 95 begins at the international border in a small community called Kingsgate. It connects to U.S. Route 95 at the Eastport-Kingsgate Border Crossing. Heading north from there, it follows the Moyie River northeast for 11 km (7 mi) to the town of Yahk, where it merges onto the Crowsnest Highway (Highway 3). Highway 95 follows the Crowsnest Highway northeast for 72 km (45 mi) to the city of Cranbrook, where Highway 95A, designated in 1968 and following the original alignment of Highway 95 for 54 km (34 mi) through Kimberley and Ta Ta Creek, begins. From Cranbrook, it is another 7 km (4 mi) east to the Fort Steele junction, where Highway 3 hands Highway 95 off to Highway 93.

From the Fort Steele junction, Highway 95 follows Highway 93 north for 31 km (19 mi) through the community of Wasa, to where Highway 95A's east junction is located. From the Highway 95A junction, Highway 93/95 follows the Kootenay River upstream for 45 km (28 mi), through Skookumchuck to the town of Canal Flats, at the southern end of Columbia Lake. North of Canal Flats, Highway 93/95 travels for 58 km (36 mi) along the Columbia River, through the communities of Fairmont Hot Springs, Windermere and Invermere to the town of Radium Hot Springs, where Highway 93 diverges east. Highway 95 continues to follow the Columbia River north for 105 km (65 mi), through the locations of Edgewater, Brisco, Spillimacheen and Parson, to where it terminates at its junction with the Trans-Canada Highway (Highway 1) at Golden.

== History ==
Prior to 1941, British Columbia used lettered routes as opposed to numbers, and the Kootenay–Columbia Highway between Cranbrook and Golden was designated as part of Route U, which continued south to U.S. Route 93 at Roosville along present-day Highway 93. In 1941, British Columbia introduced numbered highways, with Highway 95 begin designated on 11 km (7 mi) Yahk–Kingsgate Highway, the northern extension of U.S. Route 95, while the Kootenay–Columbia Highway between Cranbrook and Golden was designated as Highway 4. In 1953, the Highway 4 was moved to its present location on Vancouver Island, with the Kootenay–Columbia Highway being renumbered to Highway 95. In 1968, A shorter alignment opened bypassing the Kimberley route via Ft Steele and Wasa. Immediately after opening the bypass was numbered Highway 93 with the Highway through Kimberley continuing to be numbered 95 for a few years until the completion of the "freeway style" interchange at Eager Hill when the bypass became 93/95 with the Kimberly alignment becoming Highway 95A in order to discourage through traffic from unnecessarily passing through Kimberley.

== Major intersections ==
From south to north:

Regional District	Location	km	mi	Destinations	Notes
Central Kootenay	Kingsgate	0.00	0.00	US 95 south – Bonners Ferry, Sandpoint, Coeur d'Alene	Continues into Idaho
Central Kootenay	Kingsgate	0.00	0.00	Canada–United States border at Eastport-Kingsgate Border Crossing	
Central Kootenay	Yahk	11.30	7.02	Highway 3 west (Crowsnest Highway) – Creston, Castlegar	South end of Highway 3 concurrency
East Kootenay	Cranbrook	77.24– 83.62	47.99– 51.96	Passes through Cranbrook	
East Kootenay	Cranbrook	83.62	51.96	Highway 95A north – Kimberley	Cranbrook Interchange
East Kootenay		89.05	55.33	Highway 3 east / Highway 93 south (Crowsnest Highway) – Fernie, Lethbridge	Fort Steele Interchange; north end of Highway 3 concurrency; south end of Highway 93 concurrency
East Kootenay	Fort Steele	96.05	59.68	Fort Steele Bridge across the Kootenay River	
East Kootenay	Fort Steele	97.19	60.39	Wardner–Fort Steele Road (Highway 903:1455 south) – Wardner	
East Kootenay	Wasa	120.71	75.01	Wasa Bridge across the Kootenay River	
East Kootenay	Wasa	120.84	75.09	Highway 95A south – Kimberley	
East Kootenay		133.28	82.82	Springbrook Bridge across the Kootenay River	
East Kootenay	Canal Flats	161.80	100.54	Canal Flats Bridge across the Kootenay River	
East Kootenay		183.93	114.29	Westside Road (Highway 903:2143 north)	
East Kootenay		185.79	115.44	Fairmont Bridge across the Columbia River	
East Kootenay	Fairmont Hot Springs	187.21	116.33	Riverview Road / Fairmont Resort Road	
East Kootenay	Shuswap Indian Band	210.29	130.67	Athalmer Road – Invermere, Panorama	
East Kootenay	Radium Hot Springs	223.45	138.85	Highway 93 north (Banff–Windermere Highway) / Forsters Landing Road – Kootenay National Park, Banff	North end of Highway 93 concurrency
Columbia-Shuswap	Golden	328.88	204.36	Highway 1 (TCH) – Kamloops, Revelstoke, Banff	
1.000 mi = 1.609 km; 1.000 km = 0.621 mi: Concurrency terminus

== See also ==
- List of British Columbia provincial highways
