= Skookumchuck, British Columbia =

Skookumchuck
- Location of Skookumchuck in British Columbia
- Coordinates: 49°54′59″N 115°44′03″W
- Country: Canada
- Province: British Columbia
- Region: East Kootenay
- Regional district: East Kootenay
- Area codes: 250, 778, 236, & 672
- Highways: Highway 95

Skookumchuck is in the East Kootenay region of southeastern British Columbia. This locality straddles both shores of the Kootenay River north of the mouth of the Lussier River. The crossing, on the merged section of highways 93 and 95, is by road about 54 kilometres (34 mi) north of Cranbrook and 193 kilometres (120 mi) southeast of Golden.

== Name origin ==
The name derives from Skookumchuck Creek, which an 1880s account describes as "stream of the rapid torrent" in Chinook Jargon. Gold prospectors built cabins on the creek, which is about 2 kilometres (1.2 mi) west of the present Skookumchuck bridge across the Kootenay River. Prior to erecting this link in the 1920s, the community on the east end was called Springbrook and the general area on the west side was called Skookumchuck. Subsequently, the merged communities adopted the more dominant Skookumchuck identity.

== Transportation ==
Since the 1890s, the basic elements have been similar to Wasa road and river and Wasa rail.

== Community ==
Although mining and logging had attracted settlers, the commencement of rail service in 1915 prompted further growth. John W. Blake was the inaugural postmaster 1915–1921. By 1918, he ran a general store near the station, but the few surrounding houses were soon deserted after the occupants moved farther north or west.

Around 1940, the Springbrook log cabins and a log grocery store were erected. A two-storey motel was added in the mid-1960s, and the log store burned to the ground in the mid-1970s. The rebuild was across the highway. In 1967, the telephone exchange opened.

In 1968, the establishment of the Skookumchuck Pulp Mill near the creek brought new subdivisions at Skookumchuck and new residents to the general area. Mill upgrades totalled $17 million in 1975, $22 million in 1985, and $279 million in 1993. A $50 million woodwaste cogeneration plant opened in 2001. In 2013, Paper Excellence Canada Holdings bought the mill from Tembecs for $89 million. In 2021, the mill was fined over $100,000 for exceeding permitted limits in treated wastewater discharges and air emissions.

The community infrastructure includes a convenience store/gas bar, and a motel/RV park/campground.

== Education ==
Historically, Skookumchuck covered a general area radiating about 3 kilometres (2 mi) from the train station. Larchwood school was regarded as being in Skookumchuck. However, the school's specific positioning was about 1.2 kilometres (0.7 mi) east of Larchwood Lake. In 1921, classes began for mill workers' children. Over the years, a series of schoolhouses and residences housed the students. By 1938, the school was farther south near the Skookumchuck train station. Enrolments included children from Torrent. The final school year was 1943/44.

In 1906, Sam Cadieux settled on Sheep Creek (Lussier River) about 3 kilometres (2 mi) north of Premier Lake (9 kilometres (6 mi) northeast of present Skookumchuck). The location was a stage stopping place. The school, which existed 1932–1952, was immediately northwest of Premier Lake. In 1949, a new building was erected. During this era, a school bus ran from Springbrook. In 1952, the new portable building of Springbrook Elementary, replaced the log-cabin school at remote Sheep Creek. Springbrook closed in 1957.
