= St. Mary's Bridge =

St. Mary's Bridge may refer to:

- McPhee Bridge over the St. Mary's River in Cranbrook, British Columbia
- Hi Carpenter Memorial Bridge over the Ohio River connecting Newport, Ohio and St. Marys, West Virginia
