= Edgewater, British Columbia =

Edgewater
- Location of Edgewater in British Columbia
- Coordinates: 50°41′59″N 116°8′8″W
- Country: Canada
- Province: British Columbia
- Region: Columbia Valley/East Kootenay
- Regional district: East Kootenay
- Time zone: UTC-7 (MST)
  - Summer (DST): UTC-6 (MDT)
- Postal code: V0A 1E0
- Area codes: 250, 778, 236, & 672
- Highways: Highway 95

Edgewater is an unincorporated hamlet located in the East Kootenay region of southeastern British Columbia with a population of 720 in 2021 and a population density of 70.4 people per square kilometre. It is along Highway 95 93 km (58 mi) south of Golden and on the perimeter of Kootenay National Park. It was originally founded as a farming community in 1912. Many of its residents were from England, and returned there after the war, causing the community to suffer a decline in population. Edgewater has since recovered, and the area's economy includes forestry, agriculture, and tourism.

Edgewater has couple of major attractions that draw travellers. The area around the community is farmland used for Christmas trees. During the summer, the Saturday Farmer's Market is where tourists can purchase arts and crafts, fresh produce and dairy products. Edgewater is also home to the Steamboat Mountain Music Festival in July.

The community gets its name from being at the edge of the waters of the Columbia River.
