= List of francophone communities in British Columbia =

This is a list of francophone communities in British Columbia. Municipalities with a high percentage of French-speakers in the Canadian province of British Columbia are listed.

The provincial average of British Columbians whose mother tongue is French is 1.2%, with a total of 57,420 people in British Columbia who identify French as their mother tongue in 2021. While several communities in these have sizeable French minorities, no municipalities have francophone majorities.

The majority of Franco-Columbians reside in communities within the southwest coast of British Columbia (including the Lower Mainland). The rest of Franco-Columbians resided in Vancouver Island and the central coast of British Columbia or in the Okanagan-Thompson region.

Municipality	Type	County, district, or regional municipality	Total population	Percentage of population whose mother tongue is French
Colwood	City	Capital	18,961	2%
Comox	Town	Comox Valley	14,028	3%
Courtenay	City	Comox Valley	28,420	2%
Cumberland	Village	Comox Valley	4,447	2%
Esquimalt	District municipality	Capital	17,533	3%
Fernie	City	East Kootenay	6,320	3%
Golden	Town	Columbia Shuswap	3,986	4%
Invermere	District municipality	East Kootenay	3,917	3%
Kaslo	Village	Central Kootenay	1,049	3%
Keremeos	Village	Okanagan-Similkameen	1,608	2%
Kitimat	District municipality	Kitimat-Stikine	8,236	2%
Lions Bay	Village	Greater Vancouver	1,390	2%
Mackenzie	District municipality	Fraser-Fort George	3,281	2%
Nelson	City	Central Kootenay	11,106	3%
Osoyoos	Town	Okanagan-Similkameen	5,556	3%
Pemberton	Village	Squamish-Lillooet	3,407	5%
Powell River	City	qathet	13,943	2%
Radium Hot Springs	Village	East Kootenay	1,339	3%
Revelstoke	City	Columbia Shuswap	8,275	5%
Rossland	City	Kootenay Boundary	4,140	4%
Squamish	District municipality	Squamish-Lillooet	23,819	3%
Tofino	District municipality	Alberni-Clayoquot	2,516	4%
Ucluelet	District municipality	Alberni-Clayoquot	2,066	3%
Whistler	Resort municipality	Squamish-Lillooet	13,982	4%

A number of small municipalities also have high francophone populations. Small francophone-minority municipalities include: Becher Bay (2%), Canal Flats (8%), Cayoosh Creek (8%), Chopaka (6%), Daajing Giids (2%), Esowista (6%), Greenwood (2%), Hazelton (2%), Lytton (2%), Matsqui (2%), Port Alice (2%), Priest's Valley (4%), Slocan (5%), Stewart (3%), Switsemalph (2%), T'Sou-ke (2%) and Tahsis (6%).

== See also ==
- Geographical distribution of French speakers
- List of municipalities in British Columbia
- Conseil scolaire francophone de la Colombie-Britannique
