= Windermere, British Columbia =

Windermere
- Community
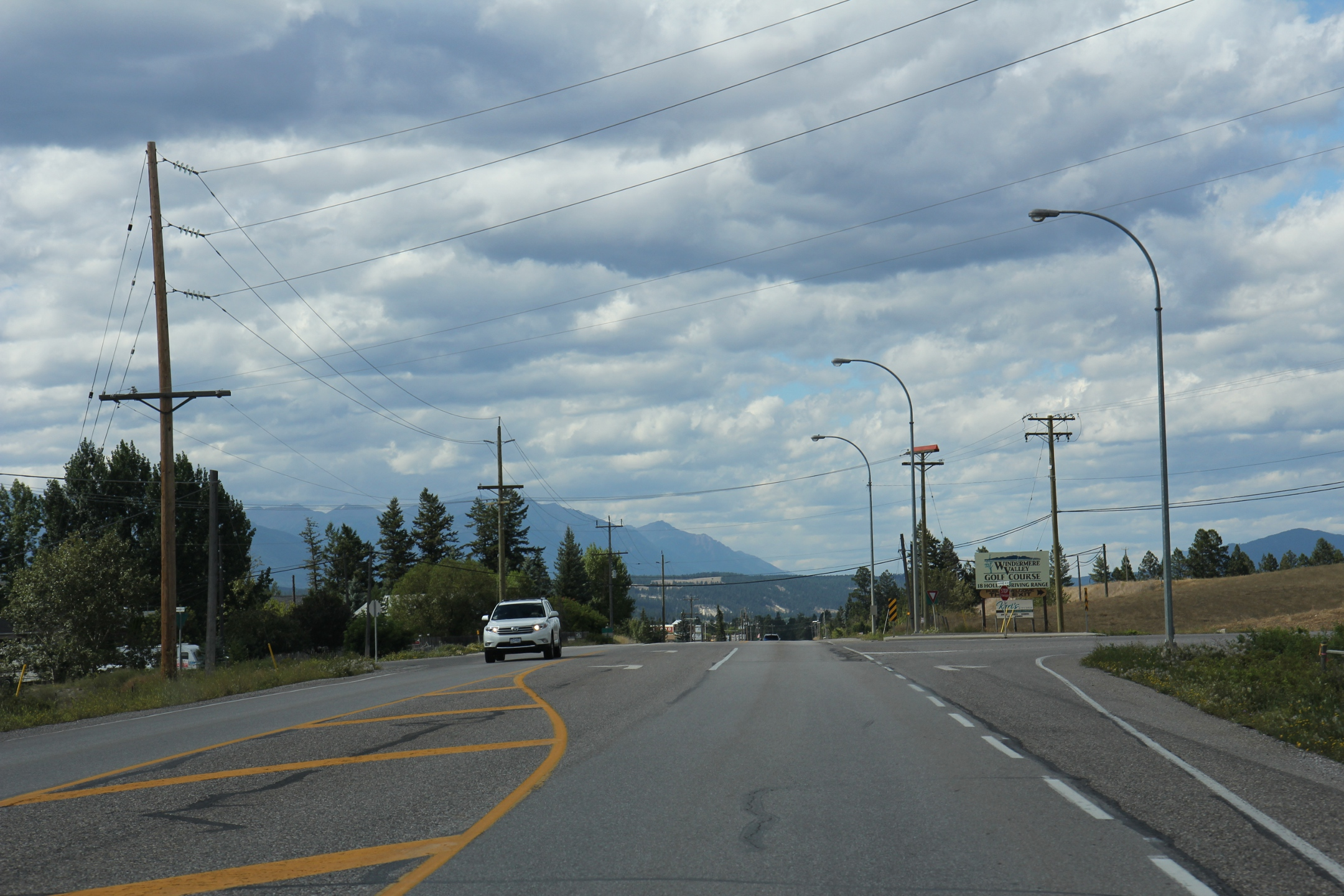
- Looking northwest on BC 93 / BC 95 at Windermere

- Location of Windermere in British Columbia
- Coordinates: 50°27′49″N 115°59′20″W
- Country: Canada
- Province: British Columbia
- Regional district: East Kootenay
- Founded: 1924
- Dissolved: 1983

Government
  - Type: Unincorporated
  - Governing body: Regional District of East Kootenay Council

Area
  - Land: 10.45 km^{2} (4.03 sq mi)

Population (2021)
  - Total: 1,511
  - Density: 144.7/km^{2} (375/sq mi)
- Time zone: UTC-7 (MST)
  - Summer (DST): UTC-6 (MDT)
- Highways: Highway 93 / Highway 95
- Waterways: Windermere Lake, Columbia River

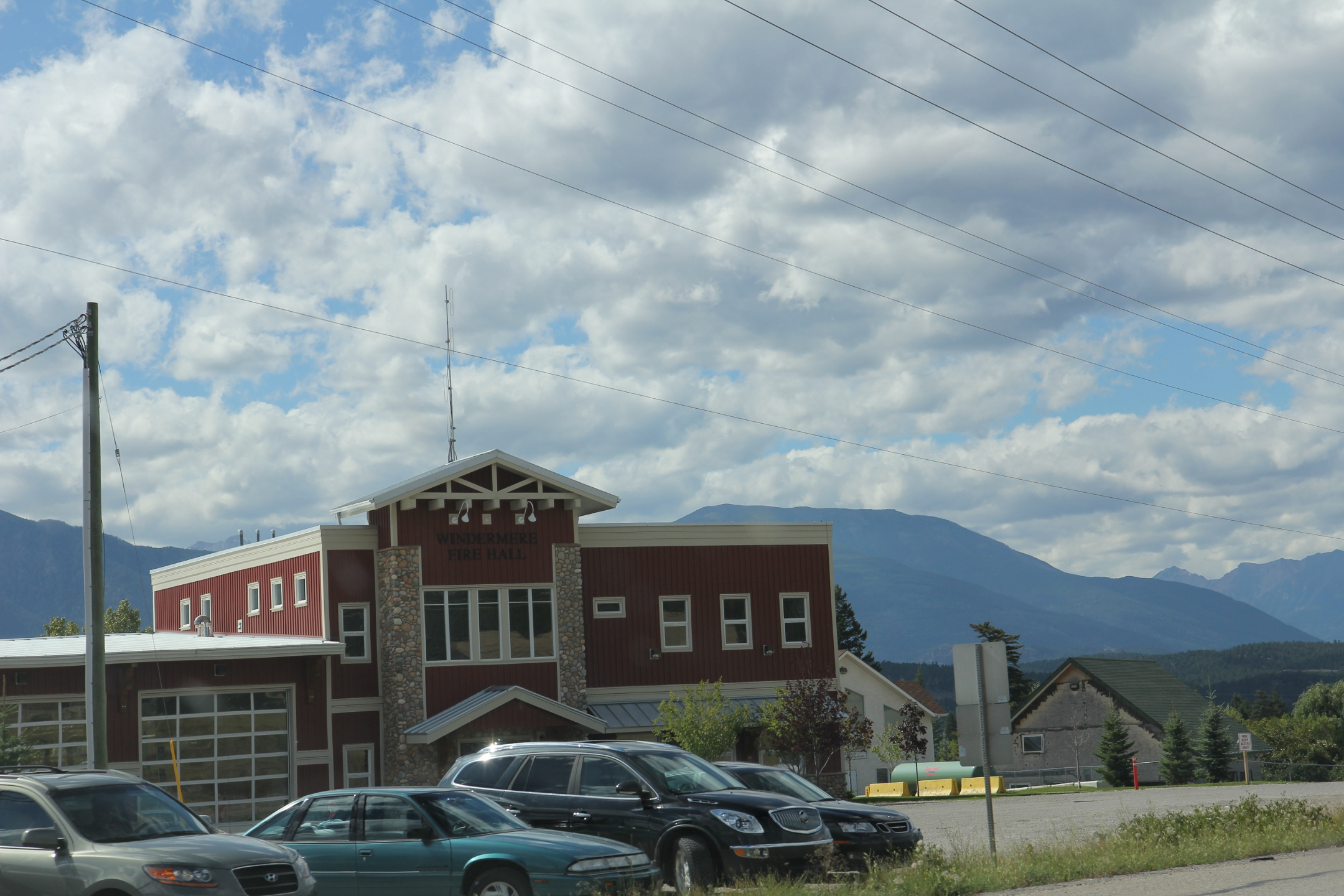
Windermere Fire Hall

Windermere is a community and designated place located south of Invermere on Windermere Lake in the Regional District of East Kootenay.

== Demographics ==
- Population (2021): 1,511
- Population (2016): 1,092
- Population (2011): 1,081
- Population (2006): 1,259
- Population (2001): 1,060
