= Wild Horse River =

River in East Kootenay, British Columbia, Canada

Coordinates: 49°36′02″N 115°37′03″W

Wild Horse River is a tributary of the Kootenay River in the East Kootenay region of southeastern British Columbia. The river flows southwest from the Canadian Rockies to the mouth, which lies immediately south of Fort Steele.

== Name origin ==
On his 1814 map, David Thompson called the stream Luissier. In late 1863, a group led by Joe Findlay were gold panning at the river mouth. Observing either a black wild stallion or a cayuse on the hillside, which possibly showed interest in one of their mares, they called the stream Stud Horse Creek. A year or two later, the official rename was Wild Horse Creek. Around 1950, Wild Horse River became the common name.

== Mining ==
Mike Reynolds in the 1860s found a 1,021-gram (36 oz) gold nugget along the Wildhorse Creek. This was the largest one recovered from the river. Placer mining for gold was found to be profitable, and a gold rush began. Worked by both Euro-Canadian and Chinese-Canadian miners, the river has been a significant BC gold producing stream. Close to $7,000,000 in gold was found during the goldrush. The river experienced major mining activity from 1863 to 1868 and from 1885 to 1900. Mining methods have included hydraulics, tunnels, and shafts.

In 1864, an important mining camp was established along the waterway. It became the town of Fisherville, on the site now known as Wildhorse Creek Historic Site.

== Springs ==
Accessible by a hiking trail, the major sources at the upper level are warm and cold springs. On Crown land, the water is clear and odourless. Water temperatures range from 21 to 33 °C (70 to 91 °F), being warmer on colder days and vice versa. Several springs in the area have dried up.

== See also ==
- List of rivers of British Columbia
- British Columbia Gold Rushes
