= Findlay Creek (British Columbia) =

Coordinates: 50°05′34″N 115°47′10″W

Findlay Creek is a creek in the East Kootenay region of British Columbia. This creek flows into the Kootenay River from the western side. Findlay Creek is located to the south of Canal Flats. The creek was discovered in 1863 by a native named Findlay. This creek has been mined by Europeans and Chinese miners.
