= St. Mary River (British Columbia) =

Location
- Country: Canada
- Province: British Columbia
- District: Kootenay Land District

Physical characteristics
- Source: Purcell Wilderness Conservancy
  - location: Purcell Mountains
  - coordinates: 49°55′N 116°34′W
- Mouth: Kootenay River
  - location: Fort Steele
  - coordinates: 49°37′N 115°39′W

The St. Mary River (sometimes represented as the St. Mary's River) is a river in the East Kootenay region of British Columbia. It rises in the Purcell Mountains and flows in a generally southeasterly direction to its confluence with the Kootenay River at Fort Steele, British Columbia.

== See also ==
- List of rivers of British Columbia
