= Fisherville, British Columbia =

Fisherville
- Location of Fisherville in British Columbia
- Coordinates: 49°39′18″N 115°35′39″W
- Country: Canada
- Province: British Columbia
- Region: East Kootenay
- Regional district: East Kootenay

Fisherville is a ghost town on the northwest shore of the Wild Horse River in the East Kootenay region of southeastern British Columbia. The locality, off the Fort Steele-Wildhorse Road, is by road about 7 kilometres (4 mi) northeast of Fort Steele.

== Name origin ==
In late 1863, a group led by Joe Findlay collected either large gold flakes or abundant nuggets when panning at the mouth of Wild Horse Creek. Various versions exist regarding the members of two parties arriving the following spring, but Bob Dore and Jack Fisher are two of the key players staking claims. The tent community was called Fisherville and the towering peak later became Mount Fisher.

== Mining boom ==
A nearby contributory creek, which was the water source for a brewery operation, became Brewery Creek. The product was consumed in the numerous saloons that sprang up. The Dore, Cuddy and Fisher, near the mouth of Brewery Creek, would prove to be the richest claims. By May 1864, 150 prospectors were working the main waterway. The two general stores struggled to keep up with demand and charged high prices. Most supplies came from the US, linked via the only practicable trails. However, that year, a glut made beef the cheapest food.

During an argument in late July, Tommy Walker shot off the thumb of William "Yeast Powder Bill” Burmeister, who returned fire killing Walker. When Gold Commissioner John C. Haynes and Constable Harry Anderson arrived a few days later, a formal jury was convened. The evidence insufficient for a conviction, the defendant was expelled from the district. Law enforcement erected a cabin, then jail, collected government tariffs, and maintained the peace. Dave Griffiths, prospector and storekeeper, who settled a mile away, stayed for 50 years. Some of the apple trees he planted continue to produce fruit. The fireplace and chimney base at his residence remain standing.

By late summer, the population was an estimated 700. Most departed before the winter but some stayed, including William Young, the constable. When heavy snow prevented the delivery of supplies, a chronic food shortage developed. The 8-kilometre (5 mi) Victoria ditch was excavated.

In 1865, the snow melt flooded the creek and half the summer was wasted. Only a third of the 1,500 miners were gainfully employed. Most left on news of better prospects elsewhere. Those who stayed used water supplied by the ditch to flush the Fisherville bench, which yielded exceptional recoveries. Dore installed the first hydraulic plant, his claim producing $521,700 over the first three years. As the ground was progressively worked, cabins in the way were moved, demolished or torched. That year, Peter O'Reilly was appointed gold commissioner at Fisherville. A camp called Wild Horse was created closer to the new activity. Halfway to Galbraith's Ferry was Toneyville, known for its brothels.

== Mining demise ==
In 1865, a decline was evident. Falling demand meant supplies were overstocked. However, the Wild Horse valley remained capable of supporting 600 miners, creating an opportunity for the Chinese. About 100 Caucasians and 20 Chinese stayed the winter. A post office, initially called Kootenai, existed 1866–1899 near the Wild Horse camp. The adjacent land was good for agriculture. In 1866, enough wheat was grown to satisfy the local flour demand.

In June 1866, John Boles Gaggin arrived as assistant to O'Reilly, but was made redundant that November. After a lengthy illness, he died the following May and was buried in the cemetery. By fall 1866, Caucasian numbers had dropped, but the Chinese had risen to 300. Caucasians continued to dwindle each season and Fisherville became known as Chinatown. A Chinese presence remained over the following years.

In spring 1867, a horse thief murdered Constable Jack Lawson, but some accounts ascribe the year as 1864.

The Hudson's Bay Company, wanting to exit the local market, sold the Wild Horse store to John Galbraith of Galbraith's Ferry in 1870, making Galbraith Bros the most significant traders in the district, having stores at Perry Creek, Joseph's Prairie (later called Cranbrook), Galbraith's Ferry, and Wild Horse.

== Mining revival and First Nations unrest ==
After a lull, claims were being worked with a new vigour from 1884, with the population steadily increasing each year.

In 1887, Chief Isadore and 25 warriors sprang a murder suspect from the jail, but the prisoner was returned to custody and found not guilty.

In 1888, five quartz claims containing grained galena were staked. In 1889, Skookum Joe discovered a significant gold quartz ledge, which he revealed to George Cowan.

In the 1890s, the adoption of large pump machinery created a revival in placer mining, which attracted thousands, but again later became primarily Chinese. In 1901, nine individuals returned to China each with $15,000. Claims were then worked intermittently for almost two decades before a revival in hydraulic mining 1919–1925.

== Historic site ==
By 1929, the earlier wooden grave markers were indecipherable and the log houses reduced to remnants.

Wild Horse, Fisherville, and Toneyville are identifiable as separate sites.

The mining area was designated a National Historic Site of Canada in 1996.

Later blank crosses are the only markers in the main cemetery. Tommy Walker's grave, outside the cemetery, has a headstone. The Chinese cemetery is separate.

In 2021, signs were posted to discourage recreational panning, which was damaging the historic site.

== See also ==
- List of ghost towns in British Columbia
- British Columbia Gold Rushes
