= Wardner, British Columbia =

Wardner
- Location of Wardner in British Columbia
- Coordinates: 49°25′4.21″N 115°25′18.76″W
- Country: Canada
- Province: British Columbia
- Regional District: East Kootenay
- Established: 1897
- Elevation: 829 m (2,720 ft)
- Demonym: Wardnerite
- Time zone: UTC-7 (Mountain Standard (MST))
  - Summer (DST): UTC-6 (Mountain Daylight (MDT))
- Postal codes: V0B 2J0
- Area codes: 250, 778

Wardner is an unincorporated community in the East Kootenay region of southeastern British Columbia. The locality is located 27 km (17 mi) east of Cranbrook and 26 km (16 mi) west of Fernie. The unincorporated settlement runs parallel to the Kootenay River beside Highway 3/93.

== History ==
Wardner began development in 1897 after Jim Wardner sold 144 acres to Simon and William Guggenheim. The two brothers built a smelter on the property and divided the remaining land into smaller sized lots, thus starting a boom town. In 1901 Jay A. Humphreys built a planer and saw mill to process the local lumber harvested from the area. Steamboats were used to move materials and people to the other local towns up until 1909 when a road bridge was built across the Kootenay River.

Up until the early 1930s the town was thriving. It had two hotels, a couple general stores, an ice cream parlor, a barber shop, a drug store, a golf course, three schools, two churches, a cemetery, a post office, and a police station. In 1931 a fire erupted in the saw mill which ceased its operations temporarily. A depression then hit the town, with more random fires occurring. Many of the businesses were shut down and people were out of jobs; however, the mill began operating again and changed ownership multiple times until it was finally sold in 1962 for parts. With the construction of the Libby Dam, the Canadian Pacific Railway rerouted the tracks to go through Fort Steele instead of Wardner and the highway was moved upriver away from the town due to the water level of the reservoir.
