= Fairmont Bridge =

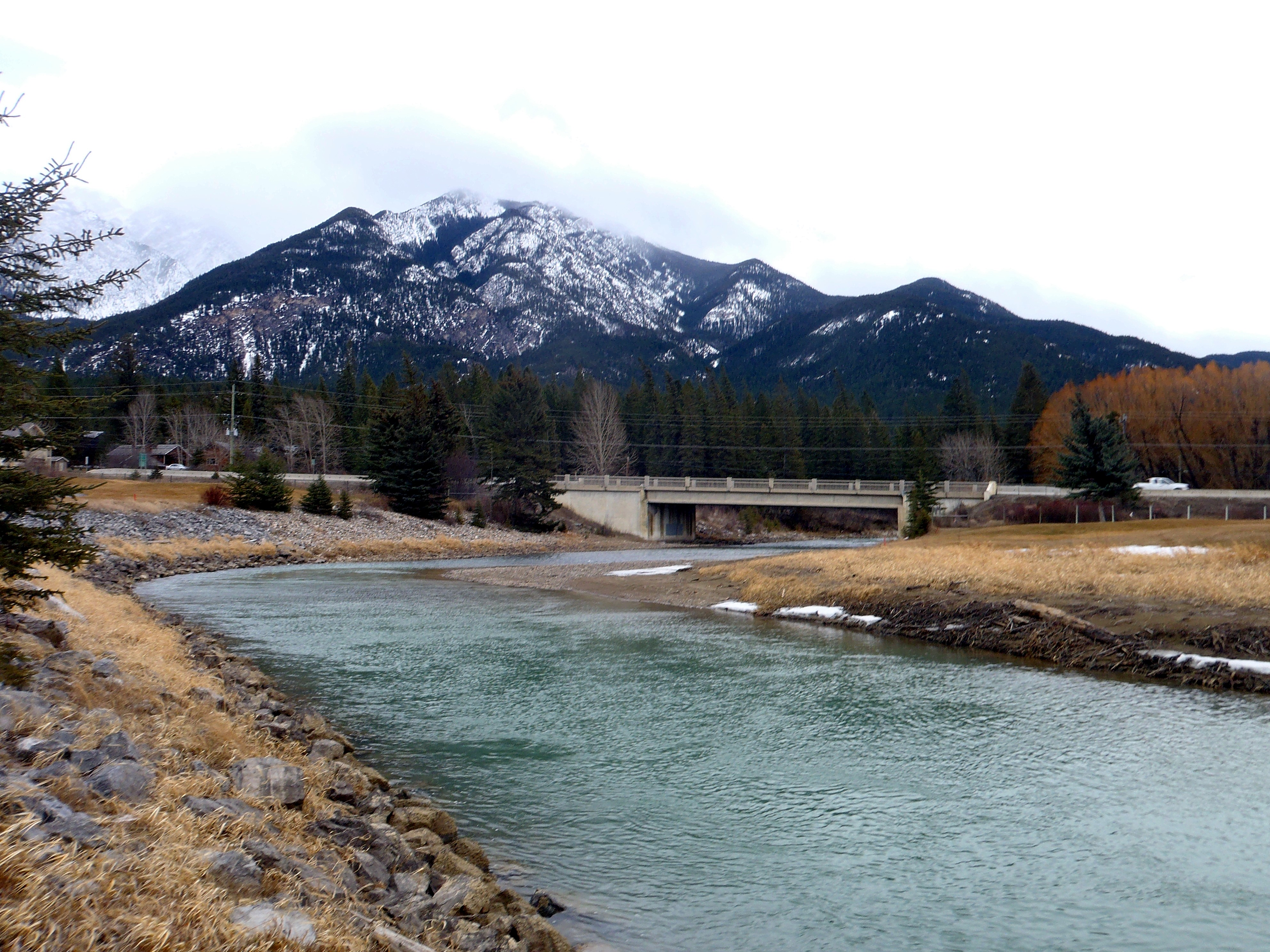
- Coordinates: 50°19′25″N 115°51′59″W
- Carries: Highway 93 / Highway 95
- Crosses: Columbia River

History
- Construction cost: CAD 100,000

The Fairmont Bridge is the first crossing of the Columbia River, at Fairmont Hot Springs, British Columbia. It carries British Columbia Highway 93/Highway 95 over a "creek-like segment" of the Columbia River between its source, Columbia Lake and Lake Windermere. The Fairmont Community Association also planned to route a trail built in 2017, the Fairmont Foot Path, over the bridge.
