= Invermere =

- District municipality
- District of Invermere
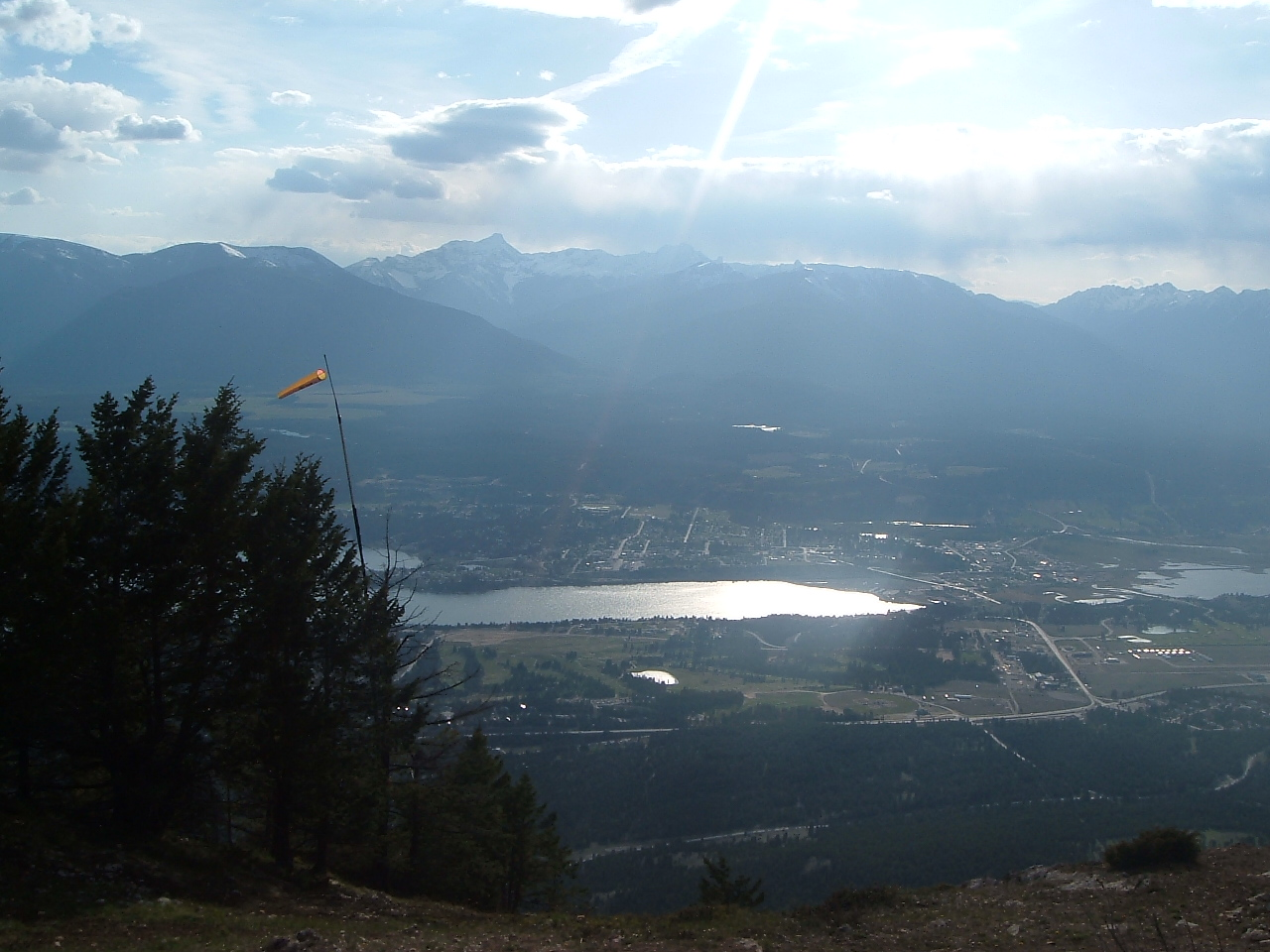
- Invermere, British Columbia, with Mount Nelson in the distance

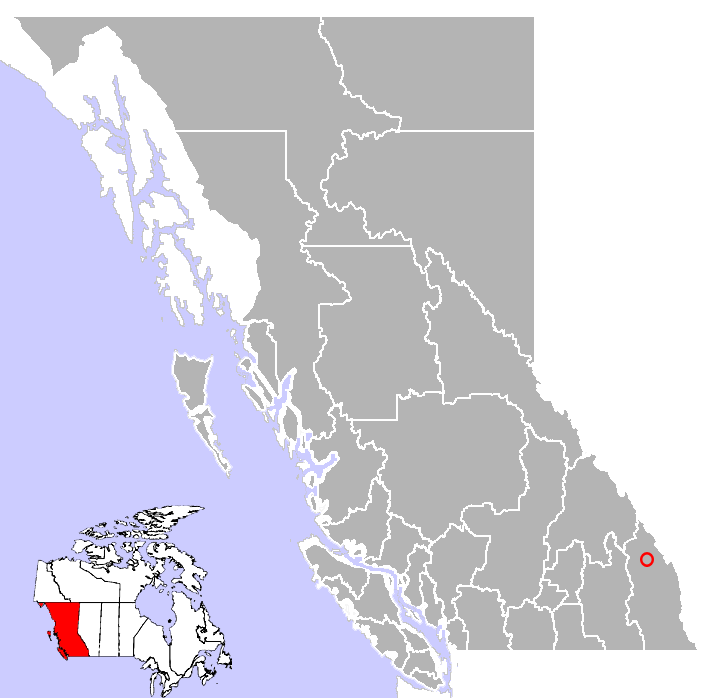
- Location of Invermere, British Columbia
- Coordinates: 50°30′30″N 116°01′49″W
- Country: Canada
- Province: British Columbia
- Region: East Kootenay
- Incorporated: 1951

Government
  - Governing body: Invermere Council
  - MP: Rob Morrison (Conservative)
  - MLA: Scott McInnis (BC Conservative)

Area
  - Land: 10.75 km^{2} (4.15 sq mi)
  - Urban: 3.44 km^{2} (1.33 sq mi)
- Elevation: 859 m (2,818 ft)

Population (2021)
  - District municipality: 3,917
  - Density: 364.4/km^{2} (944/sq mi)
  - Urban: 3,340
  - Urban density: 971.4/km^{2} (2,516/sq mi)
- Time zone: UTC-7 (Mountain Standard (MST))
  - Summer (DST): UTC-6 (Mountain Daylight (MDT))
- Postal code span: V0A 1K0, V0A 1K7
- Area code: 250 / 778 / 236
- Highways: Highway 93; Highway 95
- Waterways: Columbia River, Windermere Lake
- Website: invermere.net

Invermere is a community in eastern British Columbia, Canada, near the border of Alberta. It is the hub of the Columbia Valley between Golden to the north and Cranbrook to the south. Invermere sits on the northwest shore of Windermere Lake and is a popular summer destination for visitors and second home owners from Edmonton and Calgary.

== Geography ==
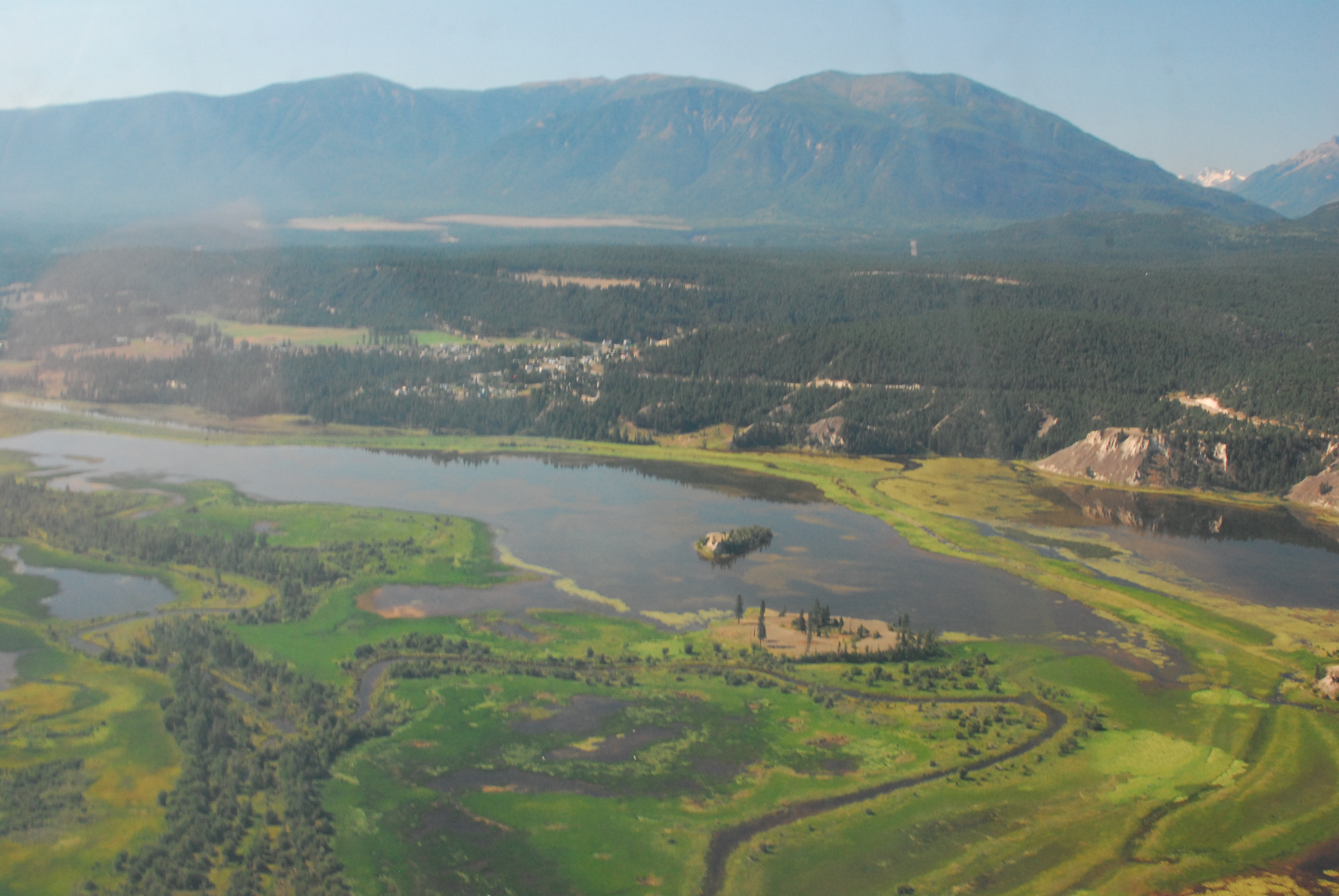
Columbia River Wetlands

Invermere is located 14 kilometres (8.7 mi) south of Radium, and 104 kilometres (65 mi) south of Golden and 102 kilometres (63 mi) from the Trans-Canada Highway. Invermere is also 37 kilometres (23 mi) north of Fairmont Hot Springs, 60 kilometres (37 mi) north of Canal Flats, 128 kilometres (80 mi) north of Fort Steele, 130 kilometres (81 mi) north of Kimberley, and 144 kilometres (89 mi) north of the hub of Cranbrook and the Crowsnest Highway. Invermere is situated within the Columbia River Wetlands, North America's largest intact wetland and a Ramsar-designated site. Located in the Rocky Mountain Trench, Invermere is 17.5 kilometres (10.9 mi) from Kootenay National Park, and is near the Purcell Wilderness Conservancy.

== Climate ==
Invermere's climate is characterized by warm summers and cool winters. The Rocky Mountains to the east shield Invermere from the Arctic air in winter, although extreme cold spells do occur on occasion. Spring arrives earlier than on the prairies to the east of the Rocky Mountains. Although warm, summers are variable, with weather alternating between hot, dry spells and cool, showery periods.

== Demographics ==
In the 2021 Census of Population conducted by Statistics Canada, Invermere had a population of 3,917 living in 1,660 of its 2,238 total private dwellings, a change of 15.5% from its 2016 population of 3,391. With a land area of 10.75 km^{2} (4.15 sq mi), it had a population density of 364.4/km^{2} (943.7/sq mi) in 2021.

=== Ethnicity ===
Panethnic groups in the District of Invermere (1996−2021)
Panethnic group	2021		2016		2011		2006		2001		1996	
Panethnic group	Pop.	%	Pop.	%	Pop.	%	Pop.	%	Pop.	%	Pop.	%
European (Note: Statistic includes all persons that did not make up part of a visible minority or an indigenous identity.)	3,370	88.8%	2,815	87.42%	2,380	88.81%	2,730	94.46%	2,690	95.22%	2,540	95.31%
Indigenous	245	6.46%	210	6.52%	150	5.6%	115	3.98%	120	4.25%	70	2.63%
Southeast Asian (Note: Statistic includes total responses of "Filipino" and "Southeast Asian" under visible minority section on census.)	115	3.03%	90	2.8%	0	0%	10	0.35%	10	0.35%	0	0%
South Asian	30	0.79%	25	0.78%	0	0%	0	0%	0	0%	0	0%
East Asian (Note: Statistic includes total responses of "Chinese", "Korean", and "Japanese" under visible minority section on census.)	10	0.26%	30	0.93%	80	2.99%	35	1.21%	0	0%	30	1.13%
African	10	0.26%	20	0.62%	0	0%	0	0%	10	0.35%	0	0%
Middle Eastern (Note: Statistic includes total responses of "West Asian" and "Arab" under visible minority section on census.)	0	0%	10	0.31%	0	0%	0	0%	0	0%	0	0%
Latin American	0	0%	0	0%	0	0%	0	0%	0	0%	10	0.38%
Other/multiracial (Note: Statistic includes total responses of "Visible minority, n.i.e." and "Multiple visible minorities" under visible minority section on census.)	0	0%	10	0.31%	0	0%	10	0.35%	0	0%	15	0.56%
Total responses	3,795	96.89%	3,220	94.96%	2,680	90.69%	2,890	96.27%	2,825	98.85%	2,665	99.18%
Total population	3,917	100%	3,391	100%	2,955	100%	3,002	100%	2,858	100%	2,687	100%
Note: Totals greater than 100% due to multiple origin responses.

=== Religion ===
According to the 2021 census, religious groups in Invermere included:

- Irreligion (2,380 persons or 62.7%)
- Christianity (1,340 persons or 35.3%)
- Buddhism (20 persons or 0.5%)
- Hinduism (20 persons or 0.5%)
- Other (35 persons or 0.9%)

== Arts and culture ==
The annual Invermere MusicFest takes place on the Pynelogs greenspace for one weekend every August. The two-day Festival attracts hundreds of people each day and delivers a high caliber of Canadian and international musical talent.

== Sports and recreation ==
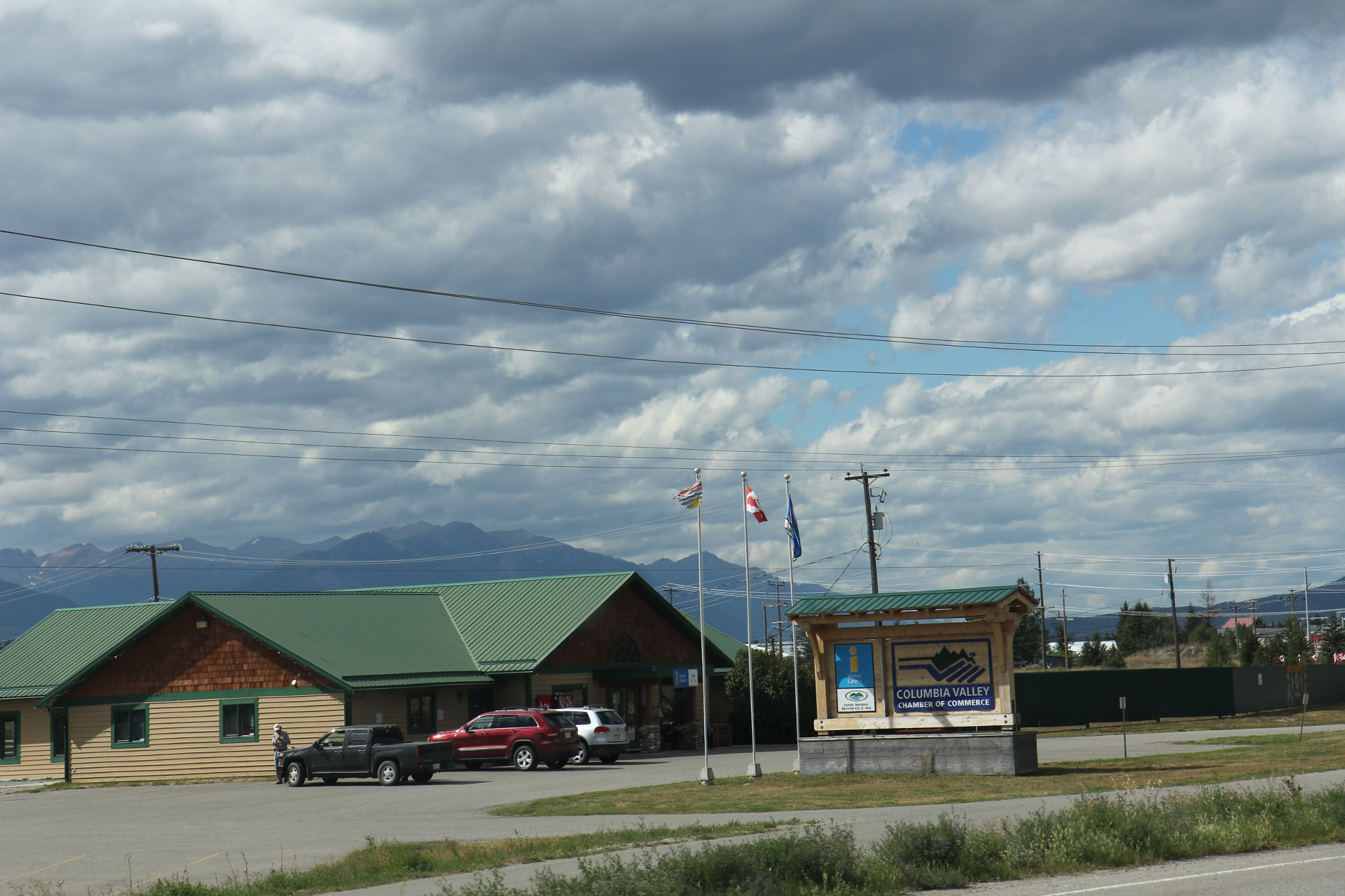
The Columbia Valley Chamber of Commerce in Invermere

Hockey

The Columbia Valley Rockies play in Invermere. Former New York Islanders and University of Denver goaltender Wade Dubielewicz was born in Invermere.

Club	League	Sport	Venue	Established	Championships
Columbia Valley Rockies	KIJHL	Ice hockey	Eddie Mountain Memorial Arena	1978	4

Skiing

- Panorama Mountain Village lies about 30 minutes west.
- Fairmont Hot Springs Resort ski area lies 25 minutes south.
- Kimberley Alpine Resort is about 1 hour south in Kimberley.
- Kicking Horse Mountain Resort is about 1.5 hours north of Invermere in Golden, British Columbia

Skating

The longest ice skating trail in the world can be found on the Lake Windermere Whiteway. The naturally frozen trail measures 29.98 kilometres (18.63 mi).

Golfing

Invermere is a major centre for golf.

- Copper Point Golf Club is a newer golf course about 2 kilometres (1.2 mi) east of Invermere along Highway 95/93.
- Eagle Ranch Golf Course is located 3 kilometres (1.9 mi) northeast of Invermere, also along Highway 93/95 and was rated 4.5/5.0 stars by Golf Digest.

Gliding and soaring

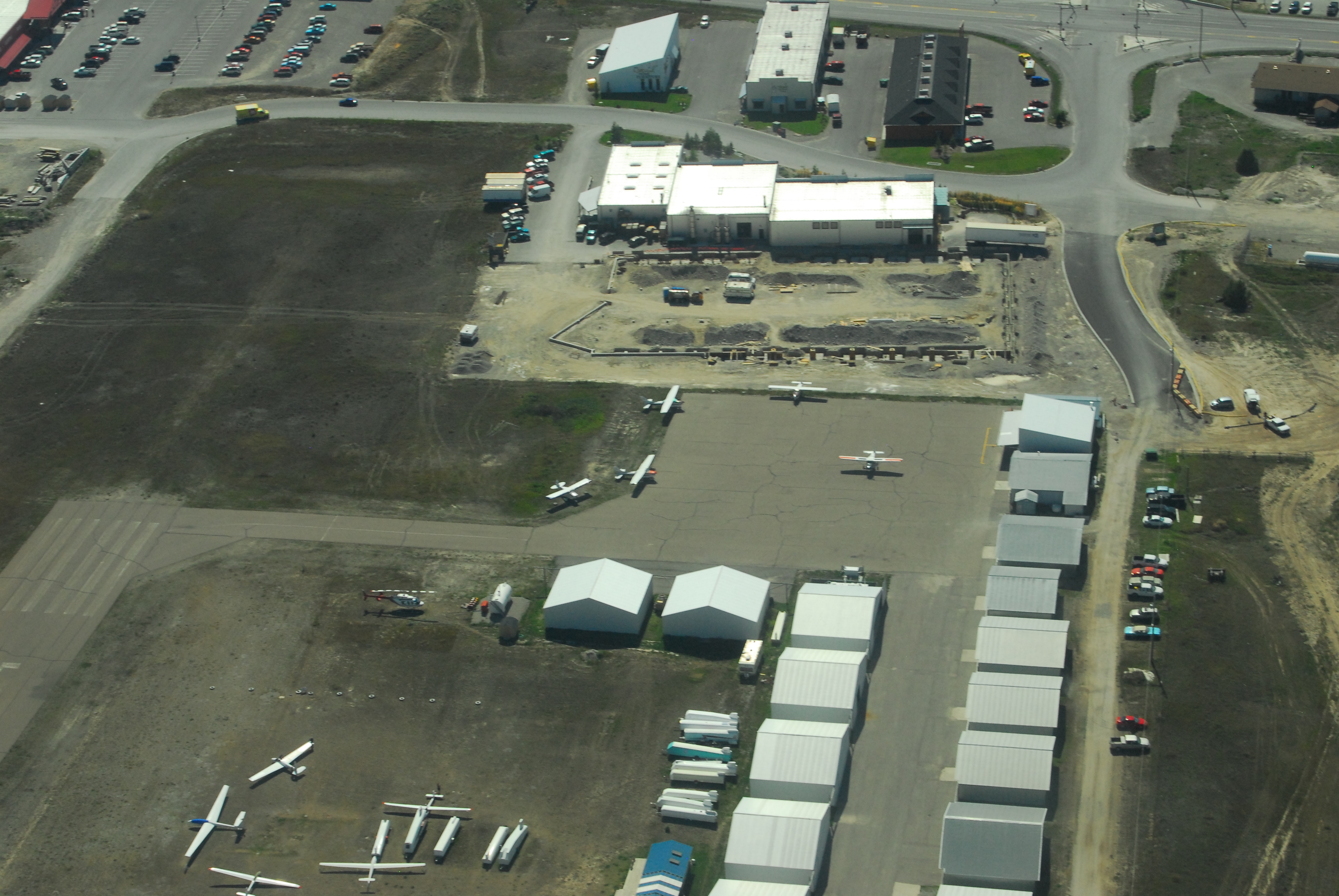
Invermere Airport

The Invermere Airport is home to the non-profit Canadian Rockies Soaring Club. The club is active during the summer months, when it welcomes dozens of student pilots and private owners. The Invermere Soaring Centre is a separate commercial operation which provides aerotowing services and glider rides to the general public.

- Canadian Rockies Soaring Club
- Invermere Soaring Centre

The local area is also a popular destination for other non-motorized forms of flying including hang-gliding and paragliding. There are designated launch sites at nearby Mount Swansea.

Curling

The Valley is host to the biggest outdoor bonspiel in Canada every January. The spiel is held on the frozen Windermere Lake. The curling club is also host to many leagues and bonspiels throughout the season.

Hot springs

Hot springs are numerous in the area, with the major developed ones being Fairmont and Radium Hot Springs; the latter is located inside Kootenay National Park.

Less developed 'wilderness' hot springs can be found in the southern Columbia Valley, in Whiteswan Lake Provincial Park. Lussier Hot Springs is located 74 kilometres (46 mi) south of Invermere and can be accessed from the Whiteswan Forestry Road. Lussier Hot Springs are accessible via a mountain logging road which is open all year round, depending on the weather and road conditions. These hot springs are free to access, however do not have the amenities like the developed hot springs and can sometimes have a sulphur odour smell.

Ram Creek Warm Springs, a less visited and cooler natural spring, can also be accessed along the same route.

== Media ==
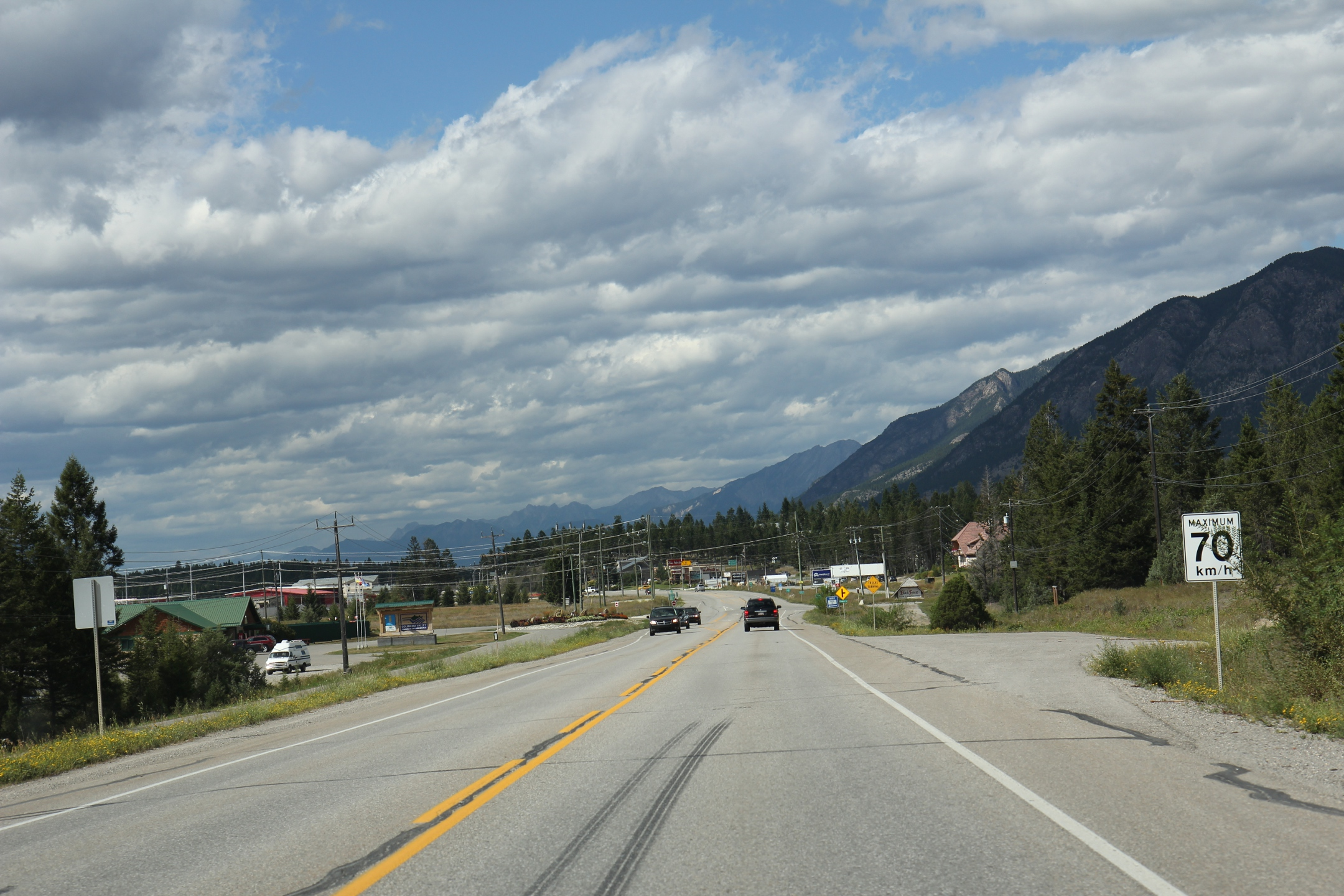
Looking north on BC93 / BC95 at Invermere

Invermere is home to one newspaper, the Columbia Valley Pioneer. On July 1, 2017, the "Pioneer" (founded in 2004) and the Invermere Valley Echo (founded in 1956) merged to one paper retaining the Columbia Valley Pioneer designation. The "Pioneer" serves the Columbia Valley region, from Spillimacheen in the north to Canal Flats in the south and is published once a week, every Thursday.

== Notable people ==
- Wade Dubielewicz – Ice hockey player and coach
- Cassidy Gray – Olympic alpine skier
- Christine Keshen – Curler
- Patrick Morrow – Photographer
- Benjamin Thomsen – Professional skier

== See also ==
- List of francophone communities in British Columbia
