= British Columbia Highway 93 =

Provincial highway in British Columbia, Canada

Highway 93
- Highway 93 highlighted in red.

Route information
- Maintained by the Ministry of Transportation and Infrastructure
- Length: 321 km (199 mi)
- Existed: 1958–present
- Component highways: (1) Elko–Roosville Highway (2) Kootenay–Columbia Highway (3) Banff–Windermere Parkway

Major junctions
- South end: US 93 at the U.S. border at Roosville
- Highway 3 in Elko; Highway 3 / Highway 95 near Fort Steele; Highway 95A near Wasa; Highway 95 at Radium Hot Springs
- North end: Highway 93 at Alberta border at Vermilion Pass

Location
- Country: Canada
- Province: British Columbia

Highway system
- British Columbia provincial highways
← Highway 91A	→ Highway 95

Highway 93 is a north–south route through the southeastern part of British Columbia, in the Regional District of East Kootenay and takes its number from U.S. Highway 93 that it connects with at the Canada–United States border. It follows the Crowsnest Highway (Highway 3) and Highway 95 through Radium Hot Springs and to where it crosses the Continental Divide into Alberta at Vermilion Pass, where it continues as Alberta Highway 93. The section between the Canada-U.S. border and the Crowsnest Highway is known as the Elko–Roosville Highway, the section between the Crowsnest Highway and Radium Hot Springs is known as the Kootenay–Columbia Highway, while the section east of Radium Hot Springs is known as the Banff–Windermere Parkway.

== Route description ==
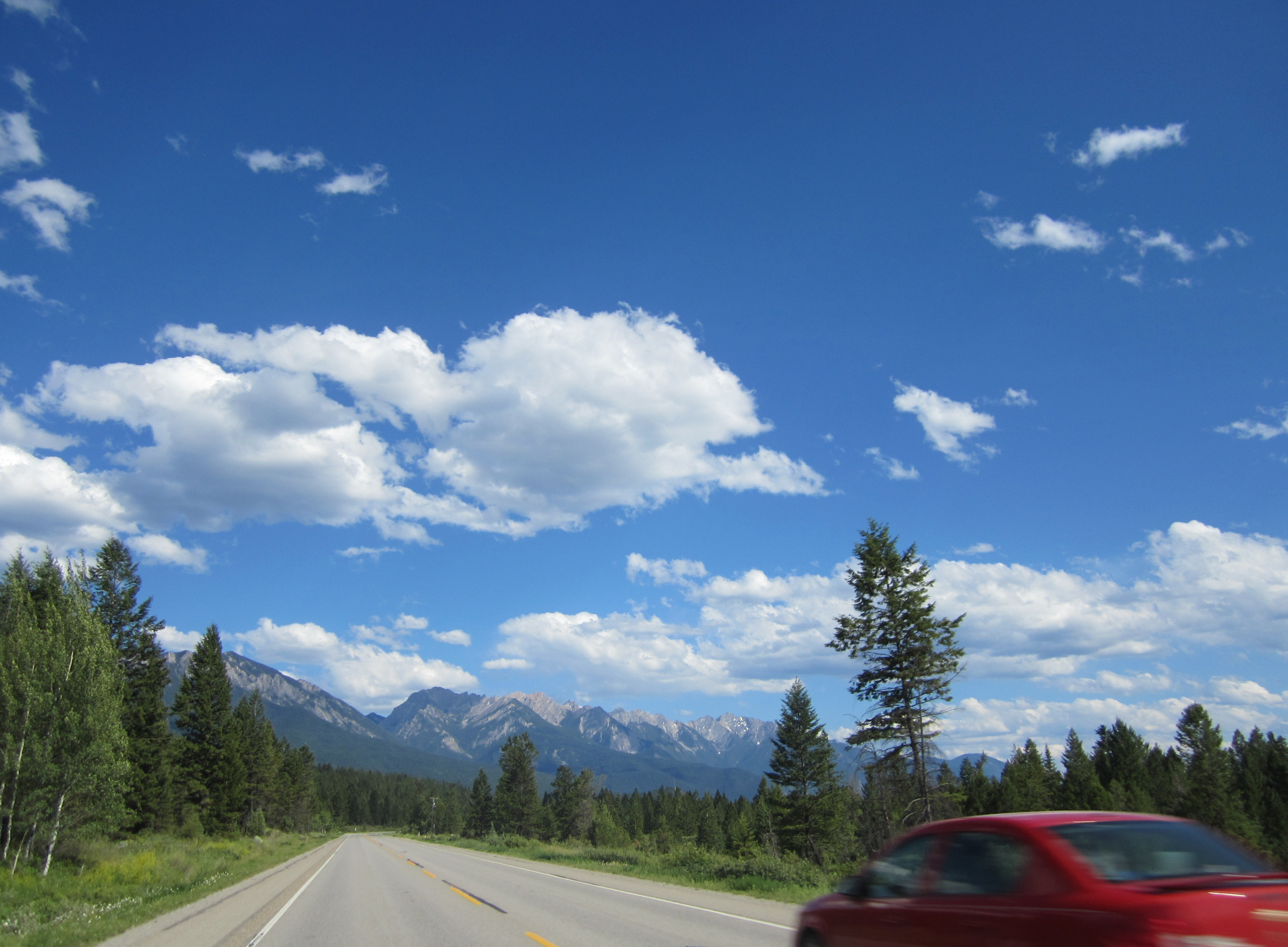
Highway 93

From the international border crossing at Roosville, the 321 km (199 mi) long Highway 93 parallels the eastern shore of Lake Koocanusa for 36 km (22 mi) to where it meets the Crowsnest Highway (Highway 3) at Elko. Highway 3 carries Highway 93 west for 53 km (33 mi) to where it is handed off to Highway 95 just south of Fort Steele. Highway 95 carries Highway 93 north for another 134 km (83 mi) along the Kootenay River and the Columbia River passing through Wasa, Canal Flats, Fairmont Hot Springs and Invermere to Radium Hot Springs, where Highway 95 diverges north towards Golden.

Highway 93 leaves the concurrence and proceeds east from Radium Hot Springs for about 1.3 km (0.8 mi) to the western gate of Kootenay National Park. Through the park, the highway travels northeast along the Kootenay and Vermilion rivers for 93 km (58 mi) to Vermilion Pass and the Alberta border, where it is continues as Alberta Highway 93. After crossing the border, the highway continues for another 11 km (7 mi) to meet the Trans-Canada Highway (Alberta Highway 1) near Castle Junction.

== History ==
The Highway first opened in 1953 from the international border to Elko, on Highway 3, but it did not follow its current route from the border until 1958. Before 1959, the Banff–Windermere Parkway, the segment of Highway 93 east of Radium Hot Springs, had a designation of Highway 1B, reflecting its connection to the Trans-Canada Highway within Alberta at Castle Junction. In 1959, Highway 93 was extended from Elko along Highway 3 and Highway 95 to Radium Hot Springs, while Highway 1B and the Icefields Parkway (known as Highway 1A) were renumbered to their present designation.

== Major intersections ==
From south to north:

Regional District	Location	km	mi	Destinations	Notes
East Kootenay	Roosville	0.00	0.00	US 93 south – Eureka, Kalispell	Continues into Montana
East Kootenay	Roosville	0.00	0.00	Canada–United States border at Roosville Border Crossing	
East Kootenay	Elko	36.95	22.96	Highway 3 east (Crowsnest Highway) – Fernie, Lethbridge	South end of Highway 3 concurrency
East Kootenay	Wardner	66.22	41.15	Wardner–Fort Steele Road (Highway 903:1455 north) – Fort Steele	
East Kootenay	Wardner	66.91	41.58	Wardner Bridge across the Kootenay River	
East Kootenay		92.69	57.59	Highway 3 west (Crowsnest Highway) / Highway 95 south – Cranbrook	Fort Steele Interchange; north end of Highway 3 concurrency; south end of Highway 95 concurrency
East Kootenay	Fort Steele	99.69	61.94	Fort Steele Bridge across the Kootenay River	
East Kootenay	Fort Steele	100.83	62.65	Wardner–Fort Steele Road (Highway 903:1455 south) – Wardner	
East Kootenay	Wasa	124.35	77.27	Wasa Bridge across the Kootenay River	
East Kootenay	Wasa	124.48	77.35	Highway 95A south – Kimberley	
East Kootenay		136.92	85.08	Springbrook Bridge across the Kootenay River	
East Kootenay	Canal Flats	165.44	102.80	Canal Flats Bridge across the Kootenay River	
East Kootenay		187.57	116.55	Westside Road (Highway 903:2143 north) – Invermere	
East Kootenay		189.43	117.71	Fairmont Bridge across the Columbia River	
East Kootenay	Fairmont Hot Springs	190.85	118.59	Riverview Road / Fairmont Resort Road	
East Kootenay	Shuswap Indian Band	213.93	132.93	Athalmer Road – Invermere, Panorama	
East Kootenay	Radium Hot Springs	227.09	141.11	Highway 95 north / Forsters Landing Road – Golden	North end of Highway 95 concurrency; south end of Banff–Windermere Highway
Kootenay National Park	Radium Hot Springs	228.36	141.90	West gate of Kootenay National Park	
Kootenay National Park		231.50	143.85	Iron Gates Tunnel	
Kootenay National Park		239.53	148.84	Sinclair Pass – 1,486 m (4,875 ft)	
Kootenay National Park		270.88	168.32	Kootenay Crossing Bridge across the Kootenay River	
Kootenay National Park		321.03	199.48	Vermilion Pass (Continental Divide) – 1,680 m (5,510 ft)	
Kootenay National Park		321.03	199.48	Highway 93 north (Banff–Windermere Highway) – Banff, Lake Louise	Continues into Alberta and Banff National Park
1.000 mi = 1.609 km; 1.000 km = 0.621 mi: Concurrency terminus

== See also ==
- List of British Columbia provincial highways
