= Fort Steele, British Columbia =

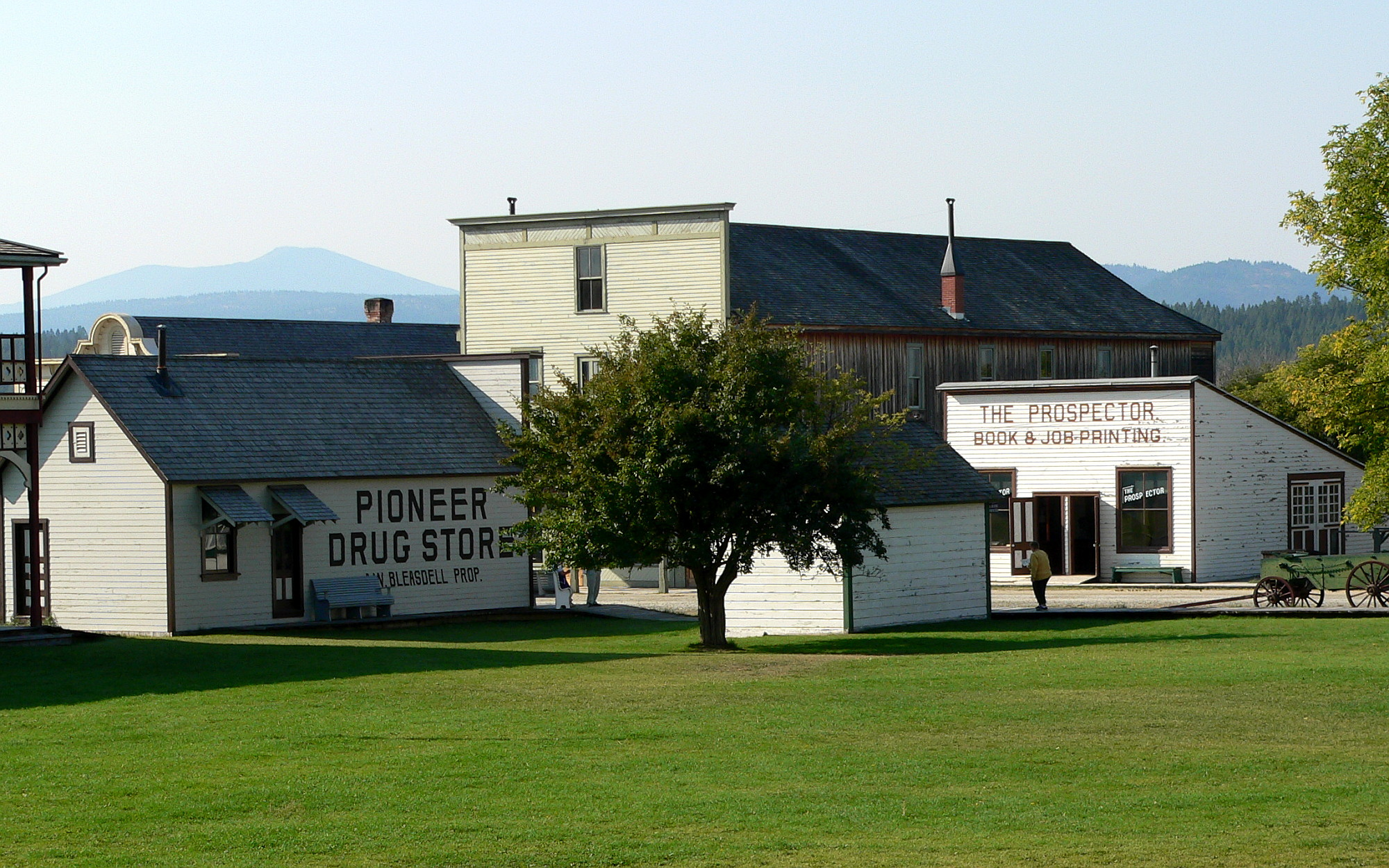
- Commercial buildings, Fort Steele, 2006
- Interactive map of Fort Steele, British Columbia
- Location: East Kootenay, British Columbia, Canada

History
- Founded: 1864

Site notes
- Governing body: Cranbrook Archives, Museum, and Landmark Society (non-profit), Heritage Branch, Province of British Columbia
- Website: www.fortsteeleheritagetown.com

National Historic Site of Canada

Fort Steele is a heritage site in the East Kootenay region of southeastern British Columbia, Canada. This visitor attraction lies on the east shore of the Kootenay River between the mouths of the St. Mary River and Wild Horse River. The locality, on the merged section of highways 93 and 95, is by road about 17 kilometres (11 mi) northeast of Cranbrook and 230 kilometres (143 mi) southeast of Golden.

== Ferry and bridges ==
In 1864, John Galbraith arrived to prospect for gold on Wild Horse Creek but soon switched to more lucrative business opportunities. Later that year, he was granted a charter for a toll ferry across the Kootenay River, commencing in the new year. John also established a general store, which with the ferry, greatly profited from the early goldfield traffic to the Fisherville mining camp. He sent for two of his brothers and his two sisters with their families. Marrying Sarah Larue, John, and his brother Robert Galbraith (known as R.L.T.), purchased land at Joseph's Prairie (later called Cranbrook), where John operated a ranch from 1867.

Horses could ford the river about 370 metres (1,200 ft) downstream from the ferry, which crossed by the mouth of the St. Mary River. The ferry charter was renewed in 1871, 1876, 1880, and 1882. The ferry could carry livestock, but did not appear to have the capacity for a wagon. The annual ferry licence, which was initially $500, was lowered to $200 by 1867, because most miners had abandoned the creek for brighter prospects. In 1874, Robert Galbraith took over the operation, which continued until replaced in 1888 by a lift span bridge. The 1894 flood destroyed this 140-metre (450 ft) structure, which was superseded by Howe truss approaches and an opening span. The 1909 bridge had three spans, the western one being a Howe truss. The 1934 bridge comprised three Howe trusses. When the highway was realigned in 1966, a concrete span was chosen.

== Name origin ==
Once the crossing became known as Galbraith's Ferry, the place assumed the same name. In 1887, Superintendent Sam Steele arrived with a detachment of the NWMP to defuse tensions between settlers and local First Nations. No actual fort existed, but the police compound, erected that year, had the appearance of a fort, because of the few windows. Four constables did not survive the typhoid that struck the contingent. In 1888, the community adopted the rename of Fort Steele.

== Waterway and roads ==
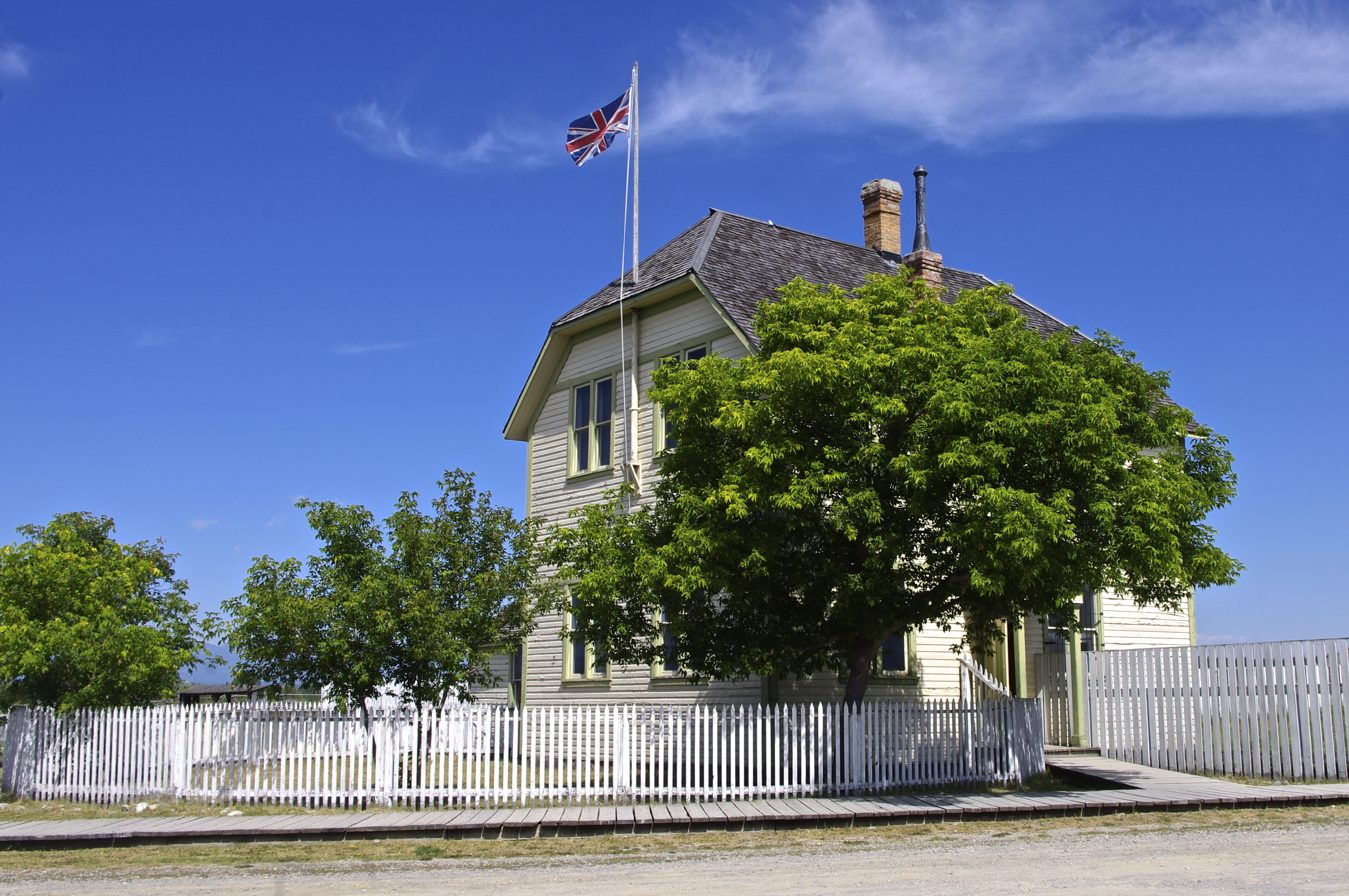
Reconstructed government building, Fort Steele, 2013

Early supplies came in by pack train from Walla Walla, Washington. A wagon road northward to Canal Flats opened in 1886. In summertime, the Golden–Fort Steele passenger service encompassed riverboat, tramway and stage modes.

In 1895, a wagon road to the Elk River was completed, providing a link with Montana. By the late 1890s, two riverboat companies served the Jennings, Montana–Fort Steele run. From 1898, a jitney service connected with the Eager train station.

The highway, which followed Main St, was diverted to the present position in 1965.

== Community ==
In 1864, the population numbered over 3,000, but five years later, few remained, except the numerous mosquitos in summer. By July 1888, the NWMP had been reassigned to Fort Macleod and the detachment buildings abandoned. The settlers, who numbered about 11 Caucasians and 60 Chinese, occupied the few buildings by the river. Chas. Clark was the inaugural postmaster from 1888 to 1897.

In 1892, the commercial centre comprised the government buildings, a hotel, and two stores.

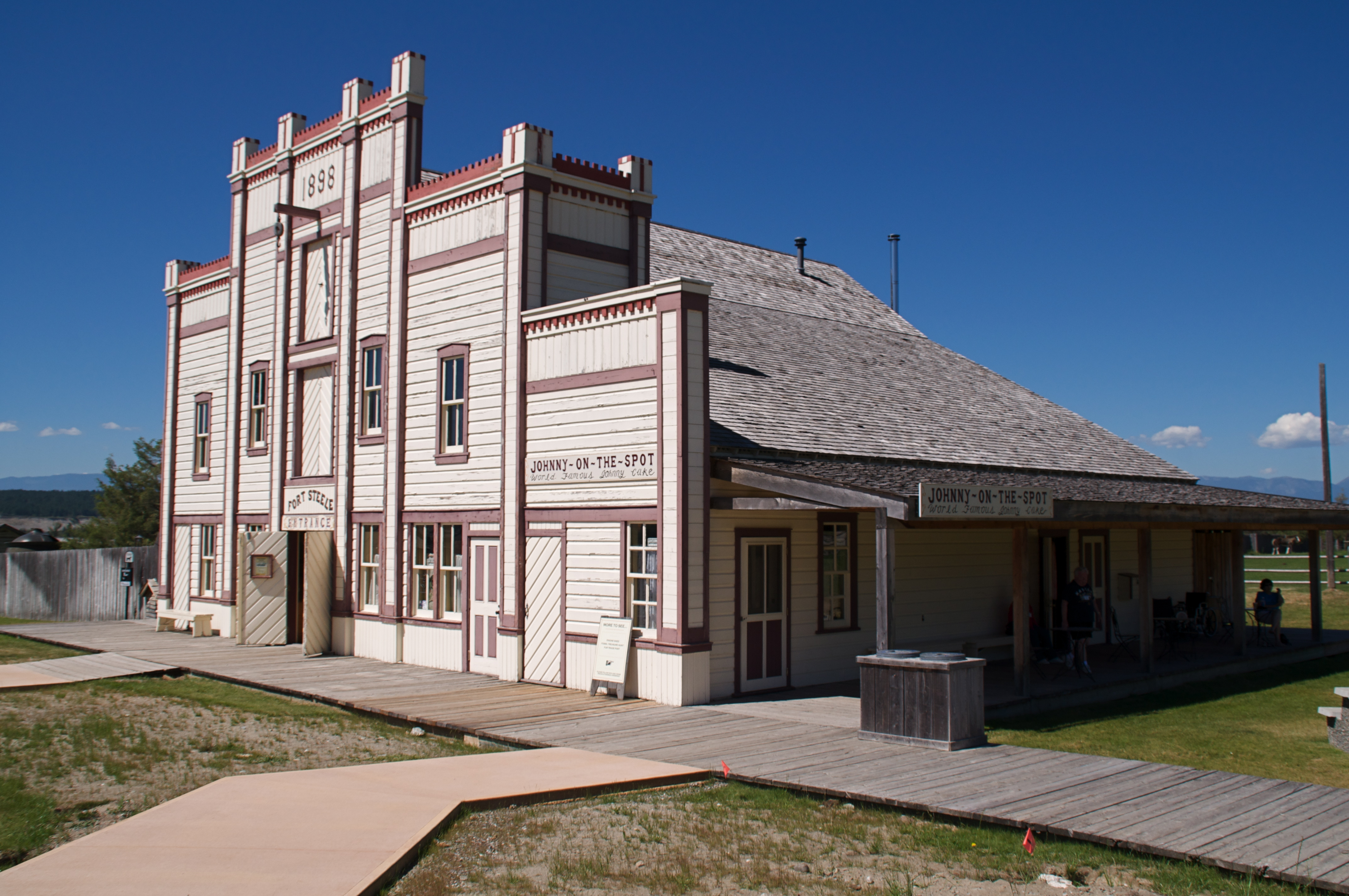
Entry/reconstructed brewery facade, Fort Steele, 2012

In 1894, the townsite was surveyed, Miss Adelaide Bailey became the inaugural teacher, and two hotels were erected. By 1895, Fort Steele was developing into a mining centre. That year, a mining association formed, and the Prospector, the local newspaper, was founded. The infrastructure included two general stores, three hotels, and a sawmill.

In 1897, an annex was added to the Dalgardno Hotel, five further hotels were opened, and the Government Building was erected. On the ground floor were three cells and a courtroom, while upstairs were several offices. Also opened were a hospital, opera house (which soon became a men's club), and a Roman Catholic church. Across the river, warehouses and a bottling plant sprang up. Several new business premises were added to the town, which joined the US telegraph network. A Board of Trade was established. During the first six months of that year, the population grew from about 300 to 3,000.

In 1898, a 91,000-litre; 24,000-US-gallon (20,000 imp gal) water tank was placed atop a 15-metre (50 ft) tower, water mains were installed, a volunteer fire department was founded, and a Presbyterian church erected. When the railway bypassed the town, the exodus of residents began. The Anglicans bought a surplus school building for a church. Henry Kershaw opened a general store and ice cream parlour. In 1899, W.A. Prest established a photo studio.

Census population: Fort Steele
Year	Pop.	±%
1951	349	—
1956	105	−69.9%
1961	125	+19.0%
1966	56	−55.2%
1971	53	−5.4%
1976	40	−24.5%
1981		—
1986	118	—
1991	99	−16.1%
Source: Statistics Canada

In 1900, the men's club built their own clubhouse, and the opera house became the Masonic Lodge. By 1901, businesses were relocating to Cranbrook or Fernie. Cranbrook acquired the government offices in 1904 and the newspaper in 1905. The town was unable to meet the cost of filling the water tank. Lacking this fire protection resource, most of the business section burned to the ground in the December 1906 blaze.

The town soldiered on for decades. The hospital, now a private residence, likely experienced a brief existence beyond the death of Dr. Hugh Watt in 1914. The school closed in 1954, the Windsor Hotel in 1958, the general store in 1961, and the post office in 1997.

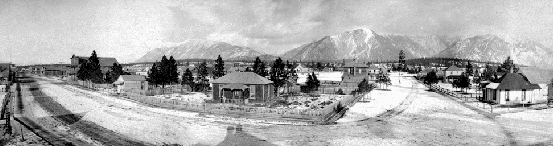
Fort Steele in 1910.

== CP Railway ==
Robert Galbraith, who owned much of the land around Fort Steele, sold a key part of his Joseph's Prairie holdings to Colonel James Baker in 1885.

The B.C. Southern was a Canadian Pacific Railway (CP) subsidiary. In constructing westward from the Crowsnest Pass, many assumed that Fort Steele, the only suitable place of any substance, would be the divisional point. The simple story was that Colonel James Baker willingly gave CP every second townsite lot and the railyard land from his Joseph's Prairie property, knowing he would profit from the development of Cranbrook. Robert Galbraith refused to make a similar concession for a line passing through Fort Steele. The deeper story is that a syndicate, which included Baker and Galbraith, acquired land from them at both locations. By the mid-1890s, the public believed the railway would pass through each location, which increased buyer demand for subdivision lots. In 1898, the railway track crossed the Kootenay River at Wardner, bypassing Fort Steele on the way to Cranbrook.

The Kootenay Central Railway (KCR) was a CP subsidiary. The northward advance of the rail head from Colvalli was near Fort Steele in August 1914. That November, the last spike was driven near the north end of Columbia Lake. Through train service commenced in January 1915.

In 1931, the twice weekly service was reduced to once weekly.

In the early 1970s, the creation of the Lake Koocanusa reservoir behind the Libby Dam necessitated the removal of the Wardner bridge and rerouting the respective track across the Kootenay on the replacement rail bridge built in 1970 at Fort Steele.

== Heritage site ==
=== Overview ===
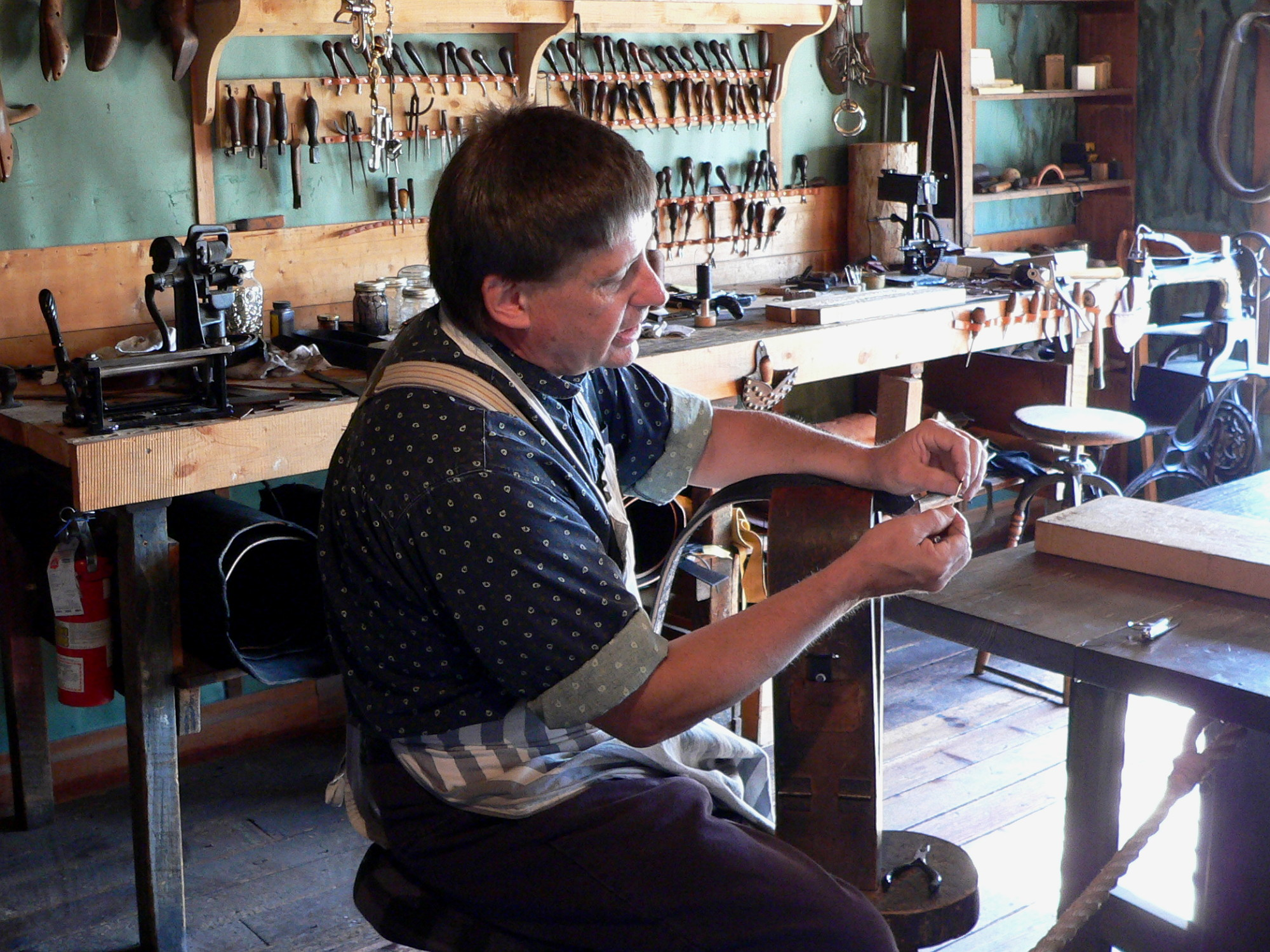
Leather working demonstration.

Being the first NWMP post in BC, Fort Steele was designated a National Historic Site of Canada in 1925. In 1961, the province acquired the site to be a historic park. In 1981, the government released a concept plan. In 1972, the Queen, Prince Philip, and Princess Anne visited the park. In 2004, the non-profit Friends of Fort Steele Society took over full management of Fort Steele Heritage Town. The society managed the site until March 2025, overseeing numerous capital works projects, including the development of a new visitor centre and restoration efforts on the steam train. In support of these initiatives, the Province of British Columbia provided $500,000 in funding, with project completion anticipated for spring 2025.

As of April 1, 2025, the Cranbrook Archives, Museum and Landmark Society (CAMAL) began a six-year operations contract with the Province, with potential for renewal. CAMAL was selected as the new site operator through a publicly posted request-for-proposals process in late 2024.

Authentic Fort Steele buildings, some of which were moved to within the present site, include the schoolhouse, two churches, the Opera House, and Windsor hotel. The site includes some reconstructed replicas, smaller buildings salvaged from the region, a selection of early machinery, and railway artifacts. Actors wander the town in period costumes. The Wildhorse Theatre stages live productions. Visitors can have their images captured in old-time brownish tones at the photo studio, practise gold panning, take horse-drawn rides, and watch demonstrations, such as blacksmithing. Meals are available in the International Hotel restaurant and snacks at the City Bakery.

=== Railway ===
During summer, steam train rides are offered on a 2.5-mile (4 km) return journey, with a short stop at the "St. Mary's look-out".

The locomotive fleet is the following:

- A Pacific Coast Shay locomotive (115) built for logging operations on Vancouver Island. The 115 is unusual because it was constructed out of two damaged shays. The 115 is currently the largest shay class locomotive in Canada. Owing to major issues with the boiler, the 115 is not in operation.
- A 2-6-2 prairie class locomotive (1077) built in 1923 for logging work on Vancouver Island. The 1077 is the main locomotive used at the fort. The 1077 was retired by its owner in 1969, making it one of the last steam locomotives in active service in Canada. After being sold to the B.C government, The 1077 was rebuilt and used as a rolling museum train until it was put into storage in 1979. The 1077 was moved to Fort Steele in 1990 to replace the 115 Shay. The 1077 has featured in several movies, including The Grey Fox, The Journey of Natty Gann, and Shanghai Noon.

Other rolling stock includes three flat cars (two of which that have been modified for use as open air passenger cars), a British Rail Mark 1, a small parlour car (originally used as the main car but retired due to interior damage), a Morrissey, Fernie & Michel Railway (MF&M) baggage trolley, a CP caboose, MF&M snow plows, and two tank cars used for fuel storage.

== Notable people ==
- William Astor Drayton (1888–1973), mining magnate, was an intermittent resident 1924–1944.

== See also ==
- Barkerville, British Columbia, a similar operation.
- List of heritage railways in Canada
- List of museums in Canada
- Snow Queen, a fantasy film shot on site.
