= Radium Hot Springs, British Columbia =

Radium Hot Springs
- Village
- Village of Radium Hot Springs
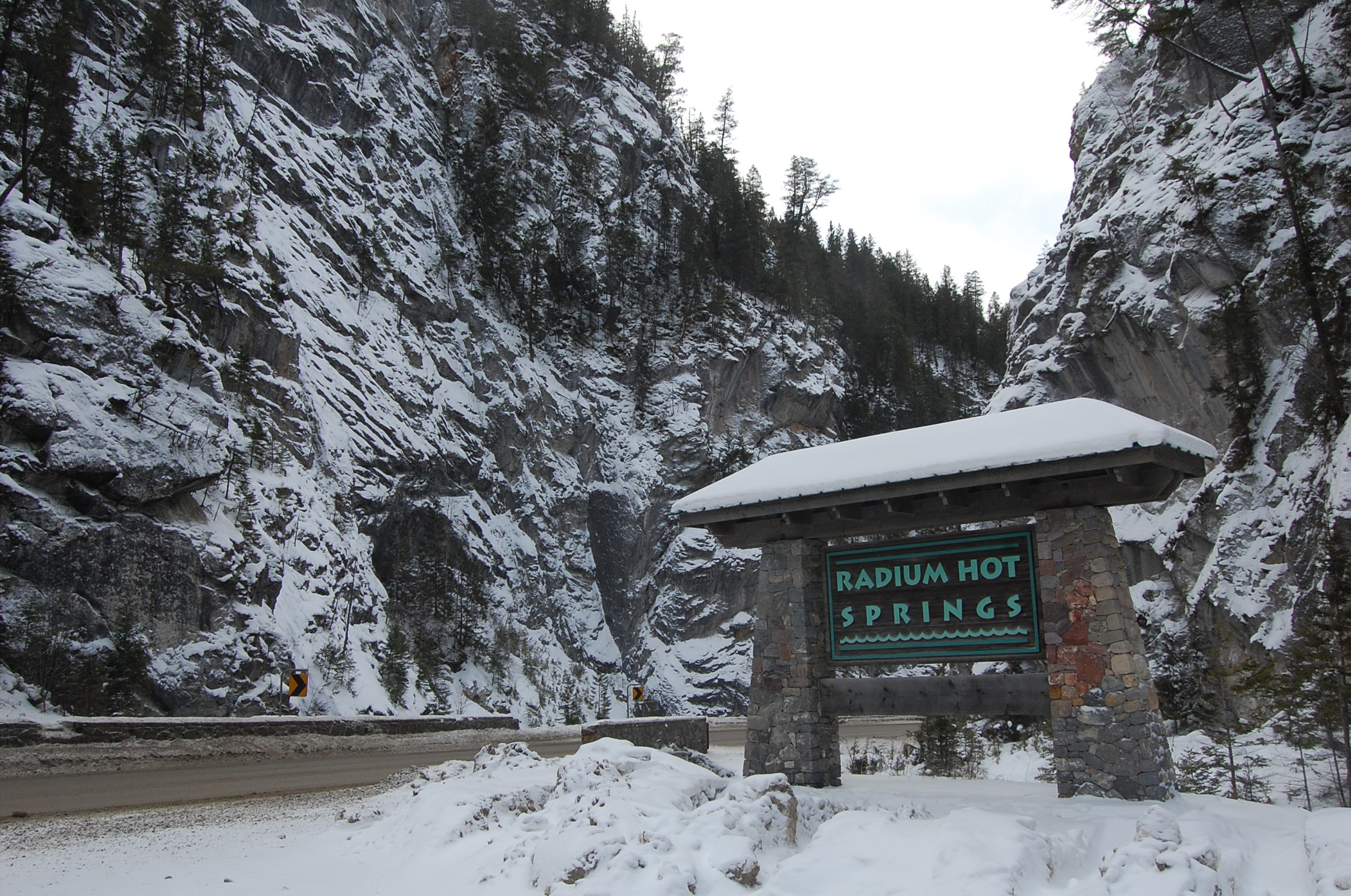

- Location of Radium Hot Springs in British Columbia
- Coordinates: 50°37′03″N 116°04′19″W
- Country: Canada
- Province: British Columbia
- Region: Columbia Valley/East Kootenay (Canadian Rockies)
- Regional district: East Kootenay
- Incorporated: 1991

Government
  - Governing body: Radium Town Council
  - Mayor: Cris A. Leonard

Area
  - Land: 6.34 km^{2} (2.45 sq mi)
- Elevation: 808 m (2,651 ft)

Population (2021)
  - Total: 1,339
  - Density: 211.3/km^{2} (547/sq mi)
- Time zone: UTC−6 (CST)
- Postal code: V0A 1M0
- Area code: 250 / 778 / 236
- Website: radiumhotsprings.ca

Radium Hot Springs, informally and commonly called Radium is a village of 1,339 residents in the East Kootenay region of British Columbia. The village is named for the hot springs in the nearby Kootenay National Park. From Banff, Alberta, it is accessible via Highway 93.

The hot springs were named after the radioactive element when an analysis of the water showed that it contained small traces of radon which is a decay product of radium. The radiation dosage from bathing in the pools is inconsequential: approximately 0.13 millirems (1.3 microsieverts) from the water for a half-hour bathing, around ten times average background levels. The air concentration of radon is about 850 becquerels per cubic metre (23 picocuries per litre) which is higher than the level (200 Bq/m^{3} or 5.4 pCi/L) at which mitigation within two years is encouraged at residences; but is also inconsequential (about 0.7 mrem or 7.0 μSv for a half-hour bathing) from a dose impact perspective.

== Geography ==
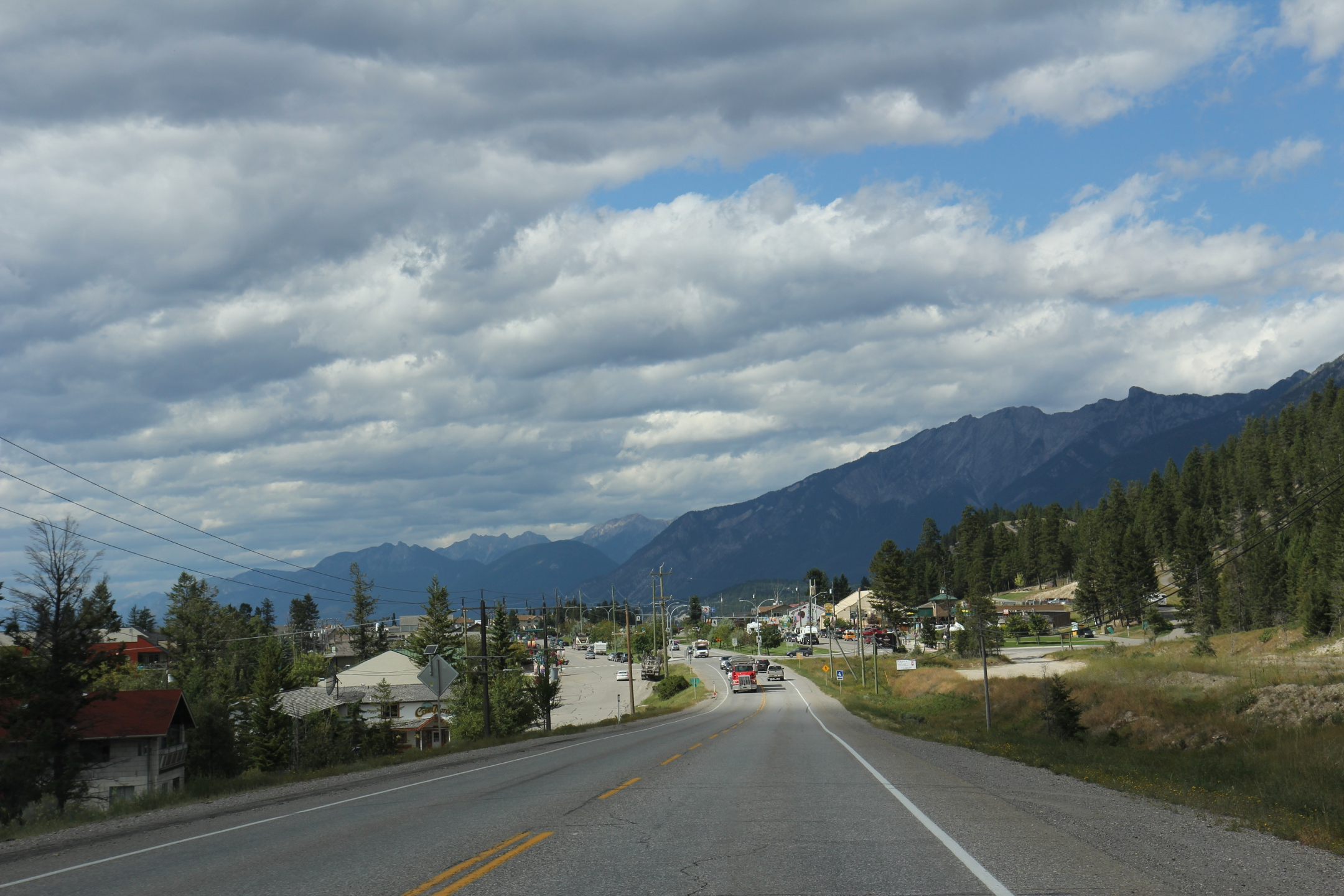
Looking north on BC Hwy 93/95 at Radium Hot Springs

Radium is 16 km north of Invermere, and 105 km south of Golden, British Columbia. It is at the junction of Highway 95 and Highway 93, in the Columbia River valley, between the river and Kootenay National Park.

Wildlife in the area includes mule deer, grizzly bears, black bears, mountain goats and Rocky Mountain bighorn sheep.

== Demographics ==
In the 2021 Census of Population conducted by Statistics Canada, Radium Hot Springs had a population of 1,339 living in 634 of its 1,366 total private dwellings, a change of 72.6% from its 2016 population of 776. With a land area of 6.34 km^{2} (2.45 sq mi), it had a population density of 211.2/km^{2} (547.0/sq mi) in 2021.

== Economy ==
Baymag mines magnesium out of Mount Brussilof, 35 kilometres from town. The deposit was discovered in 1966. Proven reserves in excess of 50 million tonnes of magnesite ore were found. The ore is trucked to Exshaw, Alberta for calcination, other processes and onwards sale.

== Amenities ==
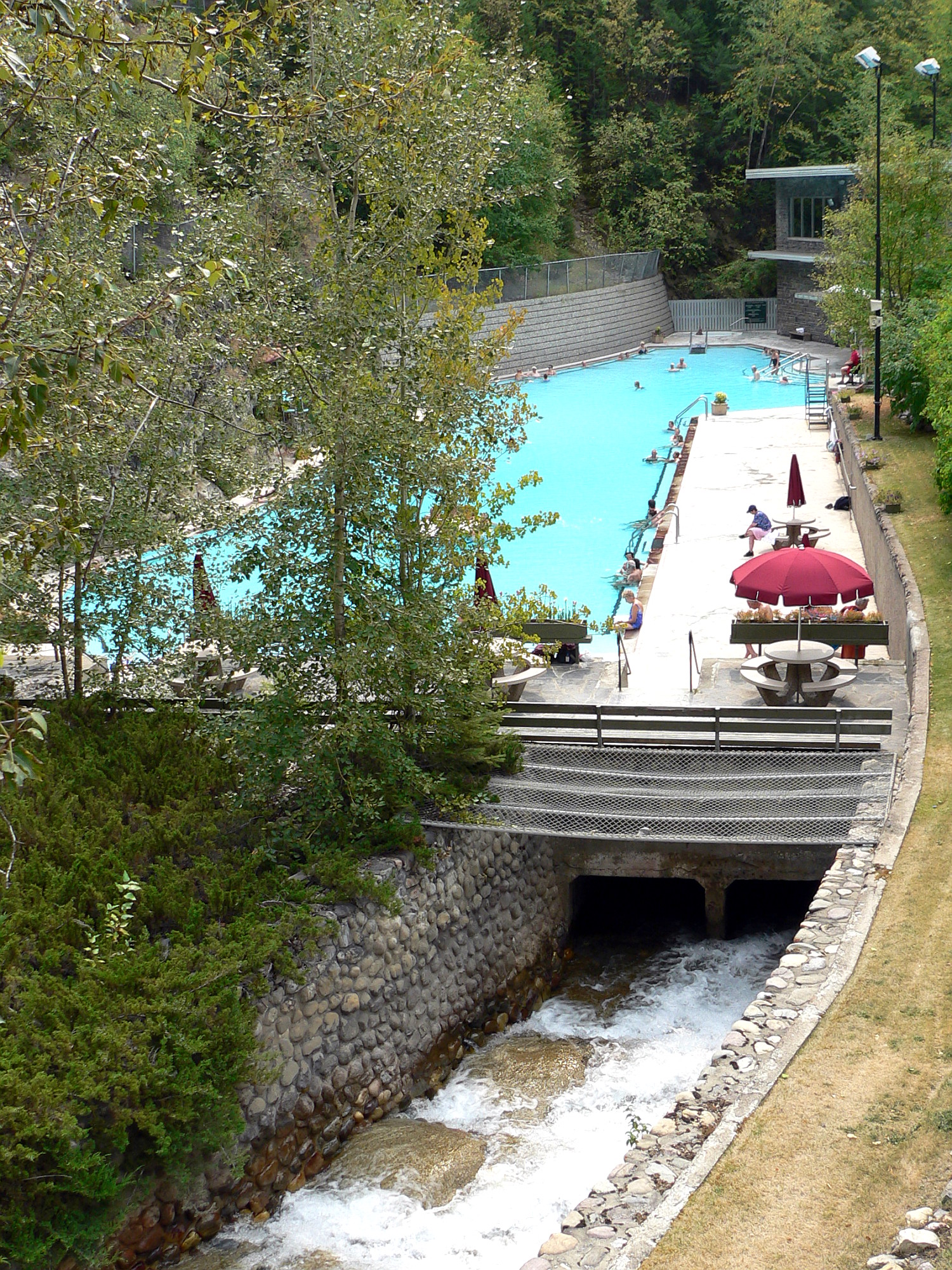
The hot-water pool at Radium Hot Springs.

Several golf courses are located nearby, along with 675 hotel and motel rooms.

=== Kootenay National Park ===
The southwestern entrance to Kootenay National Park is located immediately east of the village limits, with Highway 93 leading into the park lined with motels.

=== Hot springs ===
The hot springs complex itself is located just within the national park and contains two large pools, one with hot water for soaking (usually around the temperature of 39 °C or 102 °F), the other a 25 m swimming pool that is usually around 29 °C (84 °F). There is also a hot-tub-sized pool that has been dubbed the "Plunge Pool", because the water can be hot – right from the source at 44 °C (111 °F) – or cold, right from a creek running beneath the pools.

== See also ==
- List of francophone communities in British Columbia
