= Regional District of East Kootenay =

Regional district in British Columbia, Canada

East Kootenay
- Regional district
- Regional District of East Kootenay
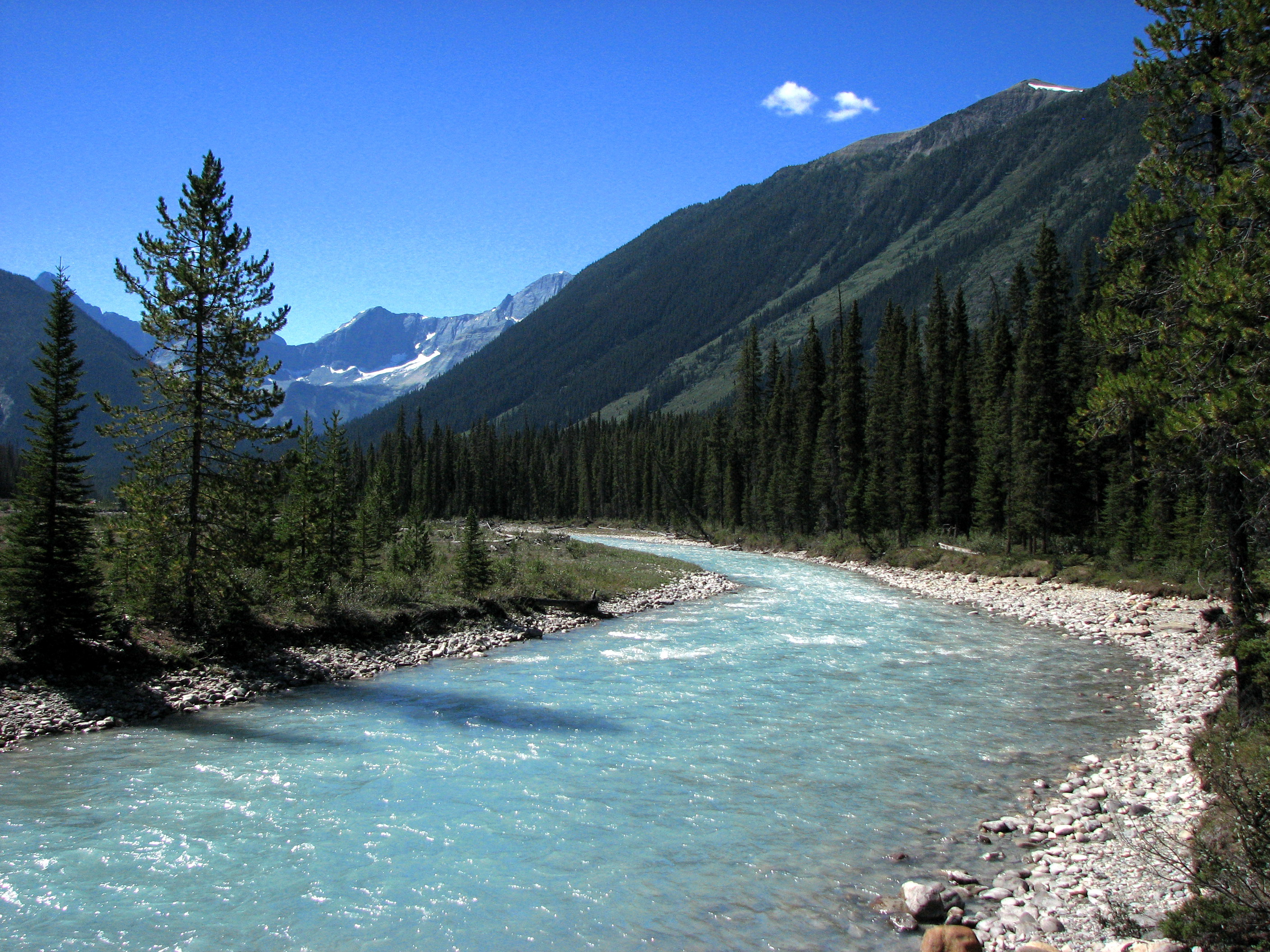
- Kootenay National Park

- Logo

- Major communities

- Location in British Columbia
- Coordinates: 49°55′00″N 115°45′00″W
- Country: Canada
- Province: British Columbia
- Administrative office location: Cranbrook

Government
  - Type: Regional district
  - Body: Board of directors
  - Chair: Rob Gay (C)
  - Vice chair: Susan Clovechok (F)
  - Electoral areas: A, B, C, E, F, G

Area
  - Land: 27,514.1 km^{2} (10,623.3 sq mi)

Population (2021)
  - Total: 65,896
  - Density: 2.4/km^{2} (6.2/sq mi)
- Time zone: UTC−06:00 (Central Time)
- Website: www.rdek.bc.ca

The Regional District of East Kootenay (RDEK) is a regional district in the Canadian province of British Columbia, Canada. In the 2021 census, the population was 65,896. Its area is 27,514.1 km^{2} (10,623.3 mi^{2}). The regional district offices are in Cranbrook, the largest community in the region. Other important population centres include the cities of Kimberley and Fernie, and the district municipalities of Invermere and Sparwood. Despite its name, the regional district does not include all of the region known as the East Kootenay, which includes the Creston Valley and the east shore of Kootenay Lake.

== Geography ==
The regional district's dominant landform is the Rocky Mountain Trench, which is flanked by the Purcell Mountains and Rocky Mountains on the east and west, and includes the Columbia Valley region, the southern half of which is in the regional district (its northern half is in the Columbia-Shuswap Regional District). Another distinct area within the regional district is the Elk Valley in the southern Rockies, which is the entrance to the Crowsnest Pass and an important coal-mining region. Other than the Columbia and Kootenay Rivers, whose valleys form the bottomlands of the Rocky Mountain Trench, also included in the regional district are the northernmost parts of the basins of the Flathead, Moyie and Yahk Rivers (the Moyie and Yahk are tributaries of the Kootenay, flowing into it in the United States, and the Flathead is a tributary of the Clark Fork in Montana).

== Demographics ==
As a census division in the 2021 Census of Population conducted by Statistics Canada, the Regional District of East Kootenay had a population of 65,896 living in 28,264 of its 35,931 total private dwellings, a change of 9% from its 2016 population of 60,439. With a land area of 27,514.1 km^{2} (10,623.3 sq mi), it had a population density of 2.4/km^{2} (6.2/sq mi) in 2021.

Panethnic groups in the East Kootenay Regional District (1996−2021)
Panethnic group	2021		2016		2011		2006		2001		1996	
Panethnic group	Pop.	%	Pop.	%	Pop.	%	Pop.	%	Pop.	%	Pop.	%
European (Note: Statistic includes all persons that did not make up part of a visible minority or an indigenous identity.)	55,750	86.54%	52,340	88.36%	50,385	90.5%	50,520	92.05%	51,740	92.57%	52,560	93.9%
Indigenous	5,495	8.53%	4,705	7.94%	3,780	6.79%	3,425	6.24%	2,890	5.17%	2,110	3.77%
Southeast Asian (Note: Statistic includes total responses of "Filipino" and "Southeast Asian" under visible minority section on census.)	840	1.3%	550	0.93%	285	0.51%	130	0.24%	275	0.49%	155	0.28%
South Asian	825	1.28%	355	0.6%	250	0.45%	150	0.27%	300	0.54%	350	0.63%
East Asian (Note: Statistic includes total responses of "Chinese", "Korean", and "Japanese" under visible minority section on census.)	780	1.21%	670	1.13%	545	0.98%	485	0.88%	420	0.75%	505	0.9%
African	395	0.61%	305	0.51%	165	0.3%	50	0.09%	155	0.28%	115	0.21%
Latin American	190	0.29%	145	0.24%	90	0.16%	15	0.03%	70	0.13%	50	0.09%
Middle Eastern (Note: Statistic includes total responses of "West Asian" and "Arab" under visible minority section on census.)	25	0.04%	60	0.1%	0	0%	70	0.13%	0	0%	10	0.02%
Other (Note: Statistic includes total responses of "Visible minority, n.i.e." and "Multiple visible minorities" under visible minority section on census.)	100	0.16%	110	0.19%	145	0.26%	30	0.05%	40	0.07%	125	0.22%
Total responses	64,420	97.76%	59,235	98.01%	55,675	98.22%	54,885	98.92%	55,890	99.29%	55,975	99.31%
Total population	65,896	100%	60,439	100%	56,685	100%	55,485	100%	56,291	100%	56,366	100%

- Note: Totals greater than 100% due to multiple origin responses.

== Municipalities ==
Municipality	Government Type	Population
Cranbrook	city	20,047
Kimberley	city	8,115
Fernie	city	5,249
Sparwood	district municipality	3,784
Invermere	district municipality	3,391
Jumbo Glacier	former mountain resort municipality	0
Elkford	district municipality	2,499
Radium Hot Springs	village	776
Canal Flats	village	668

== Health care ==
The largest hospital in the region is the East Kootenay Regional Hospital in Cranbrook. There are also hospitals in Creston (Creston Valley Hospital), Fernie (Elk Valley Hospital), and Invermere (Invermere & District Hospital). Primary health centers are present in Sparwood and Elkford.

== First Nations ==
The First Nations people who live in the East Kootenay are from the Ktunaxa Nation and Shuswap Nation. There are currently five bands Columbia Lake First Nation near Windermere, Lower Kootenay First Nation near Creston, St. Mary's First Nation near Cranbrook, and Tobacco Plains First Nation near Grasmere, and the Shuswap Indian Band near Invermere.

== See also ==
- Findlay Creek
