= Fernie Alpine Resort =

Ski resort in British Columbia, Canada

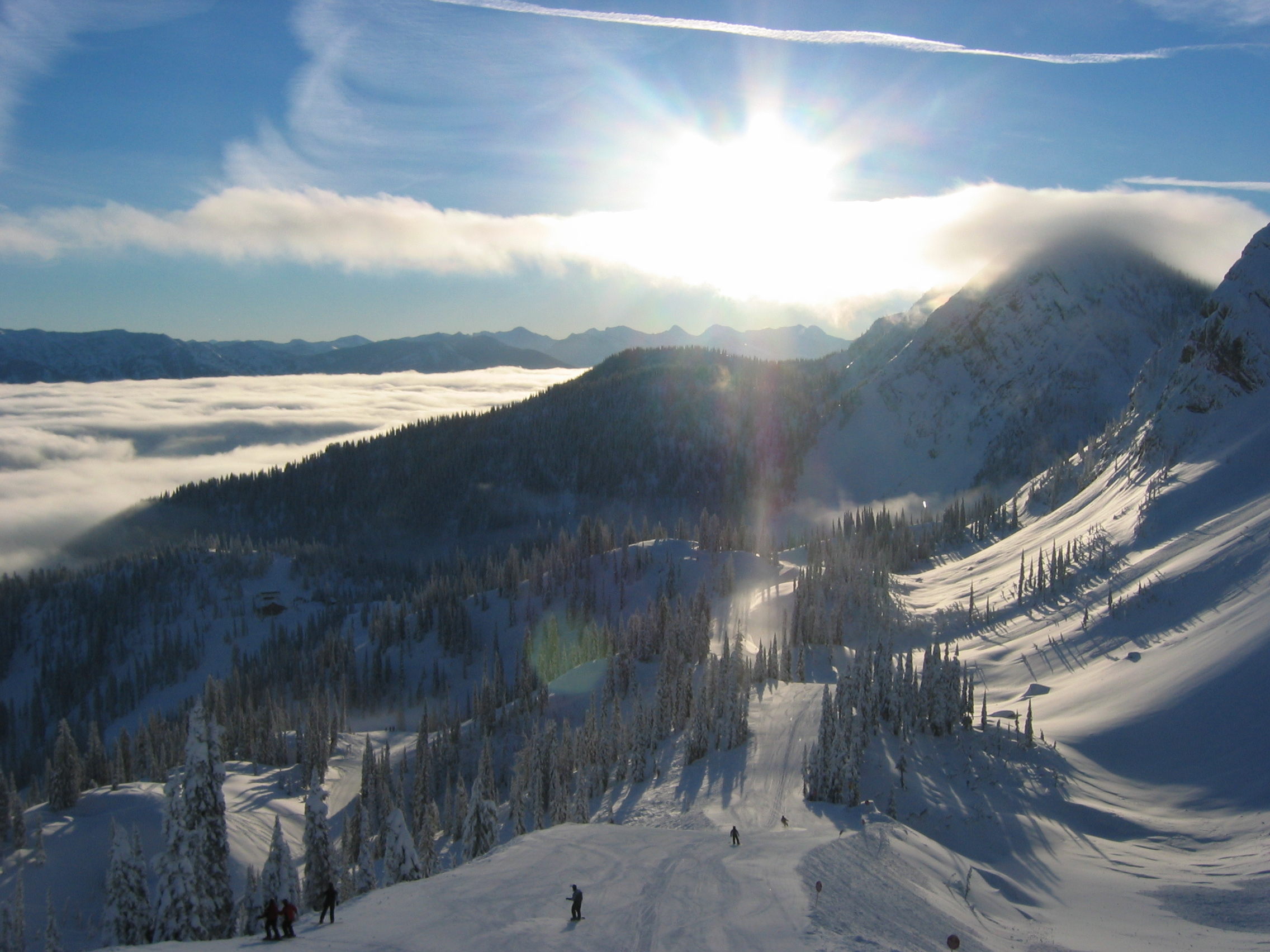
- Timber Bowl, as seen from the top of the White Pass Quad.

- Location within British Columbia Location within Canada
- Location: British Columbia, Canada
- Nearest city: Fernie
- Coordinates: 49°27′45″N 115°05′13″W
- Status: Operating
- Owner: Resorts of the Canadian Rockies
- Vertical: 1,082 m (3,550 ft)
- Top elevation: 2,149 m (7,051 ft)
- Base elevation: 1,068 m (3,504 ft)
- Skiable area: 2,500 acres (10.1 km^{2})
- Trails: 142
- Longest run: 5 km
- Lift system: 7 chairlifts 3 surface lifts
- Snowfall: 875 cm (28.71 ft)/year
- Website: skifernie.com

Fernie Alpine Resort is a ski resort, located on Lizard Range, near the town of Fernie, British Columbia in Canada. The resort also operates a mountain bike park, hiking, guided hikes, and sightseeing in the summer months.

The resort has 10 lifts servicing 142 named runs, 5 alpine bowls, and tree skiing with a vertical drop of 1,082 meters (3,550 ft). The resort has over 10.1 square kilometres (2,500 acres) of skiable terrain. The average annual snowfall is 875 centimetres (28.71 ft).

Fernie Alpine Resort is owned by the Resorts of the Canadian Rockies, which also owns ski areas Kimberley Alpine Resort, Kicking Horse Resort, Nakiska, Mont Sainte-Anne, and Stoneham.

== History ==
Fernie Alpine Resort was originally called "Fernie Snow Valley" before being sold in 1997 to RCR (Resort of the Canadian Rockies). RCR saw some financial trouble under its owner, Charlie Locke, and after a period in bankruptcy protection, was bailed out by Alberta billionaire N. Murray Edwards.

During spring 2009, Fernie Alpine Resort was transformed into the fictional Kodiak Valley ski resort, ca. 1986, for exterior location shots of the Hollywood film Hot Tub Time Machine. The film was released in March 2010.

== Bowls ==
Fernie Alpine Resort has five bowls along the Lizard Range. Siberia Bowl, Cedar Bowl, Timber Bowl, Currie Bowl, and the Lizard bowl.
