= N. Murray Edwards =

Canadian businessman (born 1959)

N. Murray Edwards CM
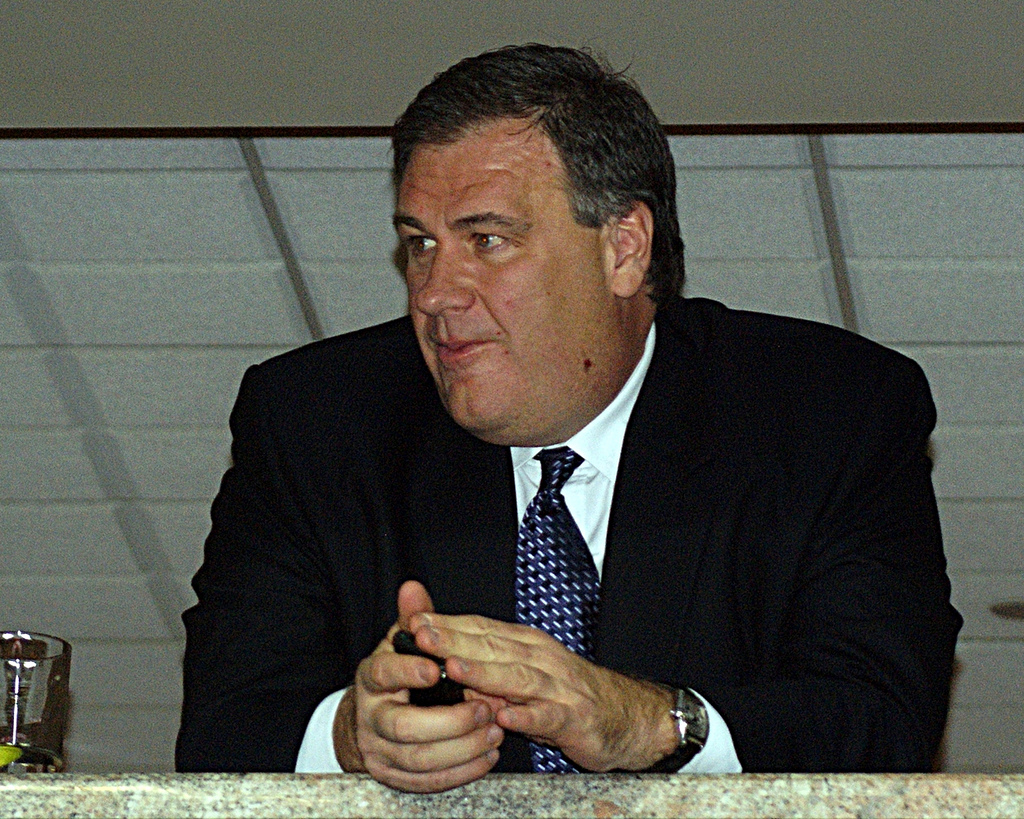
- Edwards in 2011
- Born: December 10, 1959 (age 66); Regina, Saskatchewan, Canada
- Education: University of Saskatchewan (BCom); University of Toronto (LLB)
- Occupation: Lawyer
- Spouse: Lysanne Legare
- Children: 1

Norman Murray Edwards CM (born December 10, 1959) is a Canadian oil sands financier. He heads an ownership group called the Calgary Sports and Entertainment Corporation (CSEC) that manages Calgary's Scotiabank Saddledome and owns the Calgary Flames, Calgary Hitmen, Calgary Roughnecks, Calgary Stampeders, and Calgary Wranglers. With an estimated net worth of US$2.7 billion (as of December 2022), Edwards was ranked by Forbes as the 32nd wealthiest Canadian and 1511th in the world. Edwards has launched several major Canadian companies, including Canadian Natural Resources Ltd, Magellan Aerospace and Ensign Energy Services Inc.

== Early life ==
N. Murray Edwards was raised in Regina, Saskatchewan, the grandson of English and Welsh immigrants and homesteaders. His father was an accountant, and his mother a primary school teacher. As a youth, Edwards developed an early interest in hockey, working as a hockey referee while in high school. He was also drawn to politics and public affairs, attending high school conferences on government and policy.

== Post-secondary education and honorary degrees ==
Edwards studied at the University of Saskatchewan, graduating with a Bachelor of Commerce (great distinction), after which he obtained an LL.B from the University of Toronto (honors) in 1983. He would later also receive an honorary Doctor of Laws degree from the University of Saskatchewan and the University of Calgary. In 2013, he received an honorary law degree from the University of Toronto. Through a substantial contribution to the University of Saskatchewan in 2007, the College of Commerce was renamed the N. Murray Edwards School of Business. He was appointed as a member of the Order of Canada in 2013.

== Career ==
Edwards has significant financial interest in the Canadian oil sands. His company, Canadian Natural Resources, plans to spend $25 billion to turn the bitumen-bearing sand found in northern Alberta into barrels of crude oil. Edwards also owns stakes in Ensign Energy, Canada's second biggest oil services company, and Magellan Aerospace Corporation. In the Calgary Herald’s 2015 executive compensation survey, Edwards’ 2014 earnings as chairman of Calgary-based Canadian Natural Resources Ltd. were rated fourth highest of the city’s 100 largest publicly traded companies at $12.7 million. He also earned almost $2 million as chairman of Ensign Energy Services Inc. Much of his compensation from both companies was in the form of stock options. Edwards owns Resorts of the Canadian Rockies, which owns Fernie Alpine Resort, Kimberley Alpine Resort, Nakiska, Stoneham Mountain Resort, Mont-Sainte-Anne, and Kicking Horse Resort. He owns shares of the Calgary Flames hockey team. Edwards is Chairman of the Board of Magellan Aerospace Corporation and the majority holder of Magellan Aerospace, owning ~76% of Common Shares.

Edwards was top shareholder and director of Penn West Petroleum Ltd. He later stepped down in 2005 when the company became a trust. In 1992 Edwards hired Bill Andrew to take over Penn West, which was a smaller company with few staff and limited production. Since then Penn West became one of Canada's largest oil companies.

In 2018, as CEO of Canadian Natural Resources Limited, Edwards placed seventh out of 100 of the top earners in Calgary with a total compensation of $10,764,001 according to a Global Governance Advisors' survey posted by The Calgary Herald.

As at 2025 Edwards was the Chairman of the Board of Directors, and the largest shareholder, of Imperial Metals.

== Politics ==
Firms associated with Edwards have donated a total of $436,227 to the B.C. Liberal Party since 2005, including $153,480 from Canadian Natural Resources, which he chairs, as well as $131,390 from Imperial Metals, where he is the controlling shareholder. In 2013, he helped organize a $1-million fundraiser in Calgary for B.C. Premier Christy Clark’s re-election bid.

== See also ==
- Canadian Natural Resources
- Imperial Metals

Sporting positions
Preceded by Nelson Skalbania	Calgary Flames owner 1982–present	Incumbent
