= Nakiska =

Ski resort in Alberta, Canada

Nakiska Ski Resort

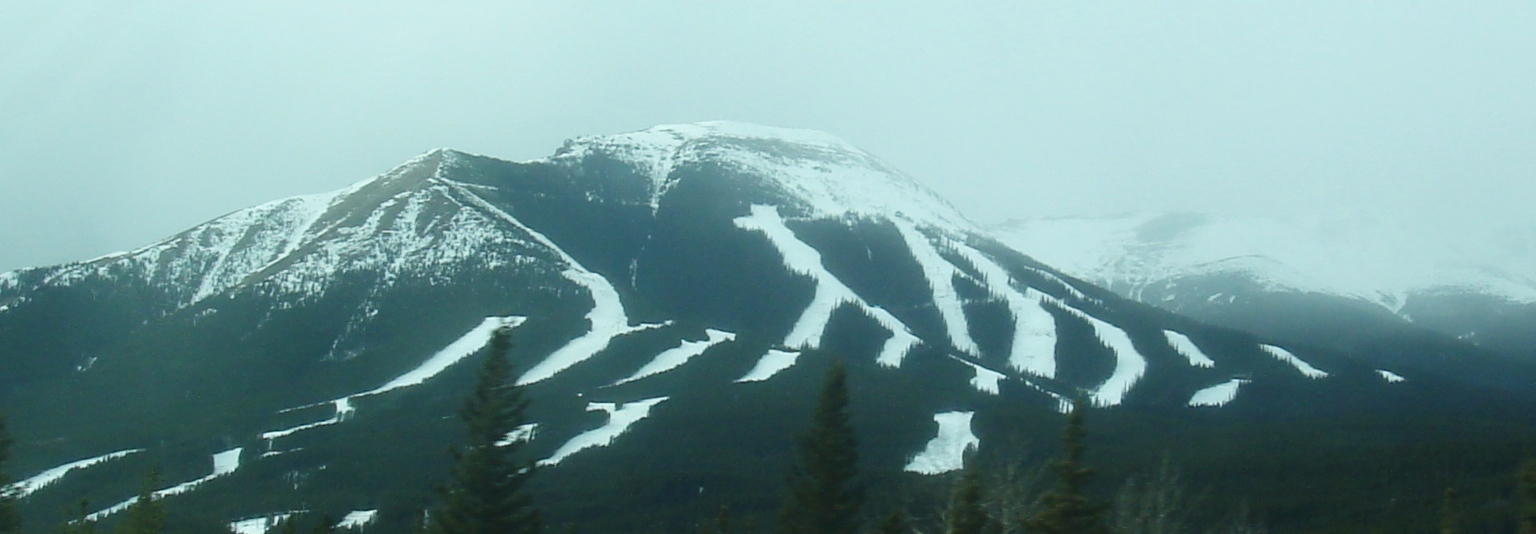
- Slopes of Nakiska on Mount Allan in March 2007

- Location in Canada Nakiska Ski Resort (Canada)
- Location: Mount Allan, Kananaskis, Alberta, Canada
- Nearest city: Calgary: 83 km (52 mi)
- Coordinates: 50.944°N 115.147°W
- Vertical: 735 m (2,411 ft)
- Top elevation: 2,260 m (7,410 ft)
- Base elevation: 1,525 m (5,003 ft)
- Skiable area: 1,021 acres (4.13 km^{2})
- Trails: 64; 16% - Easiest; 70% - More Difficult; 10% - Most Difficult; 4% - Expert
- Longest run: 3.3 km (2.1 mi)
- Lift system: 4 Chairlifts: 3 High Speed Quads; 1 Double; 1 Magic Carpet
- Lift capacity: 8,830 / hr
- Snowfall: 250 cm (100 in)
- Snowmaking: Extensive, 75%
- Night skiing: No
- Website: skinakiska.com

Nakiska is a ski resort in western Canada, in the Kananaskis Country region of the province of Alberta. It is located 83 km (52 mi) from Calgary, west on Highway 1 (Trans-Canada Highway) and south on Highway 40 (Kananaskis Trail). "Nakiska" is a Cree word meaning "to meet" or "meeting place."

Set on the east face of the southern end of Mount Allan, Nakiska has 64 trails with four chairlifts (3 high-speed quads and 1 double), 1 Reg Magic Carpet and 1 Monster Carpet) set up over an area of 3 km^{2} (1.2 sq mi). The longest run has 3.3 km (2.1 mi), from a top lift-served elevation of 2,258 m (7,408 ft) to the base at 1,479 m (4,852 ft).

Nakiska is owned by Resorts of the Canadian Rockies, which also owns the Fernie, Kimberley, Kicking Horse Mountain Resort, Mont Sainte Anne, and Stoneham ski resorts.

== History ==
The site was selected in 1983 and opened for skiing in the fall of 1986, in preparation for the 1988 Winter Olympics. Pre-Olympic races on the North American Cup circuit (Nor-Am) were held in December 1986 and World Cup downhill and super G races were held in March 1987.

At the 1988 Winter Olympics, Nakiska hosted the ten alpine events, as well as freestyle moguls skiing, then a demonstration event. A temporary surface lift to the gusty top of the mountain was used for the men's downhill event. This poma can be seen from the top of the "Gold Chair" and is sometimes used for avalanche control. The starting gate of the men's Olympic downhill was at 2,412 m (7,913 ft), 154 m (505 ft) above the present lift-served summit. That race was postponed a day due to 98 mph (158 km/h) winds at the summit.

In 2008, Nakiska was named the official training centre of Alpine Canada (ACA). Each year Nakiska welcomes alpine teams from around the world for early season ski training. During the summer of 2008 the ski area embarked on a series of renovations. Snowmaking enhancements increased capacity by 33%. The 100-metre Monster Magic Carpet was added and the creation of a dedicated Training Run was completed on Mapmaker.

In 2009, in preparation for the 2010 Winter Olympics in Vancouver, more enhancements occurred. A new high-speed quad lift was installed (Gold Chair Express), replacing the original fixed-grip (Gold) triple chairlift. The ride time is 4.7 minutes, less than half of the previous chair's 9.7 minutes.

In 2009 new ski trails were also created with the addition of the new Monster Glades (trails in the trees).

The Olympic flame still burns at the entrance to the resort. Of note is that the men's downhill shown on the board inside the restaurant is not the actual run used. With test skiers saying the proposed run was too easy, the men's downhill course was changed with only 3 days to go, leaving no time to change the course board which had already been painted and mounted on the wall inside the restaurant.

On November 13, 2017, the French Alpine ski racer David Poisson died in a crash during training.

== Climate ==
A weather station located west of the ski area records temperature and wind speed. The station is above the tree line at an elevation of 2,543 m (8,343 ft). It has reported wind gusts as high as 219 km/h (136 mph)

Climate data for Nakiska Ridgetop 1994-2020
Month	Jan	Feb	Mar	Apr	May	Jun	Jul	Aug	Sep	Oct	Nov	Dec	Year
Record high °C (°F)	9.4 (48.9)	6.8 (44.2)	9.1 (48.4)	13.6 (56.5)	17.6 (63.7)	22.2 (72.0)	25.0 (77.0)	25.5 (77.9)	24.3 (75.7)	17.6 (63.7)	9.0 (48.2)	9.3 (48.7)	25.5 (77.9)
Mean daily maximum °C (°F)	−5.6 (21.9)	−6.6 (20.1)	−4.4 (24.1)	−0.5 (31.1)	4.8 (40.6)	8.6 (47.5)	13.7 (56.7)	13.0 (55.4)	7.8 (46.0)	1.5 (34.7)	−3.5 (25.7)	−6.5 (20.3)	1.9 (35.4)
Daily mean °C (°F)	−8.8 (16.2)	−10.0 (14.0)	−7.6 (18.3)	−4.1 (24.6)	1.3 (34.3)	5.2 (41.4)	9.7 (49.5)	9.0 (48.2)	4.3 (39.7)	−1.6 (29.1)	−6.5 (20.3)	−9.6 (14.7)	−1.6 (29.1)
Mean daily minimum °C (°F)	−12.0 (10.4)	−13.3 (8.1)	−10.8 (12.6)	−7.7 (18.1)	−2.1 (28.2)	1.6 (34.9)	5.6 (42.1)	5.0 (41.0)	0.9 (33.6)	−4.7 (23.5)	−9.4 (15.1)	−12.7 (9.1)	−5.0 (23.0)
Record low °C (°F)	−36.5 (−33.7)	−37.2 (−35.0)	−35.2 (−31.4)	−25.6 (−14.1)	−14.5 (5.9)	−6.9 (19.6)	−7.2 (19.0)	−4.6 (23.7)	−16.2 (2.8)	−24.3 (−11.7)	−34.0 (−29.2)	−36.1 (−33.0)	−37.2 (−35.0)
Source: Environment Canada

== See also ==
- List of ski areas and resorts in Canada
- 1988 Winter Olympics
