= Nowitka =

Canadian sternwheel steamboat

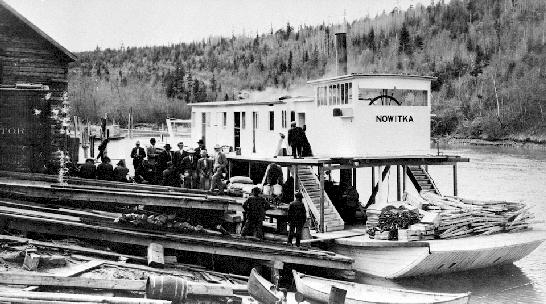
- Nowitka loading at Golden, British Columbia for its first commercial trip on the Columbia River, 1911.

History
- Name: Nowitka (CAN #130604)
- Owner: Golden Columbia River Lumber Company
- Port of registry: Golden, British Columbia
- Route: Inland British Columbia on the Columbia River in the Columbia Valley
- Builder: George Rury
- Launched: 1911 at Golden, British Columbia
- Out of service: May 1920
- Fate: Abandoned 1920

General characteristics
- Type: Inland passenger/freighter
- Tonnage: 113 gross tons; 62 registered tons
- Length: 80.5 ft (25 m)
- Beam: 19 ft (6 m)
- Depth: 3.5 ft (1 m) depth of hold
- Installed power: twin steam engines, horizontally mounted, 8" bore by 30" stroke, 2 nominal horsepower, manufactured 1840 by G.A. Ponbriand, Sorel, Quebec
- Propulsion: sternwheel
- Notes: Engines were over 70 years old when installed. Some of upperworks came from North Star

Nowitka was a sternwheel steamboat that operated in British Columbia on the Columbia River from 1911 to May 1920. The name is a Chinook Jargon word usually translated as "Indeed!" or "Verily!".

== Design and construction ==
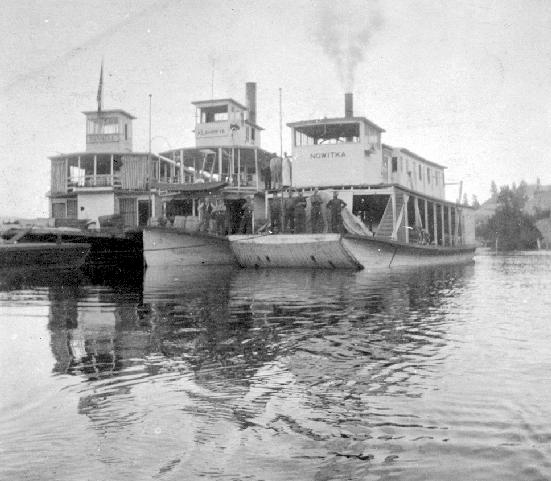
Nowitka (right), Klahowya (center), and Isabella McCormack, converted to houseboat (left), at Althalmer, British Columbia c. 1913

Nowitka was built at Golden, British Columbia for the Golden Columbia River Lumber Company. Nowitka's engines were over 70 years old, and had been originally built for a ferry crossing the St. Lawrence River. The engines had been previously installed in other sternwheelers on the upper Columbia River, including the 1886 Duchess, the 1888 Duchess and Ptarmigan. The blunt-ended bow of Nowitka allowed the vessel to be readily capable of pushing barges, which increased the vessel's utility and effective cargo capacity.

== Operations ==
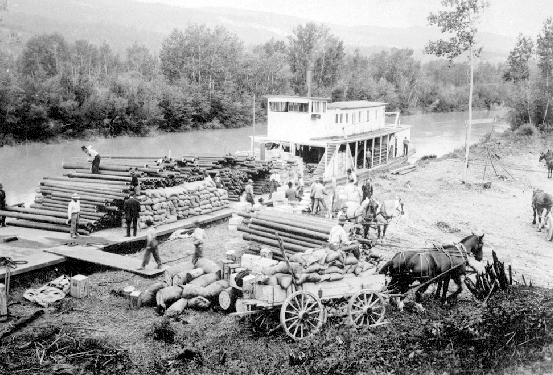
Nowitka and barge unloading construction supplies at landing at Edgewater, British Columbia, 1914

Nowitka was placed on the Columbia River route that began at Golden and ran south, at least during high water, to Columbia Lake, the ultimate source of the Columbia River. Nowitka was last used to haul supplies to construct a bridge at Brisco, British Columbia.

== Removal from service ==
Following construction of the bridge at Brisco, Nowitka was taken out of service in May 1920, and abandoned near the sawmill wharf at Golden. Nowitka was the last steamboat to operate on the Columbia River in the Columbia Valley, although gasoline and diesel powered vessels did run later on the river.
