= Resorts of the Canadian Rockies =

Canadian ski operator

Resorts of the Canadian Rockies Inc. (RCR) is the largest private ski resort owner/operator in Canada, owning six ski resorts across Canada.

== Current properties ==
The company owns Nakiska in Alberta as well as Fernie Alpine Resort, Kimberley Alpine Resort and Kicking Horse Mountain Resort in British Columbia. Resorts outside the Canadian Rockies are Mont-Sainte-Anne and Stoneham Mountain Resort in Quebec.

RCR also owns and manages a number of hotels, backcountry lodges and golf courses, including Trickle Creek Golf Resort and Trickle Creek Lodge in Kimberley, Wintergreen Golf and Country Club in Bragg Creek, and The Slope Side (formerly Wolf's Den) and Lizard Creek Lodges in Fernie.

== History ==
RCR was previously owned by Charlie Locke before he saw some financial trouble, and after a period in bankruptcy protection, was bailed out by Alberta billionaire N. Murray Edwards in 2001.

RCR previously operated Fortress Mountain Resort, Lake Louise Mountain Resort, Wintergreen Ski Area and West Louise Lodge.

On December 29, 2011, RCR purchased Kicking Horse Mountain Resort from original developer Ballast Nedam.

Resorts of the Canadian Rockies (RCR) has faced significant controversies regarding its management of Mont-Sainte-Anne, primarily due to perceived underinvestment and safety concerns.

=== Safety Incidents and Infrastructure Issues ===
Between 2020 and 2022, Mont-Sainte-Anne experienced multiple lift-related incidents that raised serious safety concerns:

- February and March 2020: The gondola suffered sudden stoppages, resulting in several injuries and hospitalizations.
- December 2022: A gondola cabin detached and fell, fortunately without injuries. This incident led the Quebec Building Authority to order the suspension of all aerial lifts at the resort until comprehensive safety inspections and corrective measures were implemented.

These events highlighted maintenance deficiencies and a lack of timely infrastructure upgrades under RCR’s ownership.

March 2025: At Kicking Horse Mountain Resort, a gondola cabin detached and fell.

=== Community and Government Response ===
The local community and government officials expressed increasing frustration with RCR’s management:

- April 2021: The Quebec government initiated legal proceedings to regain control over certain lands around Mont-Sainte-Anne, citing RCR’s failure to fulfill development commitments outlined in agreements dating back to 1994 and 2008.
- October 2022: Groupe Le Massif, another ski resort operator in Quebec, offered to purchase Mont-Sainte-Anne with plans for significant investment. However, RCR declined the offer, leading to further disappointment among stakeholders seeking improved management and development.
