= Klahowya =

Klahowya may refer to:

- Klahowya (sternwheeler), a sternwheel steamer
- Klahowya Secondary School, Silverdale, Washington
- MV Klahowya, an Evergreen State Class ferry
