= Golden Secondary School =

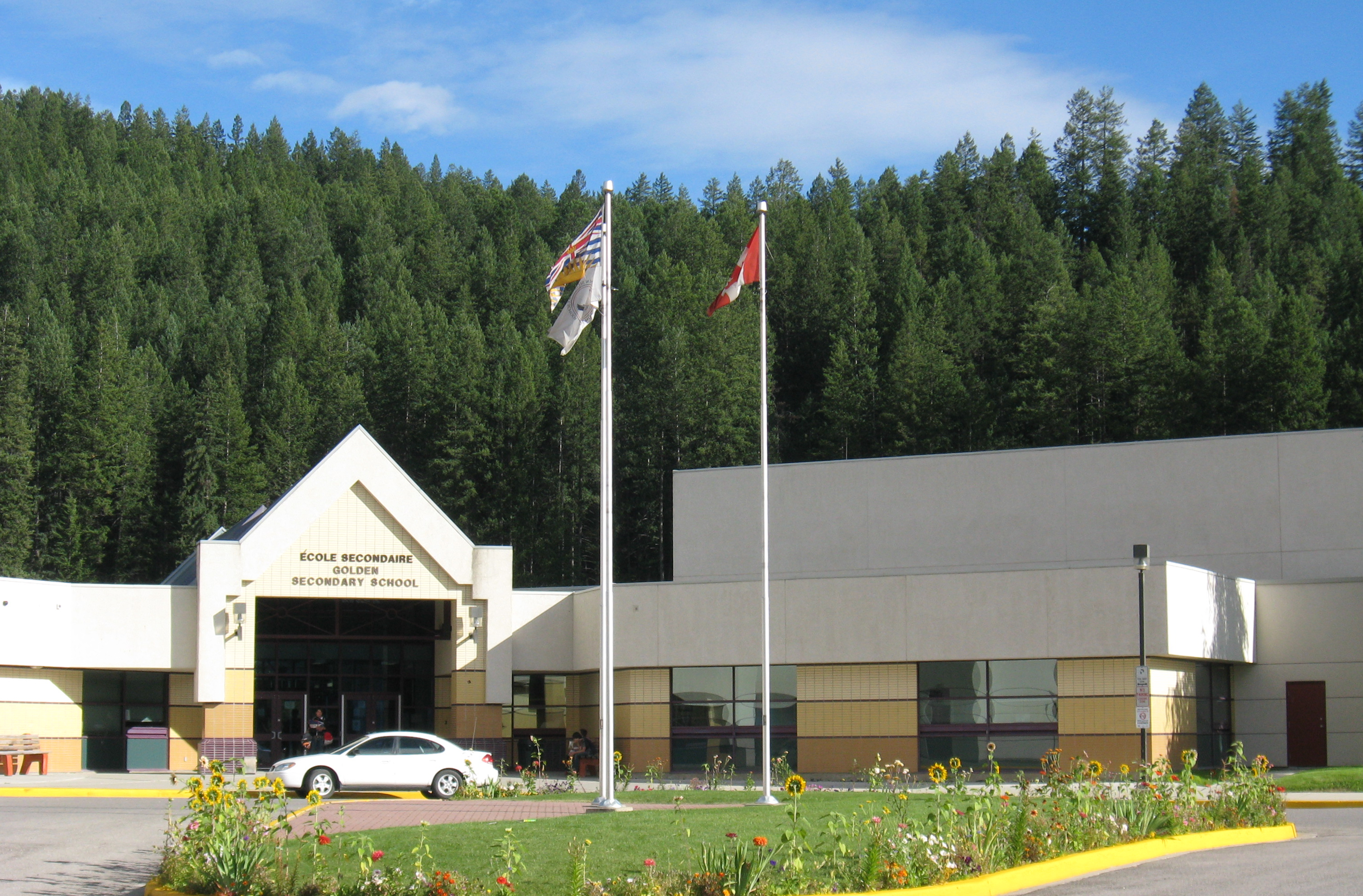

Location
- Box 1350; Golden, British Columbia, V0A 1H0; Canada; 51.2970°N 116.9496°W

Information
- School type: Public, Secondary School
- Motto: The Freedom to Soar
- School board: School District 6 Rocky Mountain
- Superintendent: Aaron Callaghan
- School number: 618005
- Principal: Kelsey Doolaar
- Staff: 32
- Grades: 8-12
- Enrollment: 385 (2025/2026)
- Colours: White, Red, Yellow
- Mascot: Eagle
- Team name: Eagles
- Website: gss.sd6.bc.ca
- Last updated: October 3, 2026

Golden Secondary School is a dual-track public high school in Golden, British Columbia, part of School District 6 Rocky Mountain. The school is headed by principal Mike Archibald. There is a wide variety of courses held in the school and outside the school. Courses include things such as skiing and snowboarding on the beautiful Kicking Horse Mountain Resort, mountain biking on many trails around Golden and the school also hosts many bantam and senior basketball, volleyball and soccer teams, and Boggle tournaments. The most notable thing about this school is the Jam Session, which features groups of talented adolescents playing songs they wrote or love to hear to their peers.

The facility also hosts Golden Alternate School, which is a program that provides additional services to "independently driven" students.
