= Ptarmigan (sternwheeler) =

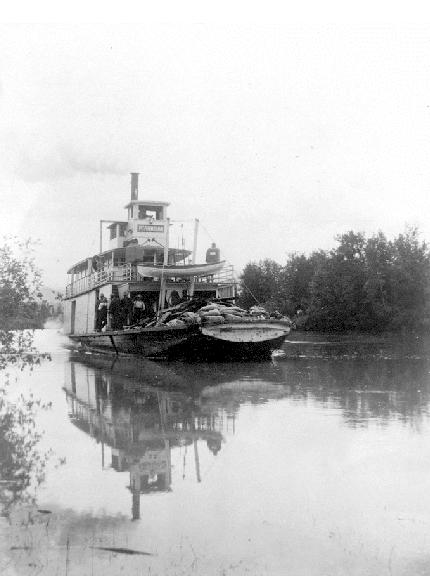
- Ptarmigan on the Columbia River c. 1905

History

Canada
- Name: Ptarmigan, CAN #111950
- Owner: Upper Columbia Navigation and Tramway Company; Columbia River Lumber Company
- Operator: Frank P. Armstrong
- Port of registry: Golden, British Columbia
- Route: Inland British Columbia on the Columbia River in the Columbia Valley
- Launched: 1903 at Golden, British Columbia
- Fate: Dismantled 1909, engines to Nowitka
- Notes: Sank in 1907 but raised; caught fire 1907, upper works destroyed, reconstructed and operated for another year

General characteristics
- Type: inland passenger/freighter
- Tonnage: 246.5 gross tons; 155 registered tons
- Length: 110 ft (34 m)
- Beam: 20.5 ft (6 m)
- Depth: 4.0 ft (1 m) depth of hold
- Installed power: twin steam engines, horizontally mounted, 8" bore by 30" stroke, 2 nominal horsepower, manufactured 1840 by G.A. Ponbriand, Sorel, Quebec
- Propulsion: sternwheel
- Notes: Engines were over 60 years old when installed.

Ptarmigan was a sternwheel steamboat that operated in British Columbia on the Columbia River from 1903 to 1909.

== Design and construction ==
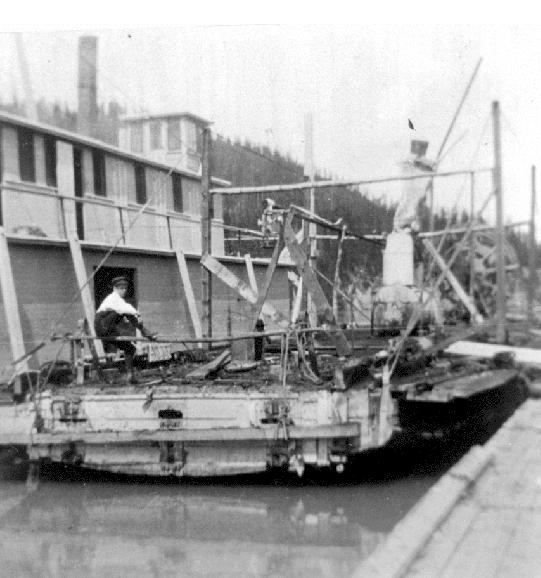
Ptarmigan after the fire in 1908. The vessel on the left may be Isabella McCormack, which appears to have been the only other large steamer on the route in 1908.

Ptarmigan was built at Golden, British Columbia and was the last vessel built for the Upper Columbia Navigation and Tramway Company, of which Captain Frank P. Armstrong was the principal owner and manager. Ptarmigan's engines were over 60 years old, and had been originally built for a ferry crossing the St. Lawrence River. The engines had been previously installed in two other sternwheelers on the upper Columbia River: the 1886 Duchess, and the 1888 Duchess. The blunt-ended bow of Ptarmigan allowed the vessel to be more capable of pushing barges, which increased the vessel's utility and effective cargo capacity.

== Operations ==
Ptarmigan was placed on the Columbia River route that began at Golden and ran south, at least during high water, to Columbia Lake, the ultimate source of the Columbia River. In 1903, soon after completion, Ptarmigan was sold to the Columbia River Lumber Company, which hired Armstrong to manage its steamboat operations. In 1907 Ptarmigan hit a snag and sank (A snag is a sunken log jammed in the river bottom but sticking up through the water to just below the surface). Captain Armstrong was able to raise Ptarmigan and return her to service. However Ptarmigan caught fire later in 1907, and her upper works were destroyed. Again, Ptarmigan was salvaged, her upper works were rebuilt and she was returned to service.

== Race with launch Gian ==
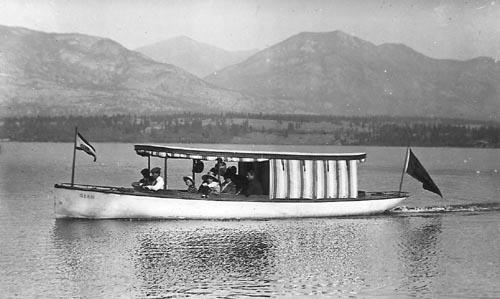
The gasoline launch Gian, from which Northcote Cantlie taunted Captain Armstrong of Ptarmigan into racing.

The gasoline engine was a new development in the early 1900s. Captain Northcote Cantlie, who has gone down in history as "an eccentric Scot" purchased a gasoline-engined launch, Gian, and placed her on the upper Columbia. Unlike Armstrong, Cantlie came from a wealthy background, drank champagne for breakfast, and kept a bagpiper as his personal attendant.

Cantlie, knowing that Gian was at least theoretically faster than Ptarmigan made several challenges to Armstrong to race. There is a story that one day in late August 1906 Cantlie was out in his launch in the river at the same time as Ptarmigan. Cantle seized the moment and sped past Ptarmigan with his bagpiper blasting out airs as Gian sped past. This was too much for Captain Armstrong, a master steamboat man and veteran of the Klondike Gold Rush. Armstrong ordered full steam ahead, and when Ptarmigan caught up to Gian, two or three roustabouts reached over to Gian, seized the still-playing piper, and lifted him unharmed over to the foredeck of Ptarmigan while the piper reportedly never missed a note. Ptarmigan passed Gian and thereafter Cantlie steered clear of the big steamer.

== Dismantled ==
Ptarmigan was dismantled in 1909. Ptarmigan's engines, which had been under water at least twice when the vessels they powered sank (once with Ptarmigan, once with the first Duchess) were installed in another vessel, the Nowitka.
