= Murray Edwards =

Murray Edwards may refer to:

- N. Murray Edwards, Canadian businessman and co-owner of the Calgary Flames
- Murray Edwards College, Cambridge, a women's college in England
