= Isabella McCormack =

Early 20th-century steamboat operating on the Columbia River

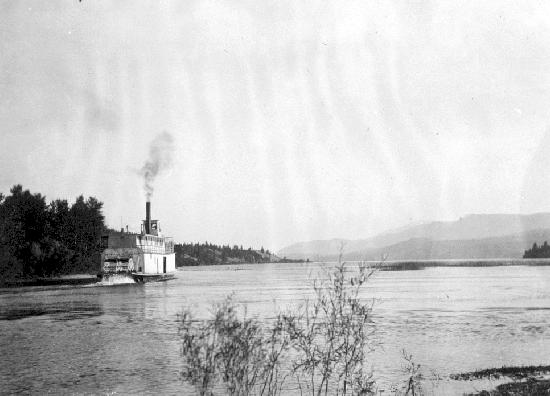
- Isabella McCormack entering Windermere Lake, c. 1909

History

Canada
- Name: Isabella McCormack, later known as Isabel (CAN #122399) or Isabelle
- Owner: Columbia River Lumber Company
- Port of registry: Golden, BC
- Route: Inland British Columbia on the Columbia River in the Columbia Valley
- Builder: Alexander Blakely
- Launched: 1908 at Golden, BC
- Out of service: 1910
- Fate: Converted to floating houseboat and hotel
- Status: Unknown after 1914

General characteristics
- Type: inland passenger/freighter
- Tonnage: 178 gross tons; 112 registered tons
- Length: 94.9 ft (29 m)
- Beam: 18.8 ft (6 m)
- Depth: 3.5 ft (1 m) depth of hold
- Installed power: Twin steam engines, horizontally mounted, 7" bore by 42" stroke, 3 nominal horsepower, manufactured 1896 by Albion Iron Works
- Propulsion: sternwheel
- Notes: Engines installed in steamer Klahowya

Isabella McCormack (sometimes known as Isabel, Isabell or Isabelle) was a sternwheel steamboat that operated in British Columbia on the Columbia River from 1908 to 1910.

== Design and construction ==
Isabella McCormack was built at Golden, BC by Alexander Blakely for the Columbia River Lumber Company, and was intended to be a replacement for Ptarmigan.

== Operations ==
Isabelle McCormack was placed on the Columbia River route that began at Golden and ran south, at least during high water, to Columbia Lake, the ultimate source of the Columbia River. While the vessel was the fastest steamboat on the route, she was not a success.

== Conversion to houseboat ==
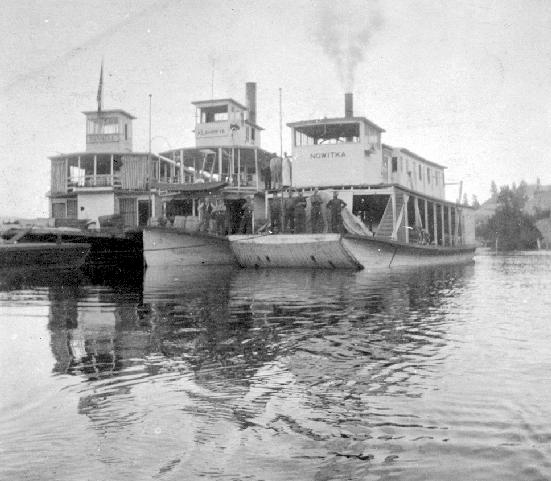
Isabel McCormack as houseboat on left, Klahowya center and Nowitka on right

In 1910 Isabella McCormack was converted into a floating houseboat and hotel. Her engines were removed and installed in a new sternwheeler, Klahowya. The vessel remained in houseboat use until 1914.
