= Fortress Mountain Resort =

Ski resort in Alberta, Canada

Fortress Mountain
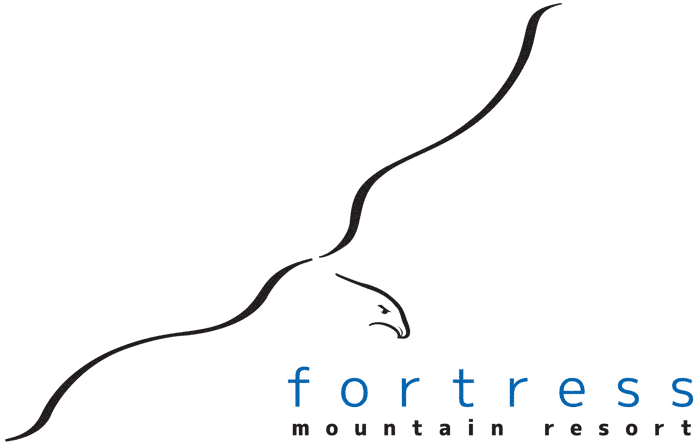

- Location within Alberta Location within Canada
- Location: Kananaskis, Alberta; Canada
- Nearest city: Calgary; 115 km (71 mi)
- Coordinates: 50°49′40″N 115°12′06″W
- Vertical: 700 m (2,300 ft)
- Top elevation: 2,500 m (8,200 ft)
- Base elevation: 1,800 m (5,900 ft)
- Snowfall: 600–900 cm (236–354.5 in)

Fortress Mountain was a ski resort in Kananaskis Country, Alberta, Canada.

The resort is situated on a 14.7-square-kilometre (3,600-acre) Provincial Crown Lease surrounded by Spray Valley and Peter Lougheed Provincial Parks. The original lease was granted in 1967, which pre-dates both Kananaskis Country itself by eleven years, as well as the provincial parks which now surround it.

The resort is located near the Kananaskis Trail, 115 km (71 mi) west of Calgary. It is owned and operated by Fortress Mountain Holdings Ltd.

The resort is currently being used by Canadian climate researchers to gather data on the effects of climate change on the region.

== History ==
Snowridge was the original name of the resort when it opened in 1967. It operated until 2005, when it shut down suffering from neglect.

Before being purchased by Fortress Mountain Holdings Ltd., the area had previously been owned by Banff Rail Company, as well as Resorts of the Canadian Rockies (RCR). Aspen Skiing Co. owned the resort in the 1970s and 1980s.

In late November 2009, scenes from the film Inception were shot there. In December 2011, the resort hosted the cast and crew from The Bourne Legacy. The area has been featured in many other movies, such as The Claim (2000), Van Helsing (2004), Brokeback Mountain (2005), RV (2006), The Revenant (2015), and Jumanji: The Next Level (2019), as well as many television commercials.

== Historic ski lifts ==
In the 1980s, an additional surface lift was installed parallel to the back side of the Curve T-bar to bring skiers from the base of the far-side chair back up to the front side. One summer, Hugh Smythe, then manager of Blackcomb, who also worked at Fortress, took this additional lift apart and took it to Blackcomb Mountain and installed it on Blackcomb glacier, thereby making Blackcomb's high alpine glacier more accessible.

The now dismantled Curve T-Bar lift installed at Fortress Mountain was of novel design. It operated in a big loop, draped over a ridge, so that it could pull skiers up both sides of the ridge with a single motor and loop of cable. There was not a similar lift in the Canadian Rockies for the very good reason that any breakdown shut down both sides of the ridge.

== Current status ==
Cat skiing began in January 2011, utilizing a Pisten Bully 300 with a 14-passenger cab and a Bombardier BR400 with a 12-passenger cab.

These public lands are currently the subject of both "leases" (meaning exclusive possession) of a small portion of the site and "licences to occupy" (meaning open to the public) on the majority of the site, the access road and the bridge. The lands are administered by Alberta Environment and Parks (AEP).

Repairs have been made to the access bridge across the Kananaskis river, the access road to the tenure's alpine site, and the roads internal to the tenure. The two T-Bars have been removed, as have the old rental shop and staff housing buildings. Public access is available for KPOW! cat skiing customers and hikers. There is active avalanche control on the property including the access road therefore it is advisable to contact FMH for latest conditions and closures.

The Fortress Mountain Resort ski hill was to reopen in December 2023 according to Fortress Mountain Holdings president Chris Chevalier. The first phase of the reopening was to include five lifts, a new day lodge and infrastructure work. In the meantime, the access road remains closed to public access. The company is seeking investors for the eventual addition of overnight accommodations for visitors. The resort originally opened in 1967 and closed in 2004.

Canadian climate researchers are currently using Fortress Mountain Resort to gather data on the effects of climate change on the region. The University of Saskatchewan's Centre for Hydrology is monitoring the snow, water and weather on the mountain to create more accurate predictions of flood, drought and water supply. Data is collected from the ground and drones equipped with various sensors, including a Light Detection and Ranging sensor. Key staff members work on the mountain to maintain the access road and carry out avalanche control, providing researchers with the ability to access the mountain's various hydrometric stations.
