= David Poisson (alpine skier) =

French alpine skier (1982–2017)

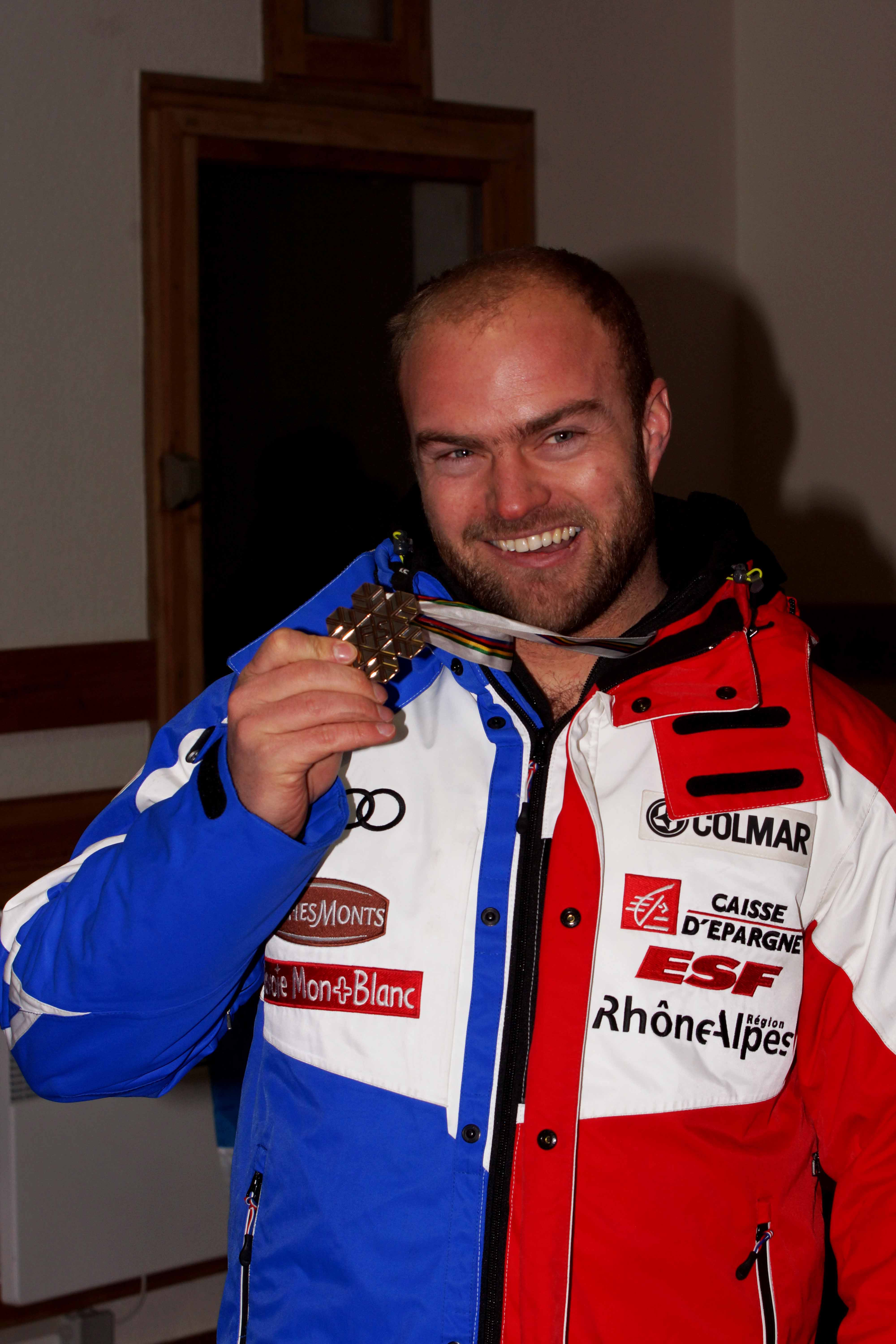
- David Poisson in February 2013

Personal information
- Born: 31 March 1982 Annecy, Haute-Savoie, France
- Died: 13 November 2017 (aged 35) Nakiska, Alberta, Canada
- Height: 172 cm (5 ft 8 in)
- Website: davidpoisson.com

Skiing career
- Sport: Alpine skiing
- Club: SC Peisey Vallandry
- Disciplines: Downhill, super-G, combined
- World Cup debut: 14 February 2004 (age 21)

Olympics
- Teams: 2 – (2010, 2014)
- Medals: 0

World Championships
- Teams: 4 – (2005, 2009, 2013, 2015)
- Medals: 1 (0 gold)

World Cup
- Seasons: 11 – (2005, 2007–2016)
- Wins: 0
- Podiums: 1
- Overall titles: 0 – (11th in 2010)
- Discipline titles: 0 – (5th in DH, 2013)
Medal record
Men's alpine skiing
Representing France
World Championships
Bronze medal – third place	2013 Schladming	Downhill

David Poisson (31 March 1982 – 13 November 2017) was a French World Cup alpine ski racer, who specialized in the speed events. He made his World Cup debut in 2004. Poisson represented France at the 2010 Winter Olympics in Vancouver, where he placed 7th in the downhill. At the 2013 World Championships, Poisson made his first podium in top-level competition, taking bronze in the downhill. In 2015, Poisson took his only World Cup podium in a downhill in Santa Caterina, finishing third.

Poisson died in a crash during training in Canada, at Nakiska near Calgary, on 13 November 2017. He caught an edge, went through the safety netting, and struck a tree.

== World Cup results ==
=== Top ten finishes ===
- 1 podium – (1 DH)

Season	Date	Location	Discipline	Place
2008	29 Feb 2008	Kvitfjell, Norway	Downhill	10th
2009	24 Jan 2009	Kitzbühel, Austria	Downhill	9th
2010	5 Dec 2009	Beaver Creek, USA	Downhill	8th
2010	29 Dec 2009	Bormio, Italy	Downhill	4th
2012	3 Mar 2012	Kvitfjell, Norway	Downhill	6th
2013	19 Jan 2013	Wengen, Switzerland	Downhill	9th
2013	26 Jan 2013	Kitzbühel, Austria	Downhill	4th
2015	21 Feb 2015	Saalbach, Austria	Downhill	5th
2016	29 Dec 2015	Santa Caterina, Italy	Downhill	3rd
2016	16 Jan 2016	Wengen, Switzerland	Downhill	6th
2016	23 Jan 2016	Kitzbühel, Austria	Downhill	9th

=== Season standings ===
Season	Age	Overall	Slalom	Giant slalom	Super-G	Downhill	Combined
2004	21	140	—	—	—	54	–
2005	22	98	—	—	38	41	–
2006	23						
2007	24	143	—	—	–	56	51
2008	25	72	—	–	38	24	–
2009	26	74	—	–	–	24	–
2010	27	66	—	–	–	20	–
2011	28	147	—	–	–	51	–
2012	29	75	—	–	–	27	–
2013	30	50	—	–	43	25	–
2014	31	82	—	–	51	31	–
2015	32	76	—	–	–	26	–
2016	33	56	—	—	–	19	—
2017	34	107	—	—	47	38	—

== World Championship results ==
Year	Age	Slalom	Giant slalom	Super-G	Downhill	Combined
2005	22	—	—	9	9	—
2007	24	—	—	—	—	—
2009	26	—	—	34	DNF	—
2011	28	—	—	—	—	—
2013	30	—	—	—	3	—
2015	32	—	—	—	14	—

== Olympic results ==
Year	Age	Slalom	Giant slalom	Super-G	Downhill	Combined
2010	27	—	—	DNF1	7	—
2014	31	—	—	17	16	—
