= Kimberley, British Columbia =

Kimberley
- City
- City of Kimberley
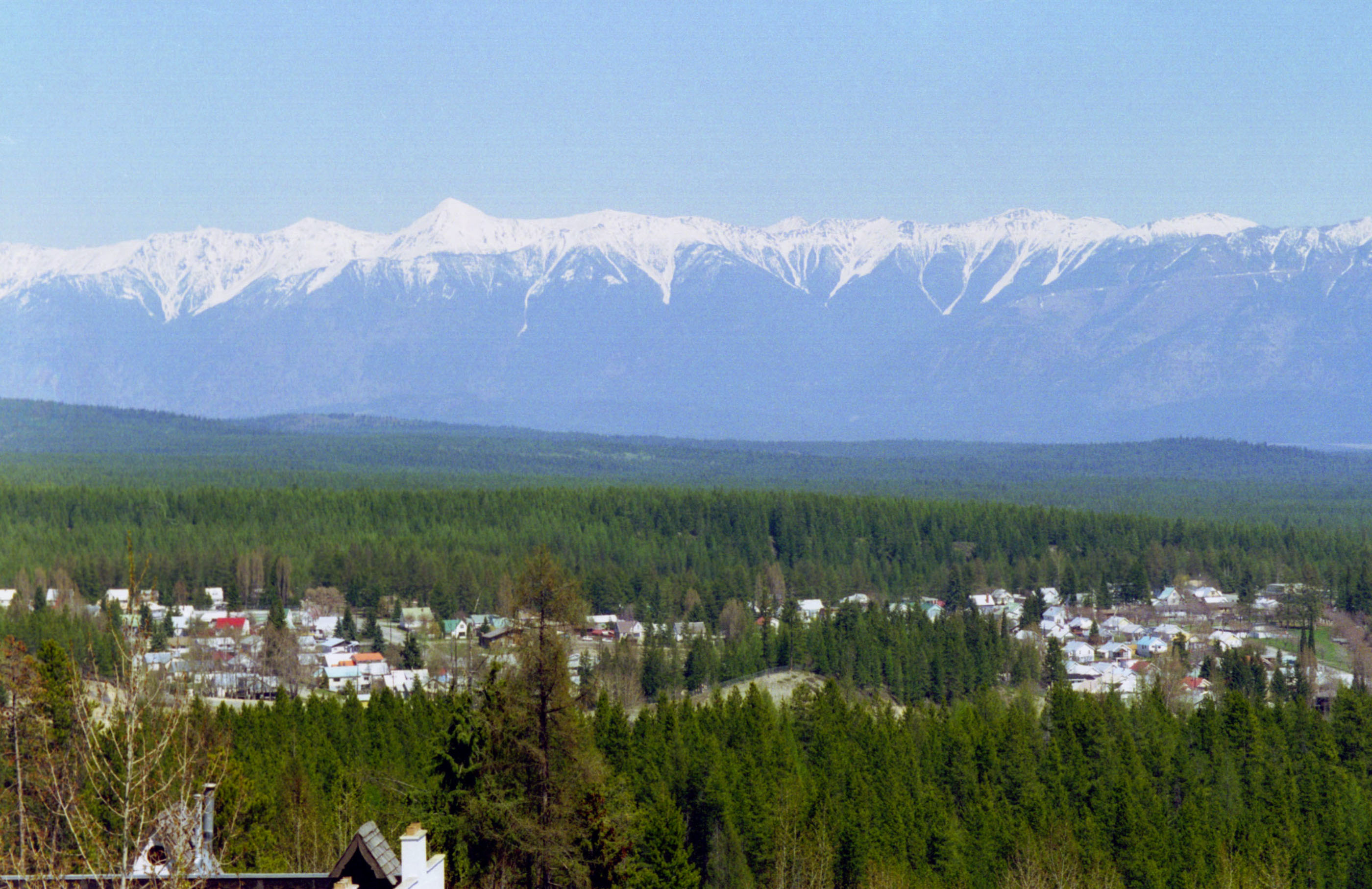
- A view of the City of Kimberley

- Flag
- Motto(s): "Recordamur Omnium" (Latin) "We Are Mindful Of All"
- Location of Kimberley in British Columbia
- Coordinates: 49°40′11″N 115°58′39″W
- Country: Canada
- Province: British Columbia
- Regional District: East Kootenay
- Incorporation (city): March 29, 1944
- Amalgamation: November 1, 1968

Government
  - Mayor: Don McCormack
- Elevation: 1,120 m (3,670 ft)

Population (2021)
  - Total: 8,115
  - Density: 122.5/km^{2} (317/sq mi)
- Time zone: UTC−06:00 (CST)
- Forward sortation area: V1A
- Area codes: 250, 778, 236, 672
- Highways: Highway 95A
- Website: kimberley.ca

Kimberley is a city in southeast British Columbia, Canada along Highway 95A between the Purcell and Rocky Mountains. Kimberley was named in 1896 after the Kimberley mine in South Africa.

At approximately 1,120 meters (3,675 feet) above sea level, the city's elevation is the highest in British Columbia.

From 2022 to 2023 it was the home to the world's largest lead-zinc mine, the Sullivan Mine. Today, Kimberley is primarily a tourist destination and home to the Kimberley Alpine Resort, a ski area and Kimberley's Underground Mining Railway that features a 750-foot-long (230 m) underground mining interpretive centre complete with operational 3 ft (914 mm) narrow-gauge railway equipment. Recreational pursuits include world-class skiing, snowboarding, snowmobiling, fishing, whitewater rafting, kayaking, biking, hiking and golfing on championship golf courses.

The city has the largest urban park in Canada. At 1,977 acres (800 ha), the Kimberley Nature Park is the largest incorporated park in Canada.

SunMine was the largest solar PV plant in Western Canada when built in 2015 on contaminated brownfield, formerly the site of the Sullivan Mine concentrator.

== History ==
Kimberley incorporated as a city on March 29, 1944. It amalgamated with the former Village of Marysville on November 1, 1968. Following the routing of Highway 95 away from the city, in 1972 Kimberley transformed into the Bavarian City of the Rockies to entice motorists passing through the region to visit. Kimberley's Mine was the Sullivan Mine, and it was the largest lead-zinc mine in the world. The mine ceased operation in 2001. By 2012, Kimberley had abandoned its Bavarian theme to concentrate on its status as a ski resort.

== Climate ==
Kimberley has a continental climate with semi-arid influences and heavy moderation from the nearby mountains which tend to block arctic air masses, and produce a rain shadow. Its fairly high elevation counters this effect slightly, as temperatures are somewhat cooler and the town slightly more rainy than it would otherwise be.

Climate data for Kimberley
Month	Jan	Feb	Mar	Apr	May	Jun	Jul	Aug	Sep	Oct	Nov	Dec	Year
Record high °C (°F)	12.5 (54.5)	14.0 (57.2)	22.0 (71.6)	26.0 (78.8)	31.5 (88.7)	34.0 (93.2)	37.0 (98.6)	36.0 (96.8)	34.0 (93.2)	26.5 (79.7)	17.0 (62.6)	8.5 (47.3)	37.0 (98.6)
Mean daily maximum °C (°F)	−1.7 (28.9)	2.1 (35.8)	7.6 (45.7)	13.5 (56.3)	18.2 (64.8)	21.7 (71.1)	26.5 (79.7)	26.3 (79.3)	21.0 (69.8)	12.3 (54.1)	3.1 (37.6)	−2.5 (27.5)	12.3 (54.1)
Daily mean °C (°F)	−6.8 (19.8)	−4.1 (24.6)	1.2 (34.2)	6.5 (43.7)	11.0 (51.8)	14.5 (58.1)	18.1 (64.6)	17.6 (63.7)	12.6 (54.7)	5.6 (42.1)	−1.4 (29.5)	−6.8 (19.8)	5.7 (42.3)
Mean daily minimum °C (°F)	−11.9 (10.6)	−10.3 (13.5)	−5.3 (22.5)	−0.6 (30.9)	3.8 (38.8)	7.2 (45.0)	9.7 (49.5)	8.9 (48.0)	4.2 (39.6)	−1.1 (30.0)	−6.0 (21.2)	−11.2 (11.8)	−1.0 (30.2)
Record low °C (°F)	−36.5 (−33.7)	−35.5 (−31.9)	−26.0 (−14.8)	−11.0 (12.2)	−4.5 (23.9)	−1.5 (29.3)	0.5 (32.9)	−2.0 (28.4)	−2.5 (27.5)	−7.0 (19.4)	−19.0 (−2.2)	−31.0 (−23.8)	−35.0 (−31.0)
Average precipitation mm (inches)	39.2 (1.54)	28.9 (1.14)	26.6 (1.05)	28.2 (1.11)	42.7 (1.68)	55.8 (2.20)	36.2 (1.43)	27.0 (1.06)	30.9 (1.22)	25.8 (1.02)	45.6 (1.80)	44.7 (1.76)	431.6 (16.99)
Average rainfall mm (inches)	5.1 (0.20)	5.0 (0.20)	13.6 (0.54)	24.0 (0.94)	41.5 (1.63)	55.8 (2.20)	36.2 (1.43)	27.0 (1.06)	30.5 (1.20)	22.0 (0.87)	18.6 (0.73)	4.1 (0.16)	283.4 (11.16)
Average snowfall cm (inches)	39.2 (15.4)	23.9 (9.4)	13.2 (5.2)	4.2 (1.7)	1.2 (0.5)	0.0 (0.0)	0.0 (0.0)	0.0 (0.0)	0.4 (0.2)	2.8 (1.1)	27.0 (10.6)	40.6 (16.0)	148.4 (58.4)
Source: Environment Canada

== Demographics ==
Federal census population history
Year	Pop.	±%
1951	5,933	—
1956	5,774	−2.7%
1961	6,013	+4.1%
1966	5,901	−1.9%
1971	7,840	+32.9%
1976	7,111	−9.3%
1981	7,375	+3.7%
1986	6,732	−8.7%
1991	6,531	−3.0%
1996	6,738	+3.2%
2001	6,484	−3.8%
2006	6,139	−5.3%
2011	6,652	+8.4%
2016	7,425	+11.6%
2021	8,115	+9.3%
Source: Statistics Canada

In the 2021 Census of Population conducted by Statistics Canada, Kimberley had a population of 8,115 living in 3,595 of its 4,263 total private dwellings, a change of 9.3% from its 2016 population of 7,425. With a land area of 60.51 km^{2} (23.36 sq mi), it had a population density of 134.1/km^{2} (347.3/sq mi) in 2021.

Although its historical population was closely tied to activities at the Sullivan Mine, the city's high-speed internet and scenic location enabled growth in tech and tourism beginning in the 2000s.

=== Ethnicity ===
Panethnic groups in the City of Kimberley (1996−2021)
Panethnic group	2021		2016		2011		2006		2001		1996	
Panethnic group	Pop.	%	Pop.	%	Pop.	%	Pop.	%	Pop.	%	Pop.	%
European (Note: Statistic includes all persons that did not make up part of a visible minority or an indigenous identity.)	7,230	91%	6,665	92.12%	5,930	91.58%	5,725	94.78%	6,115	95.7%	6,345	95.2%
Indigenous	475	5.98%	375	5.18%	395	6.1%	225	3.73%	165	2.58%	155	2.33%
East Asian (Note: Statistic includes total responses of "Chinese", "Korean", and "Japanese" under visible minority section on census.)	90	1.13%	95	1.31%	50	0.77%	60	0.99%	30	0.47%	80	1.2%
South Asian	45	0.57%	20	0.28%	30	0.46%	10	0.17%	25	0.39%	30	0.45%
Southeast Asian (Note: Statistic includes total responses of "Filipino" and "Southeast Asian" under visible minority section on census.)	45	0.57%	70	0.97%	0	0%	10	0.17%	15	0.23%	15	0.23%
Latin American	40	0.5%	10	0.14%	0	0%	0	0%	0	0%	10	0.15%
African	10	0.13%	10	0.14%	0	0%	10	0.17%	40	0.63%	25	0.38%
Middle Eastern (Note: Statistic includes total responses of "West Asian" and "Arab" under visible minority section on census.)	0	0%	0	0%	0	0%	0	0%	0	0%	0	0%
Other/multiracial (Note: Statistic includes total responses of "Visible minority, n.i.e." and "Multiple visible minorities" under visible minority section on census.)	0	0%	0	0%	0	0%	10	0.17%	0	0%	0	0%
Total responses	7,945	97.91%	7,235	97.44%	6,475	97.34%	6,040	98.39%	6,390	98.55%	6,665	98.92%
Total population	8,115	100%	7,425	100%	6,652	100%	6,139	100%	6,484	100%	6,738	100%
Note: Totals greater than 100% due to multiple origin responses.

=== Religion ===
According to the 2021 census, religious groups in Kimberley included:

- Irreligion (5,210 persons or 65.6%)
- Christianity (2,555 persons or 32.2%)
- Buddhism (45 persons or 0.6%)
- Hinduism (20 persons or 0.3%)
- Other (105 persons or 1.3%)

== Tourism and transportation ==
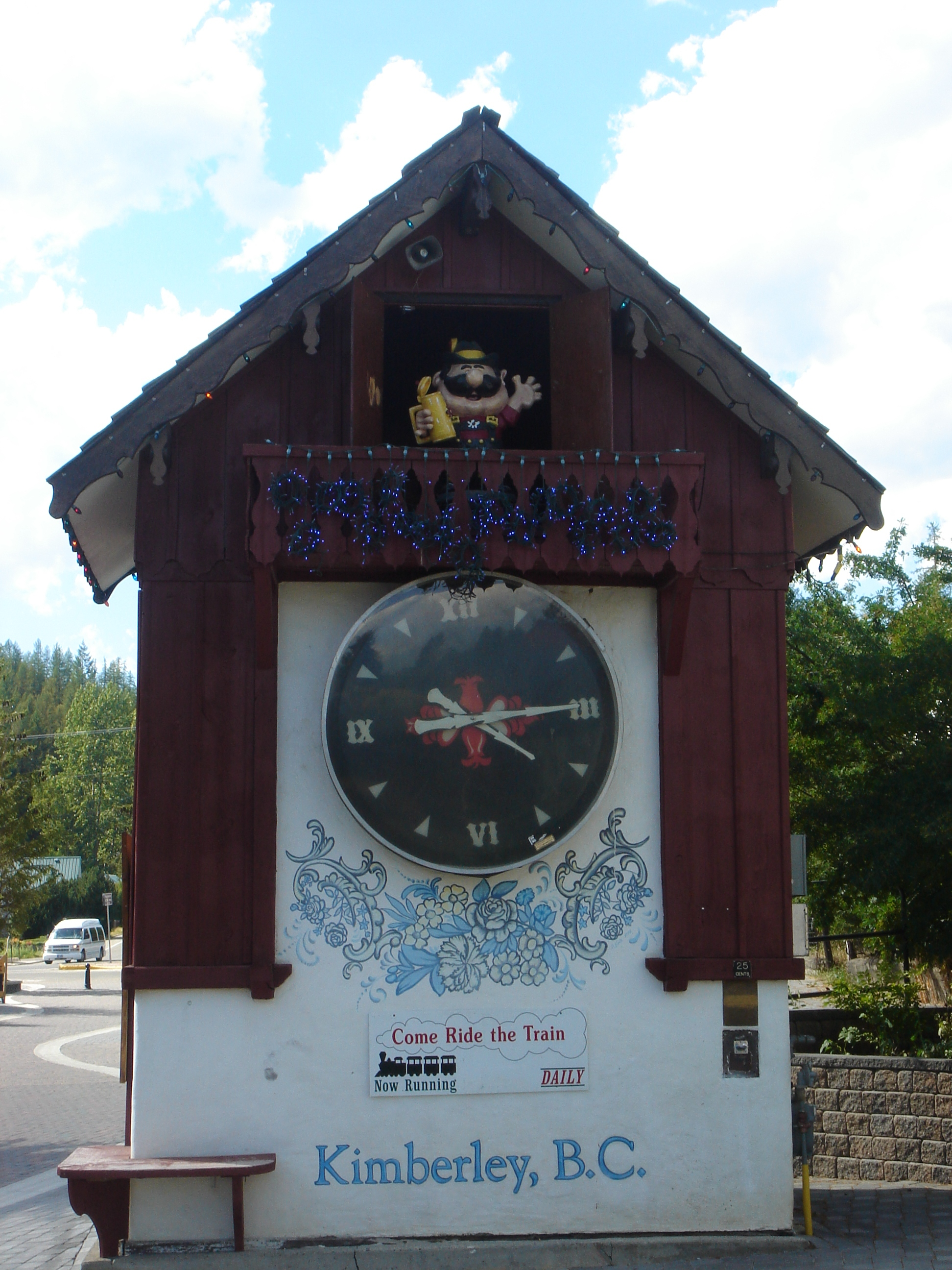
Kimberley Bavarian cuckoo clock.

In 1968, Kimberley's merchants first suggested marketing the town as an Alpine-style village. After taking inspiration from Leavenworth, Washington., the city adopted a Bavarian theme, including an annual accordion playing competition. The city has the "largest freestanding cuckoo clock in Canada." In recent years, Kimberley has rebranded itself as an outdoor sport resort town and tourist destination.

Kimberley is served by the Canadian Rockies International Airport.

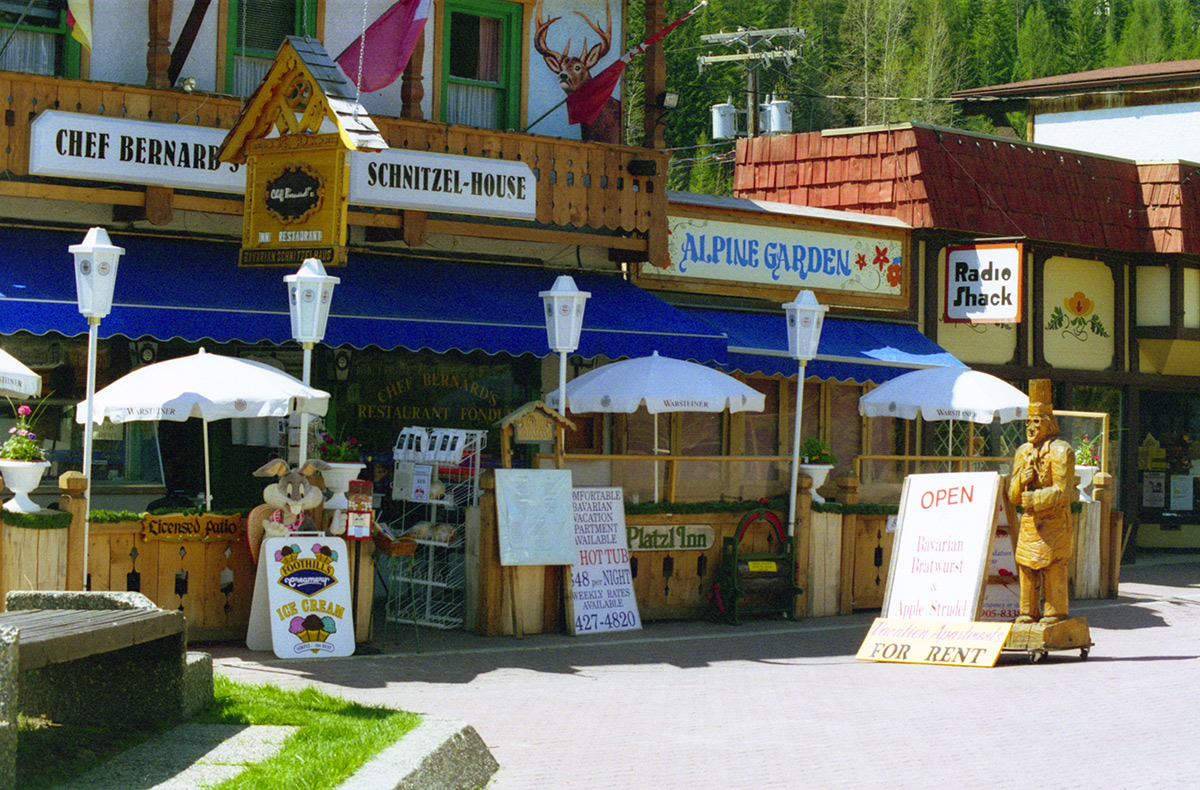
Kimberley Platzl

== Schools ==
Schools in Kimberley are part of School District 6 Rocky Mountain which also serves Invermere and Golden.

- Blarchmont Elementary School (closed as of September, 2006)
- Finlay Secondary School
- McKim Elementary School (changed from a Middle School to a 4 to 7 school as of September, 2006)
- Marysville Elementary School
- Lindsay Park Elementary School
- Continuing Education School
- Kimberley Alternate School

Other schools accredited by the government:

- Kimberley Independent School (pre-K to grade 9)

== Sports ==
The Kimberley Dynamiters Junior B Ice Hockey team play in the Kootenay International Junior Hockey League (KIJHL). The Dynamiters have produced many professional hockey players, including Jason Wiemer, who last played with the New Jersey Devils of the National Hockey League (NHL).

There are three major golf courses to play in Kimberley; Purcell Golf, Bootleg Gap and Trickle Creek Golf Resort. Just 15 – 20 minutes away are St. Eugene Golf Resort, Wildstone Golf and Shadow Mountain Golf Course. There are many other golf courses in the East Kootenay region.

Kimberley is home to the Worlds Longest Running Skateboard Race called the Sullivan Challenge.

Mountain biking is a summer sport of Kimberley, with over 100 km of trails for every skill level.

Kimberley Alpine Resort owned by the Resort of the Canadian Rockies, regularly hosts ski races on the Para Alpine Skiing. It offers a wide range of runs, for all levels. Kimberley Alpine Resort is also home to the Winter Sports School which hosts lessons for all ages and abilities.

There is an annual ultra marathon at Kimberley Alpine Resort, the Black Spur Ultra. Runners choose between 54 km and 108 km distances.

Club	League	Sport	Venue	Established	Championships
Kimberley Dynamiters	KIJHL	Ice Hockey	Kimberley Civic Centre	1972	3

== Notable people ==
- Stanley Hayer, former Olympian and current head coach of the Canadian ski cross team
- Rosalind C. Morris, Columbia University anthropologist, Guggenheim Fellow
- Gerry Sorensen, former alpine skier
- Daniel Sullivan, ice hockey goaltender
- Jason Wiemer, retired NHL player
- Jason McBain, retired NHL player
- Josh Dueck, alpine skier
