= School District 6 Rocky Mountain =

School board in British Columbia

- School District 6 Rocky Mountain logo

Location
- Invermere Golden, Invermere, Kimberley, Windermere, Canal Flats, Field, Radium Hot Springs, Edgewater in Kootenays Canada
- Coordinates: 50.5107°N 116.0281°W

District information
- Superintendent: Mr. Aaron Callaghan
- Schools: 18
- Budget: CA$50.0 million

Students and staff
- Students: 3992
- Faculty: 731

Other information
- Website: www.sd6.bc.ca

School District 6 Rocky Mountain is a school district in South Eastern British Columbia. This includes the major centres of Kimberley, Invermere and Golden.

== History ==
School District 6 Rocky Mountain was formed in 1996 by the amalgamation of School District 3 (Kimberley), School District 4 (Windermere) and School District 18 (Golden).

== Schools ==
School	Location	Grades
RM Online Learning/Continuing Education	Invermere	K-Adult
Edgewater Elementary School	Edgewater	K-7
Golden Alternate School	Golden	10-12
Alexander Park Elementary School	Golden	K-3
Windermere Elementary School	Windermere	K-7
Golden Secondary School	Golden	8-12
Selkirk Secondary School	Kimberley	8-12
Open Doors Alternate School	Invermere	10-12
Nicholson Elementary School	Golden	K-7
McKim Middle School	Kimberley	4-7
Marysville Elementary School	Kimberley	K-3
Martin Morigeau Elementary School	Canal Flats	K-7
Lindsay Park Elementary School	Kimberley	K-3
Lady Grey Elementary School	Golden	4-7
Kimberley Alternate School	Kimberley	10-12
Eileen Madson Primary School	Invermere	K-3
J Alfred Laird Elementary School	Invermere	4-7
David Thompson Secondary	Invermere	8-12

== Trustees ==
Name	Zone	
Amber Byklum	Windermere	Chairperson
Ryan Stimming	Windermere	Trustee
Jane Thurgood Sagal	Windermere	Trustee
Jane Fearing	Golden	Trustee
Scott King	Golden	Trustee
Rhonda Smith	Golden	Trustee
Betty-Lou Barrett	Kimberley	Trustee
Ron McRae	Kimberley	Vice Chairperson
Darryl Oakley	Kimberley	Trustee

== See also ==
- List of school districts in British Columbia
