= Mount 7 =

Mountain in British Columbia, Canada

Coordinates: 51.255°N 116.853°W

Mount 7 is a mountain in the Canadian Rockies just southeast of Golden, British Columbia. It is named for the characteristic "7" formation visible in the snow near its peak, visible for several weeks around mid-June due to the melting pattern of snow and ice at its cap.
