= David Thompson Secondary School (Invermere) =

Location
- 1535 14th St; Invermere, British Columbia, V0A 1K4; Canada; 50.50205°N 116.04104°W

Information
- School type: Public, high school
- School board: School District 6 Rocky Mountain
- Superintendent: Aaron Callaghan
- School number: 604015
- Principal: Heather English
- Staff: 47
- Grades: 8-12
- Enrollment: 483 (2025/2026)
- Team name: Lakers
- Last updated: October 3, 2026

David Thompson Secondary School, located in Invermere, British Columbia, serves grades 8-12 for students from as far south as Canal Flats to as far north as Spillimacheen. There are four schools that feed DTSS: JA Laird Elementary, Windermere Elementary, Edgewater Elementary, and Martin Morigeau Elementary.

DTSS is currently on a combined semester, term and linear system. The schedule has five ~65-minute classes per day which rotate based on the day of the week. The Friday schedule has only four classes of ~65 minutes.

The school has a student population of approximately 500 students. There are roughly 30 teachers, 3 administrators, and several support staff at David Thompson Secondary.

== Notable alumni ==
- Christine Keshen - Curler and olympic bronze medalist
- Wade Dubielewicz - Former professional ice hockey player
