= Selkirk Secondary School =

Location
- 405 Halpin St; Kimberley, British Columbia, V1A 2H1; Canada; 49.6874°N 115.9798°W

Information
- School type: Public, high school
- School board: School District 6 Rocky Mountain
- Superintendent: Aaron Callaghan
- School number: 603008
- Principal: Clint Dolgopol
- Staff: 26
- Grades: 8-12
- Enrollment: 578 (2025/2026)
- Colours: Blue, Green, and Yellow
- Team name: Storm
- Website: www.sd6.bc.ca/school/sss/
- Last updated: October 3, 2026

Selkirk Secondary School is a public high school in Kimberley, British Columbia, Canada. It is a part of School District 6 Rocky Mountain.

== Not Notable students ==
- Stanley Hayer
- Gerry Sorensen
