= Dogtooth Range =

Mountain range in British Columbia, Canada

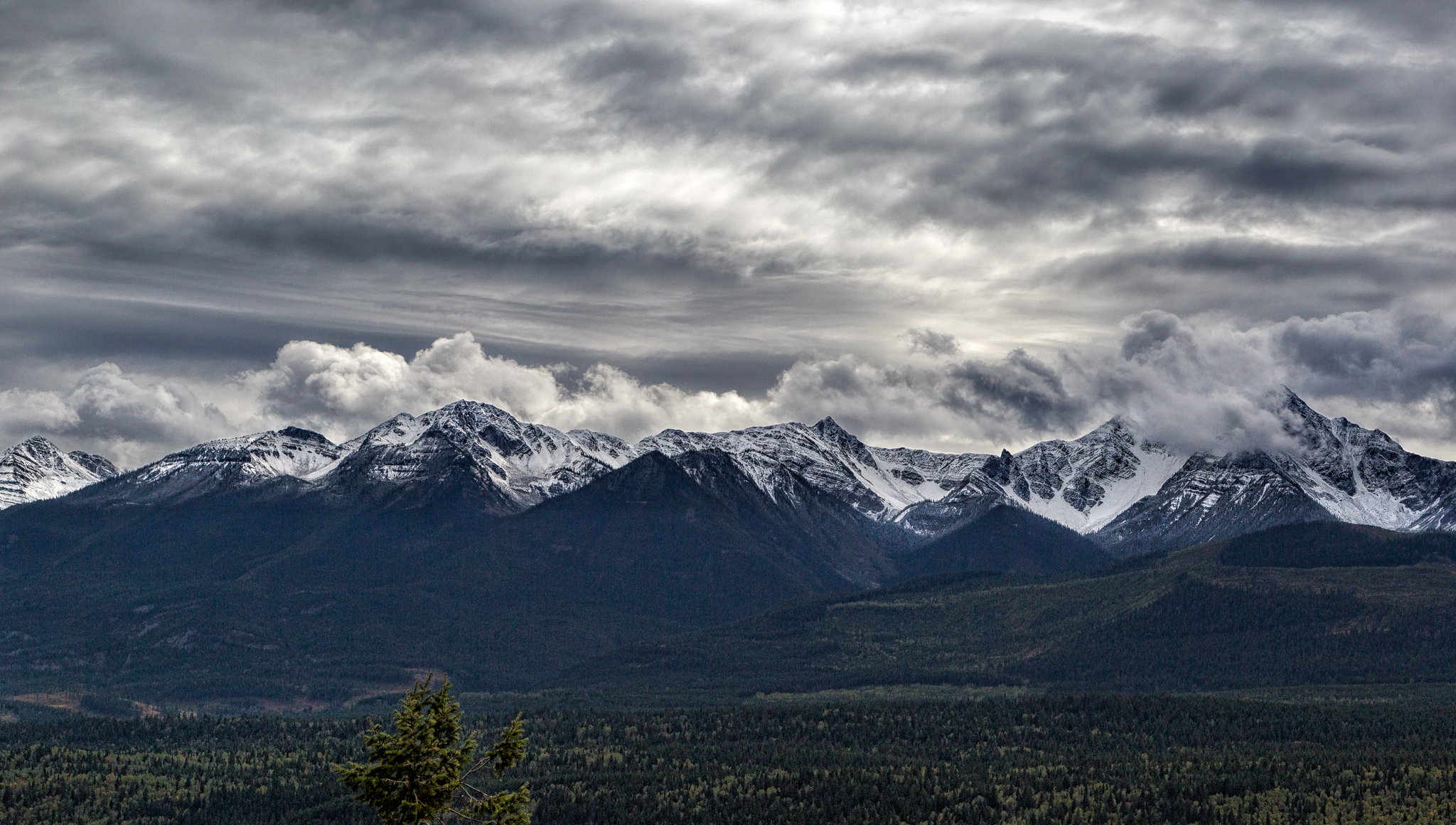
- Ridges and peaks of the Dogtooth Range west of Golden, British Columbia

Highest point
- Peak: Dogtooth Peak (2838 m)
- Coordinates: 51.2°N 116.933°W

Dimensions
- Area: 1,458 km^{2} (563 mi^{2})

Geography
- Location: British Columbia, Canada
- Parent range: Purcell Mountains

The Dogtooth Range is a mountain range in southeastern British Columbia, Canada. It is a sub-range of the Purcell Mountains, which are part of the larger Columbia Mountains. The western portion of the range lies within Glacier National Park. It is bounded by the Beaver River to the west, the Spillmacheen River to the south, and the Columbia River to the north and east. The range was named by railway surveyor James J. McArthur in 1892; previous maps called the range the "Prairie Hills".

The highest point in the range is Dogtooth Peak at 2,838 metres (9,311 ft). Other major peaks include Moonraker, Little Sir Donald, and Dawn Mountain. Some mountains in the range have names from breeds of canines, including Rottweiler, Retriever, Akita, Malamute, Foxhound, and Great Dane. The Kicking Horse Resort is located on the eastern edge of the range, near the town of Golden.
