= Klahowya (sternwheeler) =

Early 20th-century steamboat operating on the Columbia River

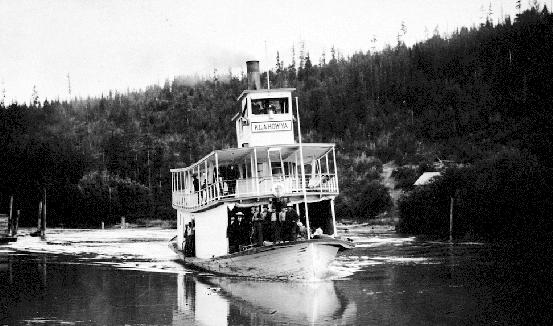
- Klahowya on the Columbia River ca 1910

History

Canada
- Name: Klahowya (CAN #126946)
- Owner: Columbia River Lumber Company
- Port of registry: Golden, BC
- Route: Inland British Columbia on Columbia River
- Builder: Frank P. Armstrong or George Rury
- Launched: 1910 at Golden, BC
- In service: 1910
- Out of service: 1915
- Fate: Removed from service

General characteristics
- Type: inland passenger/freighter
- Tonnage: 175 gross tons; 111 registered tons
- Length: 92 ft (28 m)
- Beam: 19 ft (6 m)
- Depth: 3.5 ft (1 m) depth of hold
- Installed power: twin steam engines, horizontally mounted, 7" bore by 42" stroke, 3 nominal horsepower, manufactured by Albion Iron Works
- Propulsion: sternwheel
- Notes: Engines from steamer Isabella McCormack

Klahowya was a sternwheel steamer that operated in British Columbia on the Columbia River from 1910 to 1915. The name "Klahowya" is the standard greeting in the Chinook Jargon.

== Design and construction ==
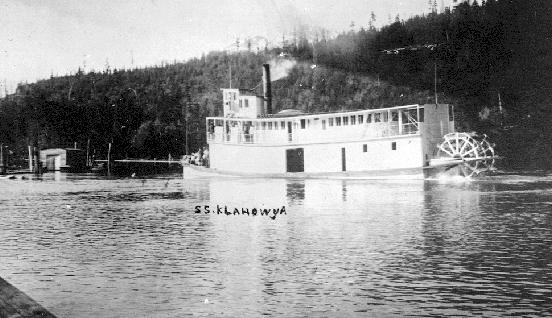
Klahowya departing Golden, BC, ca 1911

Klahowya was built at Golden, BC.Klahowya's engines came from Isabella McCormack which had been converted into a houseboat. Klahowya was built by Capt. Frank P. Armstrong (another source gives George Rury as the builder), with the capacity to carry 100 passengers. Whether it was done by Armstrong or Rury, the Klahowya was built in an unusual way. When the Columbia River was frozen, the vessel was constructed on a set of shipways built directly on top of the ice. When the boat was finished, the builder simply cut around the outline of the vessel in the ice, and the boat settled into the water.

Two sources state Klahowya was built for the Columbia River Lumber Company, while another source states Klahowya was intended for the increasing tourist trade in the Golden region. Multiple use steamboats were common, and use for lumbering would not have been necessarily inconsistent with tourist applications.

== Operations ==
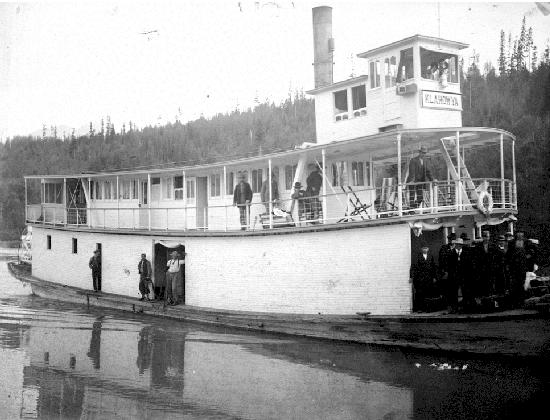
Klahowya on Columbia River

Klahowya operated on the Columbia River from Golden to Columbia Lake. The period of reported operations was brief, from 1910 to 1915. It is possible that Canada's participation in World War I starting in 1914 helped shorten Klahowya's career. A number of steamboats in other areas of inland British Columbia had been built to cater to tourism, which was badly affected by war. Mobilization of men also depressed local businesses such as lumbering, which depended upon their labor. Captain Armstrong himself went overseas during World War I to supervise steamboat operations in war zones in the Middle East.

== Removal from service ==
Klahowya is reported to have been withdrawn from service in 1915.
