= Kimberley Alpine Resort =

Ski resort in British Columbia, Canada

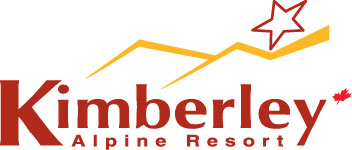

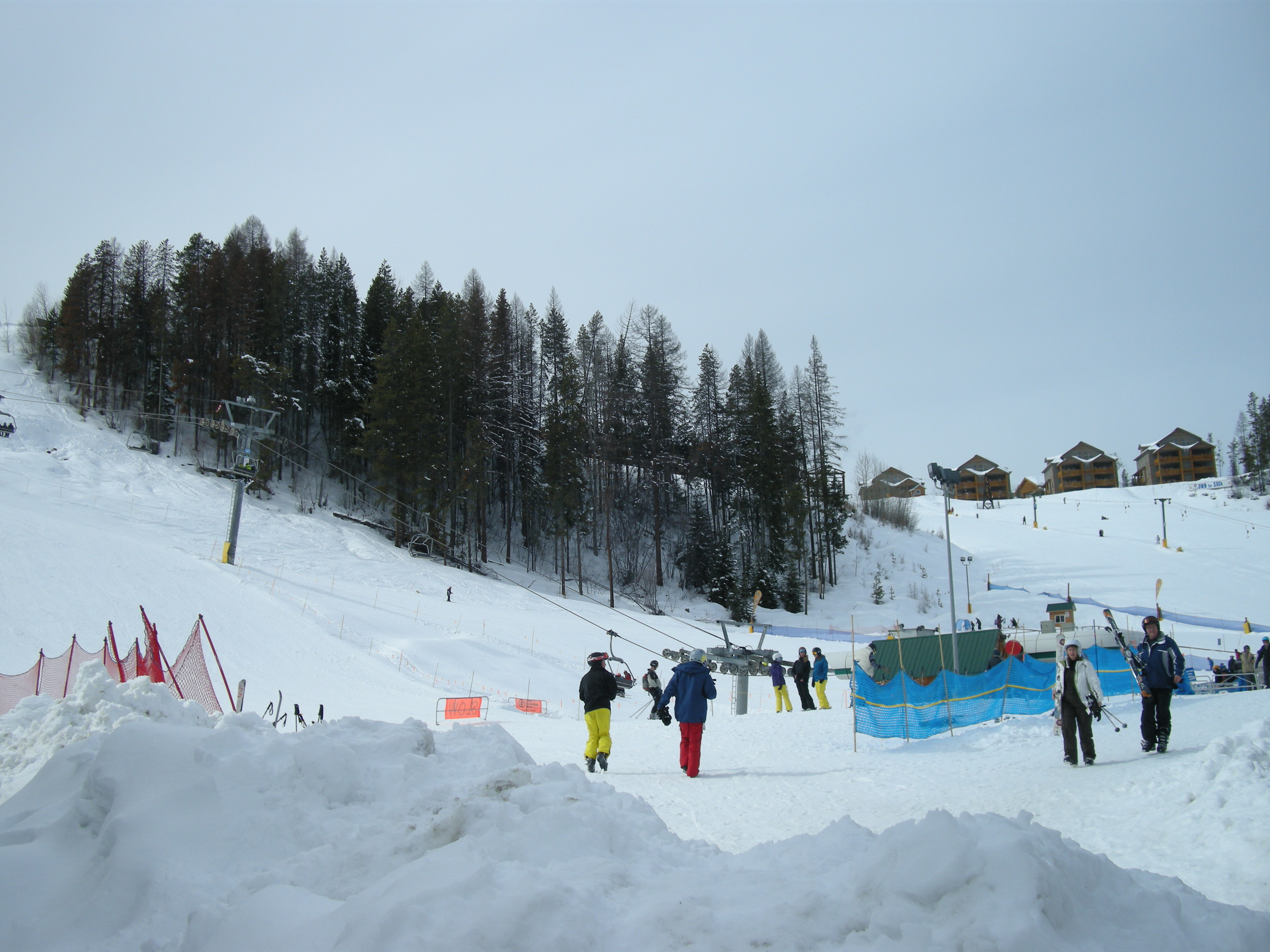
- Resort's base in 2012

- Location within British Columbia Location within Canada
- Location: British Columbia, Canada
- Nearest city: Kimberley (adjacent); Cranbrook – 30 km (19 mi)
- Coordinates: 49.685°N 116.014°W
- Status: Operating
- Owner: Resorts of the Canadian Rockies
- Vertical: 751 m (2,464 ft)
- Top elevation: 1,982 m (6,503 ft)
- Base elevation: 1,231 m (4,039 ft)
- Skiable area: 7.28 km^{2} (1,800 acres)
- Trails: 80
- Longest run: 6.4 km (4.0 mi)
- Lift system: 5 total (3 chairlifts, 1 T-bar, 1 magic carpet)
- Lift capacity: 6,452 per hour
- Terrain parks: Yes
- Snowfall: 400 cm (160 in)
- Snowmaking: Yes, 10%
- Night skiing: Yes
- Website: skikimberley.com

Kimberley Alpine Resort is a ski resort in southwestern Canada, located in Kimberley, British Columbia.

In the Purcell Mountains on the northeast face of North Star Hill, Kimberley's vertical drop is 751 m (2,464 ft) with a summit elevation of 1,982 m (6,503 ft) above sea level. The ski season commonly starts in mid-December and runs until early April.

The resort maintains 80 runs (with 20% beginner, 42% intermediate, and 38% advanced trails) and five lifts: a high-speed quad chairlift (the North Star Express), a triple chair (the Easter), a double chair (the Tamarack), a T-bar (the Owl) and a magic carpet, leading to an hourly lift capacity of 6,452.

The ski area opened in 1948 as North Star with a 245-metre-long (800 ft) rope tow; a T-bar installed a decade later was over 1.8 km (1.1 mi) in length, vertically climbing 460 m (1,500 ft) in eleven minutes.

The ski resort is operated by Resorts of the Canadian Rockies

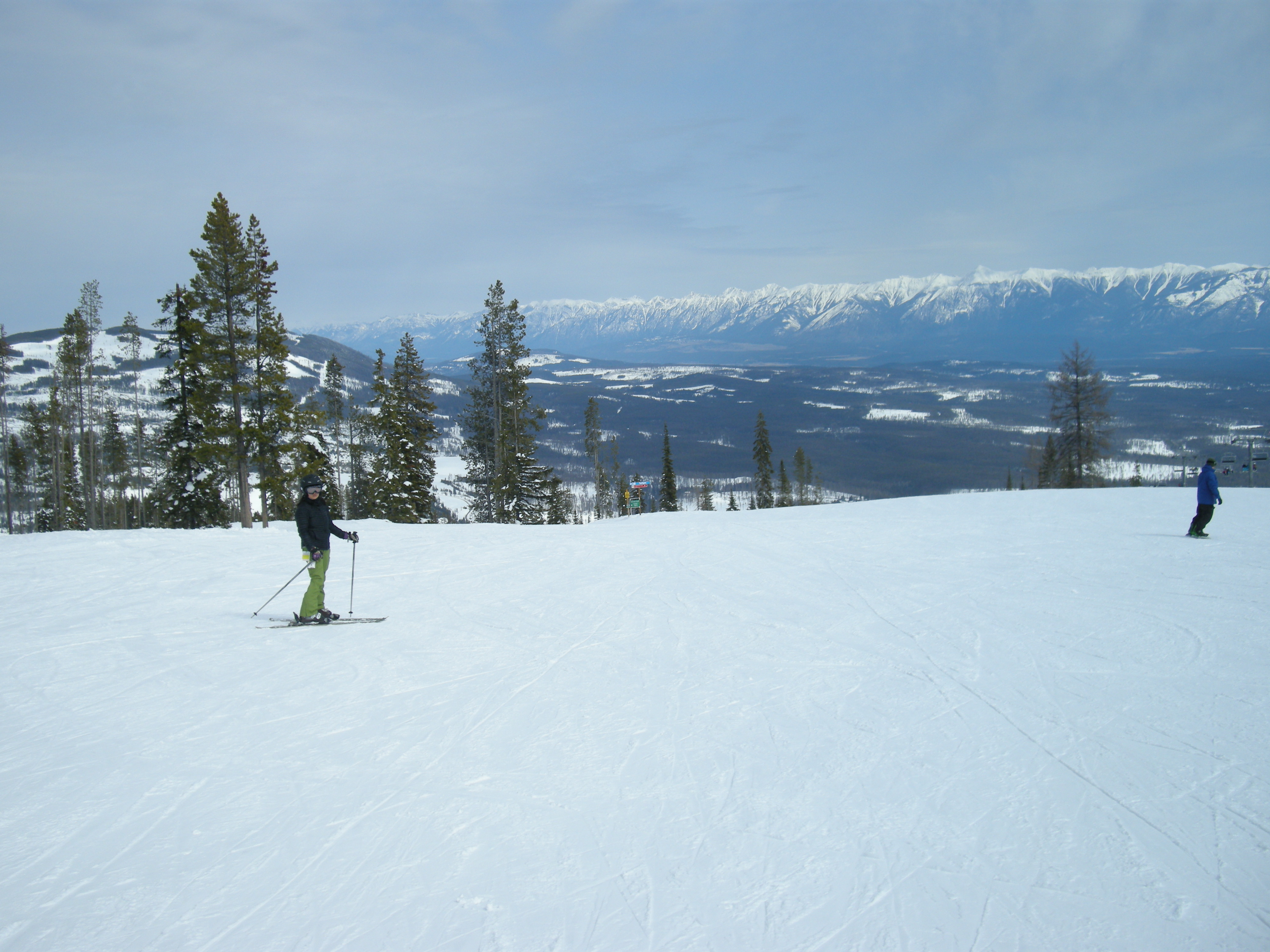
View from the top of the North Star Express chair lift
