= Mont-Sainte-Anne =

Ski resort in Quebec, Canada

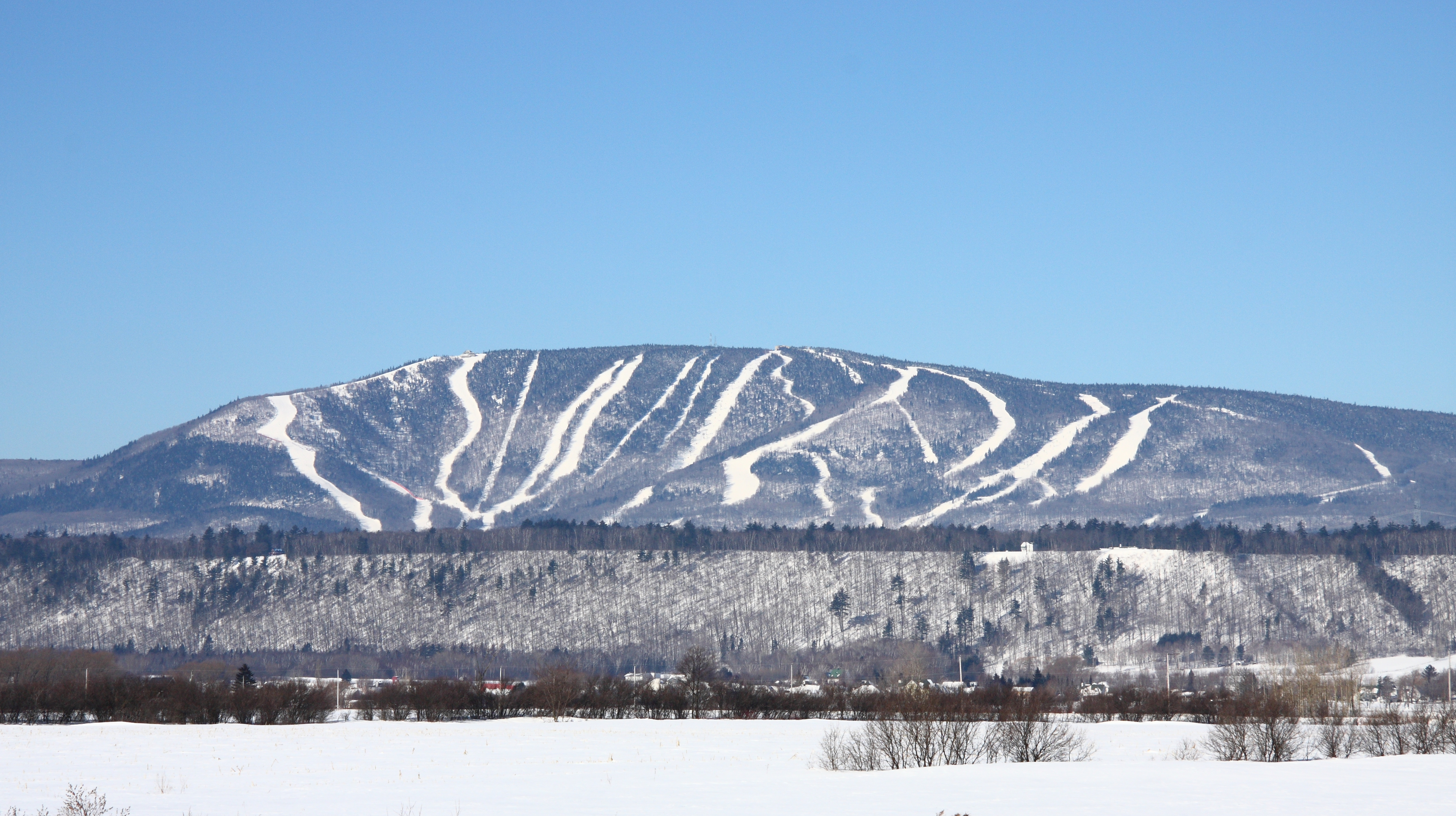

- Location in Quebec
- Location: Beaupré, Quebec, Canada
- Nearest city: Quebec City: 40 km (25 mi)
- Coordinates: 47.074°N 70.908°W
- Status: Operating
- Owner: Resorts of the Canadian Rockies
- Vertical: 625 m (2,051 ft)
- Top elevation: 800 m (2,625 ft)
- Base elevation: 175 m (574 ft)
- Skiable area: 182 ha (450 acres)
- Trails: 71: 23% - easy; 45% - difficult; 18% - more difficult; 15% - extreme
- Longest run: Le Chemin du Roy; 6.0 km (3.7 mi)
- Lift system: 1 high-speed gondola; 4 chairlifts; 4 surface lifts
- Lift capacity: 18,560 / hr
- Terrain parks: 3
- Snowfall: 475 cm (187 in)
- Snowmaking: Yes, 80%
- Night skiing: Yes, 17 runs
- Website: Mont-Sainte-Anne.com

Mont-Sainte-Anne is a ski resort in eastern Canada, located in the town of Beaupré, Quebec, about 40 km (25 mi) northeast of Quebec City. The mountain is part of the Laurentian mountain chain and has a summit elevation of 800 m (2,625 ft) above sea level with a vertical drop of 625 m (2,051 ft).

For day skiing, there are 71 available downhill ski trails covering 71 km (44 mi) the southern, northern and western sides of the mountain. For night skiing, there are 19 trails covering 15.2 km (9.4 mi) the southern part of the mountain only. It is the highest vertical for night skiing in Canada. The average natural snowfall at the summit is 475 cm (187 in).

== History ==
Ten trails and four lifts (including a gondola) were featured on the mountain inauguration day 60 years ago in 1966 on January 16. That year, the resort was already making its appearance on the world scene with the Du Maurier International, followed the next year by the first Canadian Winter Games.

Skiing at Mont-Sainte-Anne goes back to the 1940s though. Volunteers and skiers from Beaupré and Québec City, cut the first trail in the fall of 1943. Three years later, the first skiing competition was held, the competitors having to climb by foot up the mountain, bearing all their equipment. The only trail available was groomed "manually" by local volunteers using their skis while climbing up.

Since the mountain became privately owned in 1994 by Resorts of the Canadian Rockies, investments have been mostly aimed at cutting new gladed trails and improving the snowmaking system.

Numerous World Cup alpine races have been held at the mountain, last in December 1989. It has co-hosted the Junior World Championships three times; with Stoneham Mountain in 2000 and with Le Massif in 2006 and 2013.

In 2023, it hosted the Snowboard Cross FIS World Cup. The event, called Battle Royale, featured two competitions, an individual World Cup and a team World Cup.

== Cross-country skiing ==
Mont-Sainte-Anne's Cross-Country Ski Centre features 212 km (132 mi) of trails, including a 125 km (78 mi) network for skating stride, which makes it the largest cross-country ski centre in Canada, and the second most significant in North America (after Royal Gorge, California).

== Mountain Biking ==
The final round of 2023 UCI Mountain Bike World Cup was held at Mont Sainte Anne on the 8th of October.

The final round of the 2024 UCI Mountain Bike World Cup was held at Mont Sainte Anne from October 4th to 6th.

The final round of the 2025 UCI Mountain Bike World Cup was held at Mont Sainte Anne.

== Other activities ==
- Winter : Snowshoeing, dog sledding, paragliding, sleigh rides, ice skating, tubing, snowmobiling (nearby), spa, snowboarding, skiing.
- Summer: Campground, paragliding, hiking, golf, mountain biking.

== See also ==
- Stoneham Mountain Resort
- Le Massif
- List of ski areas and resorts in Canada
