= Stoneham Mountain Resort =

Ski resort in Quebec, Canada

Coordinates: 47°01′48″N 71°23′018″W

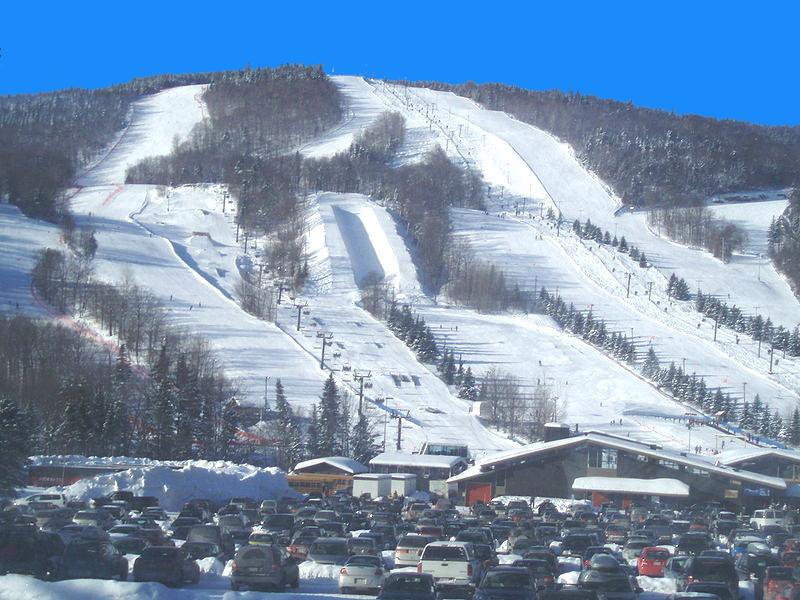
- Interactive map of Stoneham Mountain Resort
- Location: Stoneham-et-Tewkesbury, Quebec, Canada
- Nearest city: Quebec City
- Status: Operating
- Owner: Resorts of the Canadian Rockies
- Vertical: 345 m (1,132 ft)
- Top elevation: 593 m (1,946 ft)
- Base elevation: 248 m (814 ft)
- Skiable area: 333 hectares (820 acres)
- Trails: 42
- Longest run: 3.2 km (2.0 mi)
- Lift system: 4 quad lifts
- Lift capacity: 10 550 skiers/hr
- Terrain parks: Yes, 3
- Snowfall: 380 cm (150 in)
- Snowmaking: Yes, 86%
- Night skiing: Yes, 19 runs
- Website: Ski Stoneham

Stoneham Mountain Resort is a ski resort, located north of Quebec City, Quebec, Canada, in the municipality of Stoneham-et-Tewkesbury. It has a peak elevation of 593 metres (1,946 feet) above sea level and a vertical drop of 345 metres (1,132 feet). There are 41 trails covering 333 hectares (820 acres) over four mountains. Nineteen trails are available for night skiing, consisting in the largest network of night skiing in Canada. The resort is owned by Resorts of the Canadian Rockies. In 2017, the Poma double ski lift and Doppelmayr T-Bar were removed. A new ski lift was built to replace them, a Doppelmayr 4-CLF fixed-grip lift with loading conveyor. This is 4,700 feet long with a ride time of 8.5 minutes. It has a maximum capacity of 1900 persons per hour.

== Notable events ==
Since 2007, Stoneham Mountain resort has been the host of the Snowboard FIS World Cup Finals, held yearly in March. In January 2013, Stoneham hosted the FIS Snowboarding World Championships. In 1993, the mountain hosted a slalom event of the alpine skiing World Cup, won by one of the most dominant alpine ski racers in history, Alberto Tomba of Italy.

== See also ==
- Mont-Sainte-Anne
- Le Massif
- List of ski areas and resorts in Canada
