= Kicking Horse Resort =

Ski resort in British Columbia, Canada

Kicking Horse Mountain Resort
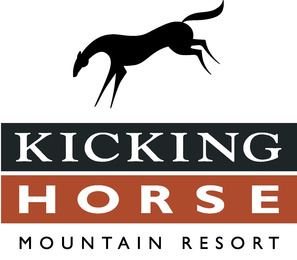

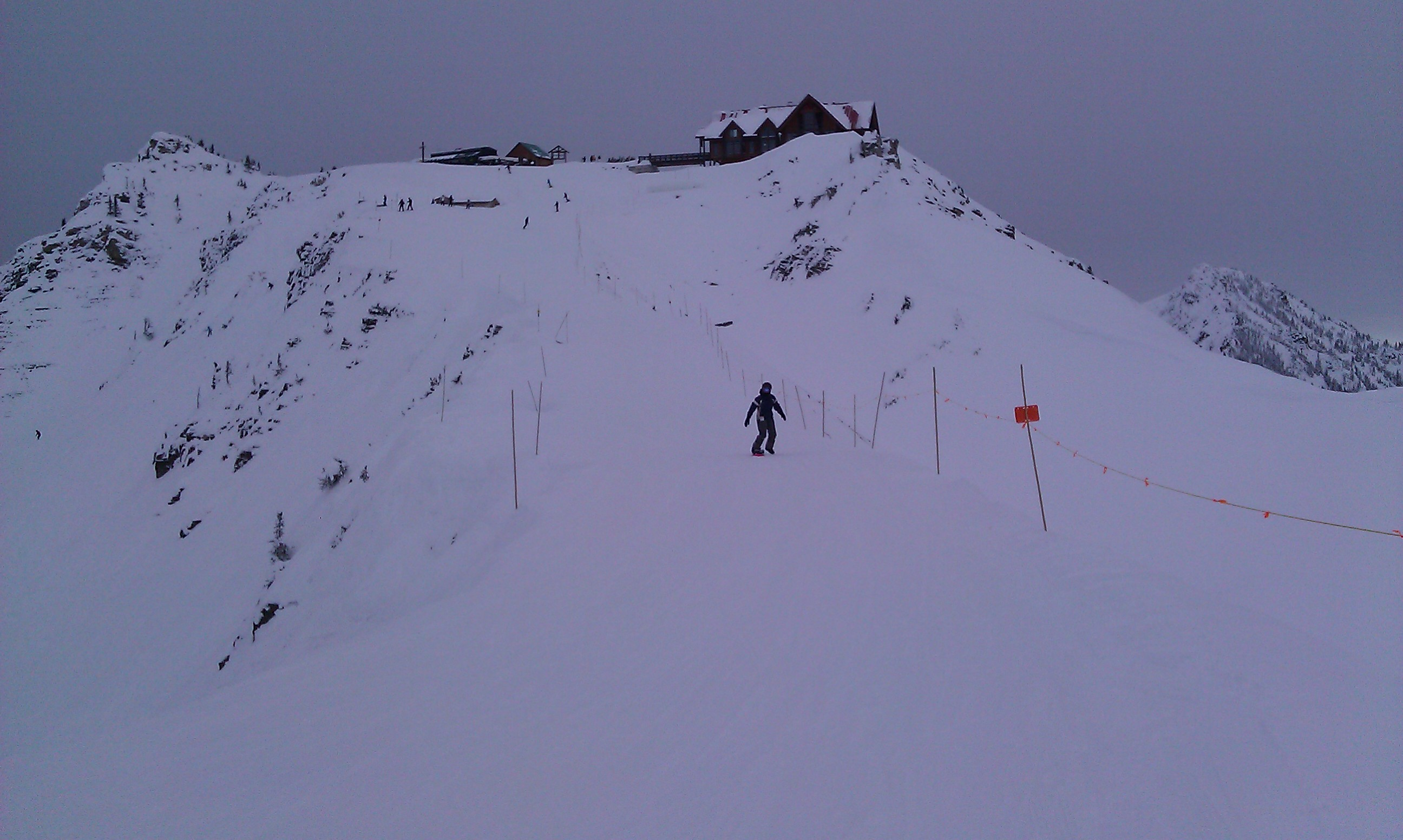
- Top of the gondola at Kicking Horse

- Location within British Columbia Location within Canada
- Location: British Columbia, Canada
- Nearest city: Golden
- Coordinates: 51°17′21″N 117°03′31″W
- Status: Operating
- Owner: Resorts of the Canadian Rockies
- Vertical: 1,315 m (4,314 ft)
- Top elevation: 2,505 m (8,219 ft)
- Base elevation: 1,190 m (3,900 ft)
- Skiable area: 3,486 acres (14.1 km^{2})
- Trails: 129; 20% easiest 20% more difficult 45% most difficult 15% Expert
- Longest run: "It's A Ten" (10km long)
- Lift system: 1 gondola, 3 chairlifts, 1 surface lift
- Terrain parks: 1 as of 2023/24
- Snowfall: 7.5 m (24.6 ft)/year
- Website: KickingHorseResort.com

Kicking Horse Mountain Resort (KHMR) is a ski resort located 6.4 kilometres (4.0 mi) west of Golden, British Columbia, Canada. It features over 120 trails across more than 3,486 acres (14.11 km^{2}) of skiable terrain and a 1,315-metre (4,314 ft) vertical drop, currently the seventh largest of any North American ski resort and third largest in Canada. The resort, named after the nearby Kicking Horse River and Kicking Horse Pass, spans the easternmost slope of the Dogtooth Range of the Purcell Mountains overlooking the Rocky Mountain Trench. It is located roughly 7 kilometres (4 mi) east of Glacier National Park and 23 kilometres (14 mi) west of Yoho National Park.

== History ==
Whitetooth Ski Area, a smaller facility owned by the town of Golden opened in 1986 with the installation of the Pioneer Chair and three runs on 2,000 feet of vertical. Over the following years, additional runs and glades were cut expanding the skiable terrain. The mountain became popular with skiers from adjacent towns on Powder Fridays as the hill was closed Monday through Thursday, so any new snow that fell during the week was untracked.

Towards the end of the 90's, locals became increasingly concerned about the financial viability of Whitetooth in the event that the Pioneer chair ever needed to be replaced. In 1996, Mayor Fred Demmon approached Vancouver architect Oberto Oberti and discussed the possibility of finding investors to rehabilitate Whitetooth. Oberto Oberti presented the opportunity to his client, Ballast Nedam, the company that constructed the Confederation Bridge. Ballast Nedam was obligated to re-invest in Canada as part of its contract and purchased Whitetooth after the community voted 92.8 percent in favour of the sale on 20 September 1997. Oberto Oberti's office prepared a new Master Plan for the resort, which was approved in 1999, along with a Master Development Agreement with the province of British Columbia.

Construction began in the summer of 2000 and the expanded resort, now featuring the Eagle Eye Gondola and Catamount fixed grip chair, reopened under the new name on 8 December 2000. The majority of the skiable area consists of four large bowls (Crystal Bowl, Bowl Over, Feuz Bowl and Super Bowl) that combine about halfway down the mountain into a single area, with a fairly gentle ski-out to the lifts at the bottom. One run, It's a 10, is a 10 km long green run that connects the runs in the main Bowl areas. In 2002 a new chairlift (Stairway to Heaven) was added to allow access to a third bowl (Feuz Bowl), which generally sees less traffic. In 2010, a fourth bowl to the south of the existing resort (Super Bowl) was added to the area adding over 300 metres of new vertical. For 2018, the Ozone area was added to the in bounds ski area after serving as the venue for the Freeride World Tour. This added 600 acres to the ski area (now over 3400 acres) and increased the top elevation to over 2500m.

The resort applied for an expanded Master Plan, which was approved in 2009. In 2011, the resort was sold to Resorts of the Canadian Rockies, the current owners.

== Lifts ==
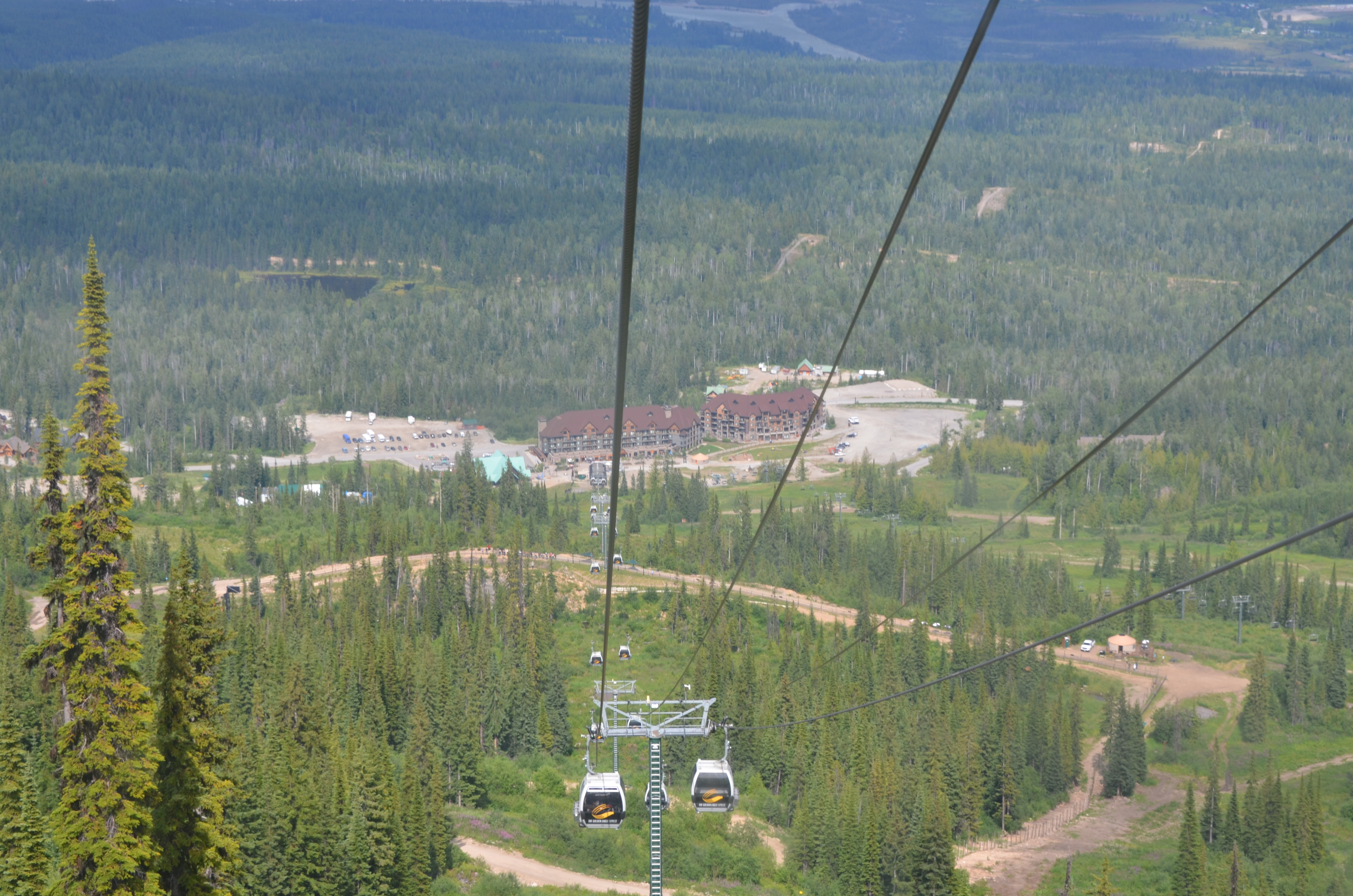
The Golden Eagle Express at Kicking Horse Resort

The hill is served primarily by a high-speed gondola, the Golden Eagle Express, that rises from the base area to the peak. Two smaller chairlifts also operate from the base area, a fixed-grip quad (Catamount) and a fixed-grip double (Pioneer - a relic from Whitetooth days). Another fixed-grip quad (Stairway to Heaven) serves the upper areas to the north of the gondola, including the third bowl. Uphill capacity is generally limited, however, and most skiers need to return to the summit via the gondola at the base of the mountain.

Name	Type	Capacity (people per hour)	Speed (metres per second)	Make	Year built
Golden Eagle Express	8-person high-speed gondola	1,200	5.6	Poma	2000
Stairway to Heaven	4-person fixed-grip chairlift	1,000	2.3	Leitner-Poma	2002
Catamount	4-person fixed-grip chairlift	1,200	2.3	Poma	2000
Pioneer	2-person fixed-grip chairlift	1,500	2.5	Riblet	1986
Jelly Bean	Surface lift	600	0.7	-	-

=== Incidents ===
On March 10, 2025, gondola cabin #15 broke from apparent metal failure of the connecting arm. The cabin only fell a few feet and no serious injuries were reported. Ski patrollers, aided by a helicopter, cleared the cabins over a period of at least 6 hours.

== Winter activities ==
Kicking Horse is frequented by skiers, snowboarders, snowskaters and telemarkers.

Annual average snowfall is 730 cm (290") at the mid-mountain station and higher in the alpine. The total in boundary ski area is over 3400 Acres. The slopes are well known for the light and dry snow, dubbed Champagne Powder. The resort is open for skiing from mid December to mid April, and for mountain biking and sightseeing from late June to early October.

=== Ski terrain ===
The gondola accesses CPR Ridge, Crystal Bowl and Bowl Over. Crystal Bowl is large and open, providing intermediate skiing and is the easiest way down from the gondola. Bowl Over is also open but much steeper and often has more moguls than Crystal Bowl. In 2007, a trail was made to allow for advanced intermediate skiing into Bowl Over. CPR ridge is situated between the two bowls. One side of the ridge, the Crystal Bowl side, provides some of the 75 inbound chutes available at Kicking Horse. These chutes range from advanced to expert skiing. The other side of CPR Ridge is a series of glades.

Stairway to Heaven is a fixed chair lift that is situated at the bottom of Crystal Bowl and accesses White Wall, Feuz Bowl and Redemption Ridge. White Wall is a quick hike right of the chair and is rated expert skiing for some rock bands and large cornices. Feuz Bowl is advanced skiing, quite similar to CPR ridge. Stairway to Heaven follows Redemption Ridge. On one side are chutes into Feuz Bowl and the other side is a series of glades back into Crystal Bowl.

Terminator Ridge and Terminator Peak are situated on the left side of Bowl Over. On the south side of Terminator Ridge Super Bowl can be accessed. On the north side a few steep, narrow, expert chutes come back into Bowl Over. The hike to the top of Terminator Ridge is often well traveled and takes from fifteen to thirty minutes, depending on fitness.

Total Runs	137 including all inbound chutes
Beginner	20%
Intermediate	20%
Advanced	45%
Expert	15%

=== Backcountry access ===
Kicking Horse has exceptional backcountry access. South of the resort, Super Bowl can be accessed by hiking up Terminator Ridge. North of the resort, Rudi's Bowl and many other backcountry assets are accessible.

== Summer activities ==
=== Mountain biking ===
Kicking Horse is open during the summer for downhill mountain biking accessed by the gondola. After Whistler's 5,020-foot (1,530 m) vertical drop, Kicking Horse provides the second longest descent in Canada for mountain biking.

=== Grizzly Bear Refuge ===
A fenced refuge for a single grizzly bear, known as "Boo," exists within resort terrain. The area is visible from the gondola, and an interpretive center accessible via the Catamount chair operates for tourism in the summer season.
