= Golden, British Columbia =

Golden
- Town
- Town of Golden
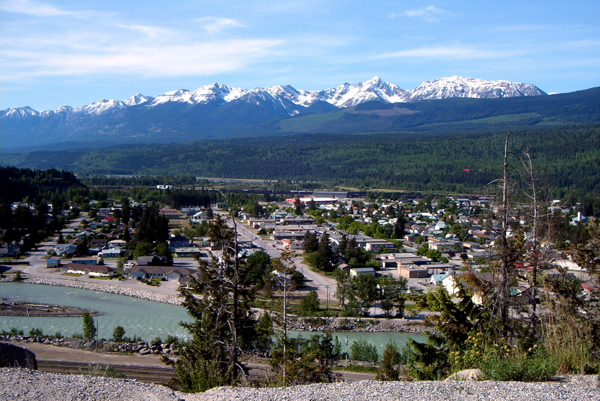
- View of Golden in 2005

- Seal

- Location of Golden in British Columbia
- Coordinates: 51°18′7″N 116°58′0″W
- Country: Canada
- Province: British Columbia
- Region: Columbia Valley
- Regional District: Columbia-Shuswap
- Incorporated: 1957

Government
  - Mayor: Kristi Cooper
  - Governing Body: Golden Town Council
  - MP: Mel Arnold (Conservative-Kamloops—Shuswap—Central Rockies)
  - MLA: Scott McInnis (BC Conservative-Columbia River-Revelstoke)

Area
  - Total: 11.33 km^{2} (4.37 sq mi)
- Elevation: 800 m (2,600 ft)

Population (2021)
  - Total: 3,986
  - Density: 351.9/km^{2} (911/sq mi)
- Time zone: UTC−7 (Mountain Standard Time)
  - Summer (DST): UTC−6 (Mountain Daylight Time (prior to November 2026))
- Postal code span: V0A 1H0 & V0A 0A0
- Area code: 250 / 778 / 236
- Highways: Highway 1 (TCH)Trans-Canada Highway; Highway 95
- Website: www.golden.ca

Golden is a town in southeastern British Columbia, Canada, 262 kilometres (163 mi) west of Calgary, Alberta, and 713 kilometres (443 mi) east of Vancouver.

== History ==
In 1807, David Thompson – renowned fur trader, surveyor, and map maker – was tasked by the North West Company to open a trading route to the lucrative trading territories of the Pacific Northwest. He first crossed over the Rocky Mountains and travelled along the Blaeberry River to the future site of Golden.

In 1881, the Canadian Pacific Railway (CPR) hired surveyor A. B. Rogers to find a rail route through the Selkirk and Rocky Mountains, and in 1882, he found the pass now named for him. Rogers established a base camp for his survey crew led by a man named McMillan. Initially known as McMillan's Camp, the settlement was the beginning of the town of Golden.

In the late 1890s, the CPR began importing Swiss mountain guides to assist travellers drawn to the area, Glacier National Park, Yoho National Park and the Rogers Pass region, as part of their efforts to promote tourism to the area's mountain parks. The railway built a group of chalet-style houses in an area known as Edelweiss, some of them still standing, to encourage guides to bring their families to Canada and remain year-round. The men were some of those early ascenders of local mountains and helped pioneer the ski industry in the region.

Golden is also the site of notable South Asian Canadian history, after Sikh settlers first arrived in Golden in 1902 to work at the Columbia River Lumber Company. These early settlers built the first gurdwara (Sikh temple) in North America in 1905, which burned down in 1926.

Much of the town's history is tied into the CPR and the logging industry. The town's economy still relies heavily on those two influences, but the development of Kicking Horse Mountain Resort, along with other outdoor adventure companies, has allowed the town to diversify into tourism. Mount 7, which is just southeast of town, is also an outdoor activity destination. The town forms part of the Golden Triangle cycle route.

Kicking Horse Pedestrian Bridge is the longest freestanding timber-framed bridge in Canada. Planned as a community project by the Timber Framers Guild, volunteers from Golden were joined by carpenters and timber framers from the United States and from Europe. The bridge structure is 46 metres (150 ft) long, with a 95-tonne (210,000 lb) Burr arch structure. The bridge was completed in September 2001.

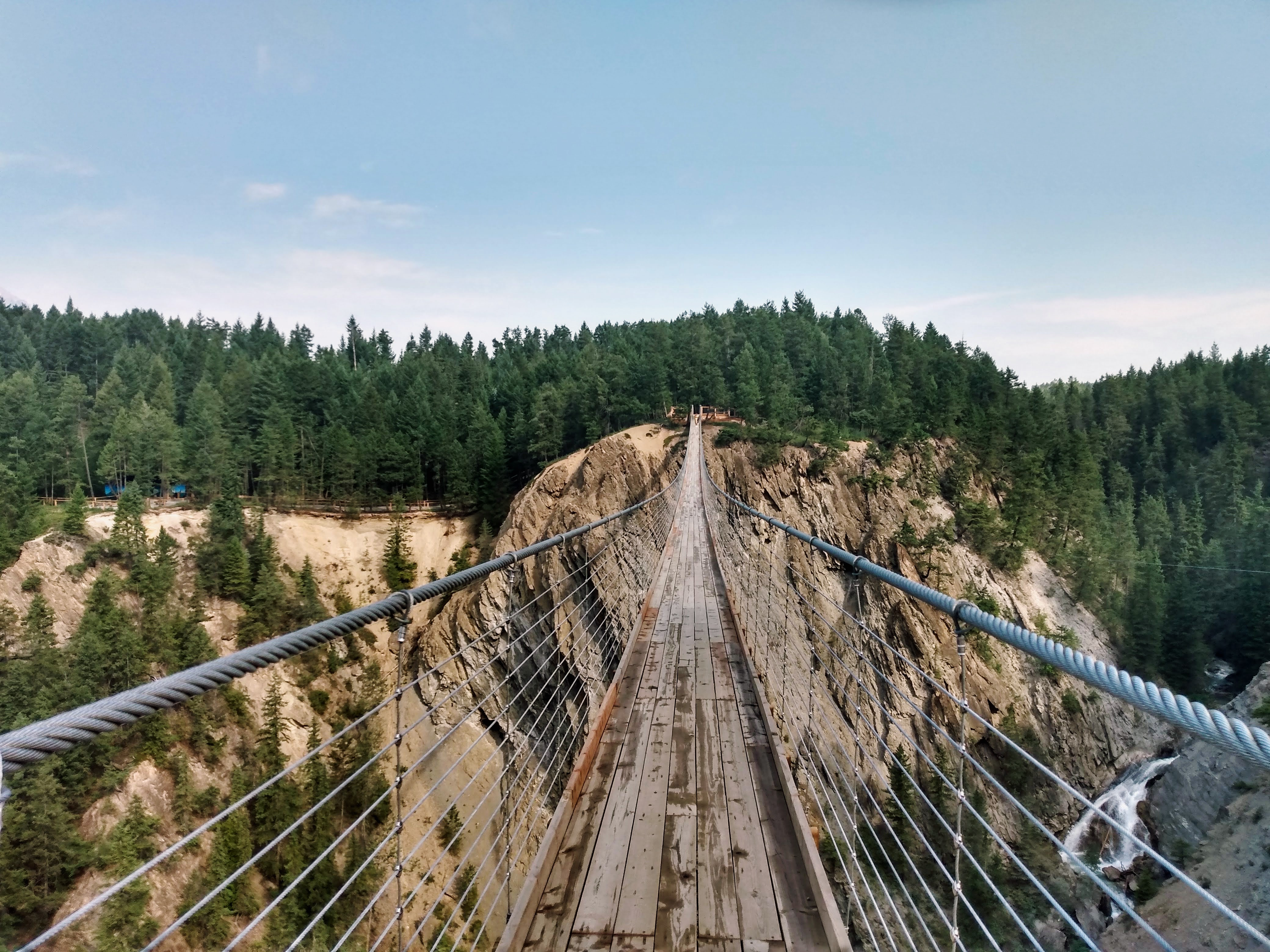
Golden Skybridge

In June 2021, the Golden Skybridge opened. The bridge is the highest suspension bridge in Canada.

The Golden meteorites fell there on October 4, 2021.

== Geography ==
Golden is nestled in the Rocky Mountain Trench, built around the confluence of the Columbia and Kicking Horse rivers, surrounded by three different mountain ranges (most notably the Dogtooth Range of the Purcell Mountains and the Rocky Mountains) and five national parks: Yoho National Park, Banff National Park, Jasper National Park, Glacier National Park, and Kootenay National Park.

Golden is on Highway 1 (the Trans-Canada Highway), and it is the northern terminus of Highway 95, connecting it to the United States via the rest of the East Kootenay region and the city of Cranbrook, British Columbia (B.C. Highway 95 is a continuation of U.S. Route 95, which runs north-to-south through the U.S. and into Mexico). The Trans-Canada Highway east of Golden has numerous upgrade projects ongoing to greatly improve the roadway west of the Yoho National Park boundary. The Ten Mile Hill section of the project was recently completed and is a major upgrade to the old highway.

=== Climate ===
Golden has a climate with influences of the humid continental (Dfb) and semi-arid (BSk) varieties. Summers are warm but rarely hot, with winters being somewhat moderated in comparison to areas east of the Rockies. Annual snowfall is heavy, averaging 184 centimetres (72 in).

Climate data for Golden Airport
Month	Jan	Feb	Mar	Apr	May	Jun	Jul	Aug	Sep	Oct	Nov	Dec	Year
Record high humidex	6.7	8.4	19.6	25.5	34.2	41.0	38.5	38.4	32.0	22.4	11.2	5.4	41.0
Record high °C (°F)	8.3 (46.9)	12.2 (54.0)	20.2 (68.4)	28.9 (84.0)	35.6 (96.1)	40.7 (105.3)	40.0 (104.0)	37.8 (100.0)	33.9 (93.0)	25.6 (78.1)	17.2 (63.0)	10.0 (50.0)	40.7 (105.3)
Mean daily maximum °C (°F)	−4.3 (24.3)	−0.1 (31.8)	6.6 (43.9)	13.3 (55.9)	18.4 (65.1)	21.7 (71.1)	24.5 (76.1)	24.2 (75.6)	18.4 (65.1)	10.1 (50.2)	1.0 (33.8)	−4.8 (23.4)	10.7 (51.3)
Daily mean °C (°F)	−7.9 (17.8)	−5 (23)	0.8 (33.4)	6.5 (43.7)	11.3 (52.3)	14.9 (58.8)	17.3 (63.1)	16.7 (62.1)	11.5 (52.7)	5.0 (41.0)	−2 (28)	−7.8 (18.0)	5.1 (41.2)
Mean daily minimum °C (°F)	−11.5 (11.3)	−9.8 (14.4)	−5 (23)	−0.5 (31.1)	4.1 (39.4)	8.0 (46.4)	10.0 (50.0)	9.1 (48.4)	4.6 (40.3)	−0.2 (31.6)	−5 (23)	−10.9 (12.4)	−0.6 (30.9)
Record low °C (°F)	−46.1 (−51.0)	−39.4 (−38.9)	−31.7 (−25.1)	−19.4 (−2.9)	−9.4 (15.1)	−6.7 (19.9)	−2.2 (28.0)	−2.8 (27.0)	−9.4 (15.1)	−18.3 (−0.9)	−32.8 (−27.0)	−43.9 (−47.0)	−46.1 (−51.0)
Record low wind chill	−42.3	−31.2	−28.1	−14.3	−5.5	0.0	0.0	0.0	−4.5	−15	−29.9	−38	−42.3
Average precipitation mm (inches)	45.9 (1.81)	24.1 (0.95)	24.4 (0.96)	24.4 (0.96)	34.5 (1.36)	49.7 (1.96)	50.6 (1.99)	45.3 (1.78)	38.0 (1.50)	34.9 (1.37)	51.1 (2.01)	43.9 (1.73)	466.8 (18.38)
Average rainfall mm (inches)	6.4 (0.25)	5.5 (0.22)	14.1 (0.56)	21.9 (0.86)	33.3 (1.31)	49.7 (1.96)	50.6 (1.99)	45.3 (1.78)	38.0 (1.50)	32.3 (1.27)	21.6 (0.85)	6.4 (0.25)	325.2 (12.80)
Average snowfall cm (inches)	45.3 (17.8)	20.7 (8.1)	12.1 (4.8)	2.5 (1.0)	1.1 (0.4)	0.0 (0.0)	0.0 (0.0)	0.0 (0.0)	0.0 (0.0)	2.8 (1.1)	31.8 (12.5)	42.5 (16.7)	158.7 (62.5)
Average precipitation days (≥ 0.2 mm)	14.6	9.1	9.8	10.6	12.5	15.4	13.7	13.2	10.6	12.1	13.9	13.5	148.8
Average rainy days (≥ 0.2 mm)	2.4	2.7	6.3	9.9	12.4	15.4	13.7	13.2	10.6	11.3	6.8	1.9	106.5
Average snowy days (≥ 0.2 cm)	13.5	7.1	4.8	1.5	0.2	0.0	0.0	0.0	0.0	1.3	8.2	12.8	49.5
Average relative humidity (%)	81.2	70.7	53.6	38.8	38.6	42.4	42.0	44.2	50.0	60.0	80.4	82.2	57.0
Mean monthly sunshine hours	25.2	55.3	111.3	155.2	209.6	194.1	227.0	228.9	162.5	85.0	26.1	12.9	1,492.9
Percentage possible sunshine	9.7	19.6	30.3	37.4	43.5	39.2	45.5	50.7	42.7	25.6	9.7	5.2	29.9
Source: ECCC

== Demographics ==
Historical population
Year	Pop.	±%
1981	3,476	—
1986	3,584	+3.1%
1991	3,721	+3.8%
1996	3,968	+6.6%
2001	4,020	+1.3%
2006	3,811	−5.2%
2011	3,701	−2.9%
2016	3,708	+0.2%
2021	3,986	+7.5%

In the 2021 Census of Population conducted by Statistics Canada, Golden had a population of 3,986 living in 1,734 of its 1,892 total private dwellings, a change of 7.5% from its 2016 population of 3,708. With a land area of 11.33 km^{2} (4.37 sq mi), it had a population density of 351.8/km^{2} (911.2/sq mi) in 2021.

=== Ethnicity ===
Panethnic groups in the Town of Golden (1986−2021)
Panethnic group	2021		2016		2006		2001		1996		1991		1986	
Panethnic group	Pop.	%	Pop.	%	Pop.	%	Pop.	%	Pop.	%	Pop.	%	Pop.	%
European (Note: Statistic includes all persons that did not make up part of a visible minority or an indigenous identity.)	3,200	82.05%	2,910	80.95%	3,310	87.68%	3,405	85.66%	3,440	87.42%	3,030	82.11%	2,965	84.23%
Indigenous	330	8.46%	360	10.01%	160	4.24%	255	6.42%	215	5.46%	265	7.18%	165	4.69%
South Asian	180	4.62%	125	3.48%	200	5.3%	250	6.29%	250	6.35%	340	9.21%	345	9.8%
Southeast Asian (Note: Statistic includes total responses of "Filipino" and "Southeast Asian" under visible minority section on census.)	100	2.56%	40	1.11%	10	0.26%	0	0%	0	0%	25	0.68%	5	0.14%
East Asian (Note: Statistic includes total responses of "Chinese", "Korean", and "Japanese" under visible minority section on census.)	40	1.03%	140	3.89%	75	1.99%	60	1.51%	25	0.64%	15	0.41%	25	0.71%
Latin American	10	0.26%	10	0.28%	0	0%	0	0%	0	0%	0	0%	10	0.28%
African	0	0%	0	0%	0	0%	10	0.25%	0	0%	0	0%	0	0%
Middle Eastern (Note: Statistic includes total responses of "West Asian" and "Arab" under visible minority section on census.)	0	0%	0	0%	0	0%	0	0%	0	0%	15	0.41%	5	0.14%
Other/multiracial (Note: Statistic includes total responses of "Visible minority, n.i.e." and "Multiple visible minorities" under visible minority section on census.)	0	0%	20	0.56%	0	0%	0	0%	0	0%	—N/a	—N/a	—N/a	—N/a
Total responses	3,900	97.84%	3,595	96.95%	3,775	99.06%	3,975	98.88%	3,935	99.17%	3,690	99.17%	3,520	98.21%
Total population	3,986	100%	3,708	100%	3,811	100%	4,020	100%	3,968	100%	3,721	100%	3,584	100%
Note: Totals greater than 100% due to multiple origin responses.

=== Religion ===
According to the 2021 census, religious groups in Golden included:

- Irreligion (2,430 persons or 62.3%)
- Christianity (1,225 persons or 31.4%)
- Sikhism (115 persons or 2.9%)
- Hinduism (40 persons or 1.0%)
- Buddhism (15 persons or 0.4%)
- Other (55 persons or 1.4%)

Religious groups in Golden (1991−2021)
Religious group	2021		2011		2001		1991	
Religious group	Pop.	%	Pop.	%	Pop.	%	Pop.	%
Christian	1,225	31.41%	N/A	N/A	2,240	56.35%	2,280	61.79%
Sikh	115	2.95%	N/A	N/A	165	4.15%	300	8.13%
Hindu	40	1.03%	N/A	N/A	0	0%	15	0.41%
Buddhist	15	0.38%	N/A	N/A	20	0.5%	30	0.81%
Muslim	0	0%	N/A	N/A	0	0%	40	1.08%
Jewish	0	0%	N/A	N/A	0	0%	0	0%
Other religion	55	1.41%	N/A	N/A	35	0.88%	10	0.27%
Irreligious	2,430	62.31%	N/A	N/A	1,495	37.61%	1,020	27.64%
Total responses	3,900	97.84%	N/A	N/A	3,975	98.88%	3,690	99.17%

== Economy ==
Golden has a service and resource-based economy.

== Education ==
Public education is provided by School District 6 Rocky Mountain which operates 3 primary schools and one secondary school. Post-secondary education is offered by the Golden Campus of the College of the Rockies.

== Sports ==
Club	League	Sport	Venue	Established	Championships
Golden Rockets	KIJHL	Ice Hockey	Golden Arena	1991	0

== Notable people ==
- Doug Barrault, retired hockey player
- Dillon Dubé, NHL player with the Calgary Flames
- David Duncan, freestyle skier
- Curtis McKenzie, NHL player with the Dallas Stars
- Patricia Owens, actress
- Sara Renner, Olympic medal-winning cross country skier

== See also ==
- List of francophone communities in British Columbia
