= Lucier =

Lucier is a French surname that derives from the name Lussier. Notable people with the name include:

- Alvin Lucier (1931–2021), American composer
- Étienne Lucier (1793–1853), French-Canadian fur trader in the Pacific Northwest
- James P. Lucier (born c. 1934), American author and a former staff member of the United States Senate
- Lou Lucier (1918–2014), American baseball pitcher
- Mary Lucier (born 1944), American artist
- Paul Lucier (1930–1999), Canadian politician
- Wayne Lucier (born 1979), American gridiron football player

== See also ==
- Lucier (restaurant), a former restaurant in Portland, Oregon, U.S.
