= James W. Nance =

United States Navy officer and government official (1921-1999)

Bud Nance
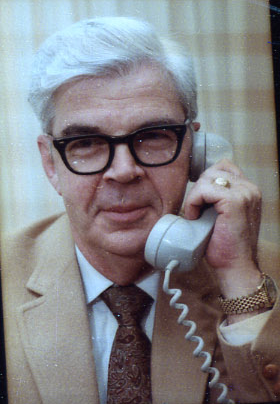

Deputy National Security Advisor
- In office January 21, 1981 – January 20, 1982
- President: Ronald Reagan
- Preceded by: David L. Aaron
- Succeeded by: Robert McFarlane

National Security Advisor
- Acting; November 30, 1981 – January 4, 1982
- President: Ronald Reagan
- Preceded by: Richard V. Allen
- Succeeded by: William P. Clark Jr.

Personal details
- Born: James Wilson Nance; August 20, 1921 Monroe, North Carolina, U.S.
- Died: May 11, 1999 (aged 77) Bethesda, Maryland, U.S.
- Resting place: Arlington National Cemetery
- Party: Republican
- Spouse: Mary Faulk (m. 1941)
- Education: North Carolina State University (attended); United States Naval Academy (BS); George Washington University (MA)

Military service
- Allegiance: United States
- Branch/service: United States Navy
- Years of service: 1941–1979
- Rank: Rear Admiral
- Commands: USS Raleigh; USS Forrestal
- Battles/wars: World War II • Battle of Iwo Jima • Battle of Okinawa; Korean War; Vietnam War
- Awards: Distinguished Service Medal (2); Legion of Merit

James Wilson "Bud" Nance (August 20, 1921 – May 11, 1999) was a United States Navy officer who was the 10th Deputy National Security Advisor from 1981 to 1982, also briefly the acting National Security Advisor. A childhood friend of Senator Jesse Helms, he later worked as a Congressional aide.

== Early life and education ==
James Wilson Nance was born in Monroe, North Carolina, on August 20, 1921. He grew up two blocks away from a young Jesse Helms, born two months after him. The two were lifelong friends, and played in the school band together with Skipper Bowles at Monroe High School: Helms played the tuba; Bowles, the trumpet; and Nance, the clarinet. After high school, Nance attended North Carolina State University and the United States Naval Academy in Annapolis, Maryland, graduating in 1944. He later graduated from George Washington University with a Master of Arts in international relations.

== Naval career ==
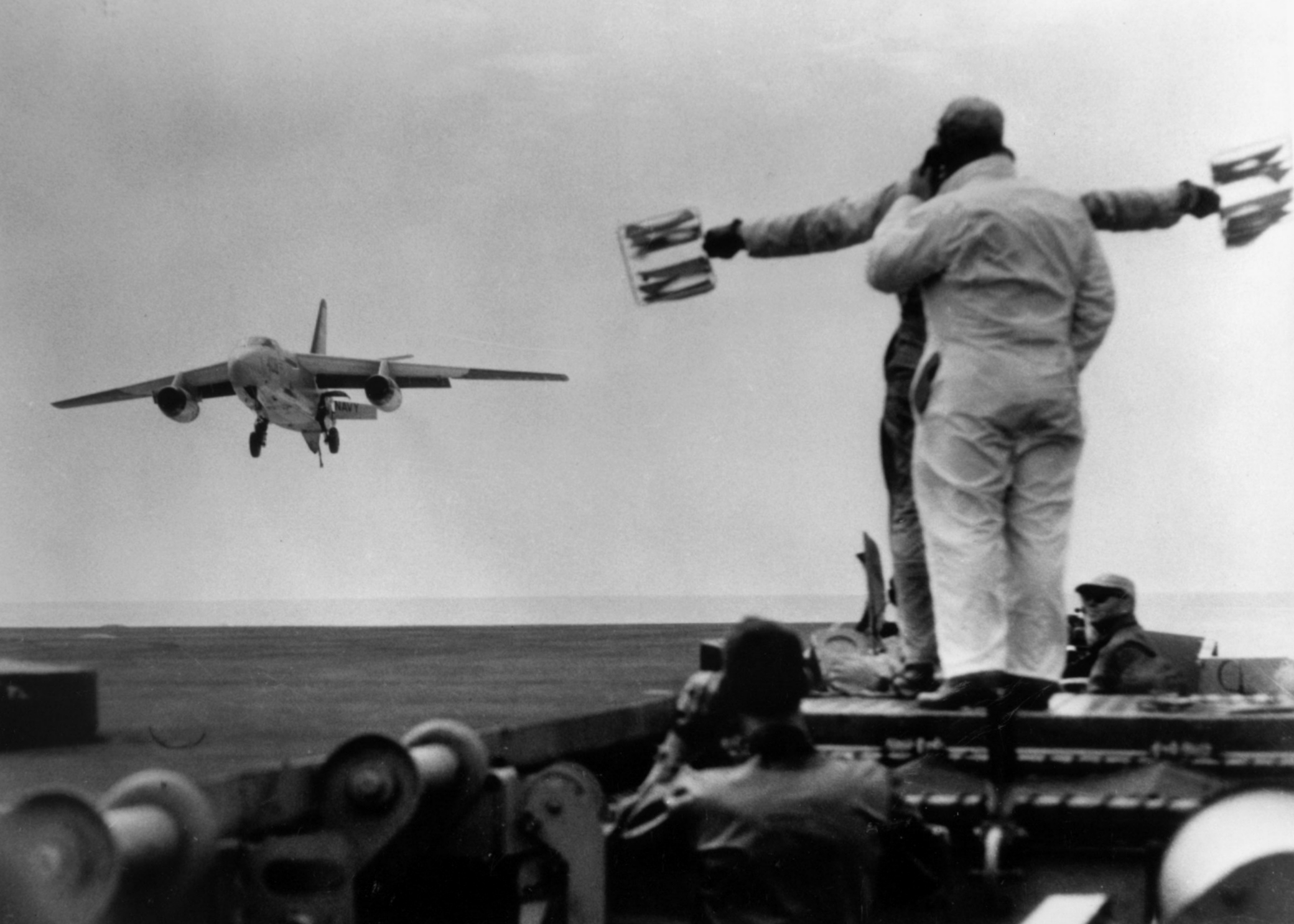
Nance testing the Douglas A-3 Skywarrior aboard USS Forrestal in 1956

Following his graduation from Annapolis, Nance was commissioned as an ensign into the United States Navy later that year; he saw service in World War II, serving on USS North Carolina, and fighting at the Battle of Iwo Jima, as he later reminded ambassadors regarding hardship pay for service in hardship posts.

After the war, he became a naval aviator in 1946, and tested jets for the Navy until the end of the 1950s, flying with John Glenn and Alan Shepard; he also served in the Korean War and in the Vietnam War.

Between Korea and Vietnam, he was seconded to the Royal Navy, serving aboard HMS Bulwark, as a pilot, in the mid-1950s. On his return to the United States, in 1956, he tested the Douglas A-3 Skywarrior and its landing capabilities on USS Forrestal.

In the 1960s, he commanded a carrier squadron, from November 1967 to October 1968, the USS Raleigh (LPD-1), and from December 1968 to late 1969, the USS Forrestal. During his time as skipper, Forrestal suffered a minor fire at Norfolk Navy Yard that injured eight.

In 1970, he was attached to the National Military Command Center, as the deputy director, before becoming an aide to General Alexander Haig later in the decade, during Haig's time as Supreme Allied Commander Europe. He capped his naval career at the Pentagon, as assistant vice chief of naval operations.

== Consultant ==
After retiring from the Navy on January 1, 1979, with the rank of rear admiral, Nance became a consultant for the Saudi Arabian government, reorganizing the Royal Saudi Navy. He also was a consultant for the United States Senate, helping Helms with the proposed SALT II treaties.

== White House career ==
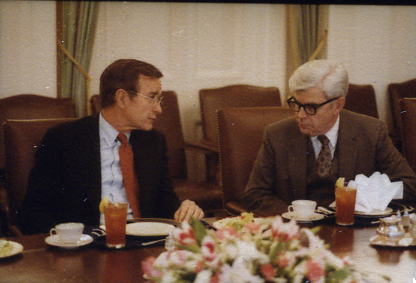
At lunch with Vice President George H. W. Bush on January 4, 1982

Nance was sworn in as Deputy National Security Advisor on January 21, 1981, with the start of President Ronald Reagan's term.

At the time, the United States National Security Council under Richard V. Allen, the National Security Advisor, was split into four, with Major General Robert L. Schweitzer heading the military quarter, and Nance above him; Nance, considered well-connected, later took on Schweitzer's duties after the general's removal from the council for inopportune remarks. Allen also placed him in charge of a secret effort, Operation Golden Eagle, to resolve the Vietnam War POW/MIA issue by finding and releasing any men held: the first attempt failed, a second attempt was delayed, and further action was scrapped by the end of the year, by which point Allen was out of the White House.

On November 29, 1981, Nance was named acting National Security Advisor, after Allen took a leave of absence due to an investigation into the discovery of $1000 in his safe. He entered into his duties the next morning, sending President Reagan his daily brief.

Nance, though somewhat deferential, was considered better than Allen, especially in terms of administration—though he was not perceived as a candidate for the job permanently. Still, during his short tenure as acting National Security Advisor, Nance informed Vice President George H. W. Bush about the imposition of martial law in Poland, and helped the Reagan administration draft a response to it. He also hired Oliver North and John Poindexter, among others.

With Allen's resignation and replacement with William P. Clark Jr. on January 4, 1982, Nance ceased being the acting National Security Advisor; despite the pleas of some within the White House, he was then removed as Deputy National Security Advisor on January 20, 1982, instead shifting to a lesser role as one assistant among many, though Larry Speakes claimed that he was put in charge of certain special projects.

In March 1982, he was moved out of national security entirely, and appointed the director of the Private Sector Survey on Cost Control, led by J. Peter Grace.

== Congressional aide ==
Nance soon returned to the private sector, working for the Boeing Military Airplane Company; and supporting Helms, even paying his filing fee in 1990.

In late 1991, the senator coaxed his friend out of retirement, appointing him as the minority staff director for the United States Senate Committee on Foreign Relations in January 1992, replacing James P. Lucier and removing other aides. With the Republican Revolution in 1994, Nance became the majority staff director for Helms, now the chairman of the committee. He also worked for minimum wage, after failing in an attempt to work for nothing; he called his 38-fold pay increase in 1995 "living high off the hog".

As his old friend and fellow conservative, Nance had the rare ability to persuade the obstinate and obstructionist Helms to support certain measures, such as the START II treaty. Still, the admiral came under fire: a North Carolina POW/MIA group began a national letter-writing campaign against him in 1995, claiming that, in firing Lucier and other aides, he had turned Helms away from the POW/MIA issue; and the next year, when Ruth Marcus of The Washington Post revealed that the Jesse Helms Center, of which Nance was a board member, received hundreds of thousands of dollars from the governments of Taiwan and Kuwait, as well as from R. J. Reynolds Tobacco Company, United States Tobacco Company and Milliken & Company.

Still, Nance endured; and though his health declined over time—in 1997, he suffered serious injuries in a car accident—Nance, seen as the more genial gentleman to Helms's more feisty populism, continued to work, often arriving at 7 am.

== Death ==
Nance died on May 11, 1999, from complications from myelodysplasia, at the National Institutes of Health campus in Bethesda, Maryland. A few hours before his death, Senator Helms had tearfully requested prayers for Nance from his fellow senators; their tributes took up 13 whole pages of the Congressional Record. He was later replaced as staff director by Stephen Biegun.

He is buried at Arlington National Cemetery.

Nance was survived by his wife, Mary Lyda and his four children.

Political offices
Preceded by David L. Aaron	Deputy National Security Advisor; 1981–1982	Succeeded by Robert McFarlane
Preceded by Richard V. Allen	National Security Advisor; Acting; 1981–1982	Succeeded by William P. Clark Jr.
