= Shark Tooth Mountain (British Columbia) =

Mountain in British Columbia, Canada

- Location within British Columbia

Highest point
- Elevation: 2,533 m (8,310 ft)
- Prominence: 1,011 m (3,317 ft)
- Coordinates: 50°04′05.9″N 115°34′14.9″W

Geography
- Location: British Columbia, Canada
- District: Kootenay Land District
- Parent range: Kootenay Ranges, Canadian Rockies
- Topo map: NTS 82J4 Canal Flats

Shark Tooth Mountain, officially named in 1954, is also known as The Sharktooth or Sharp Tooth Mountain. It is a mountain in the East Kootenay region of southeastern British Columbia, Canada, southwest of Whiteswan Lake. Presumably, the name is related to the profile of the peak. It sits to the southwest of Whiteswan Lake Provincial Park, with Lussier Hot Springs and Ram Creek Hot Springs nearby, and is part of the Kootenay Ranges subdivision of the Canadian Rockies in Western Alberta and most of British Columbia.
