= Lussier =

Lussier or Loussier is a surname of French origin. According to Ancestry.com, "the name is an occupational name from Old French uissier 'usher', 'doorkeeper', with the definite article l(e). L'Huissier is a title of nobility given to the king's usher. The usher's responsibilities include acting as the court bailiff, collecting fines and taxes; and overseeing the finances of the manors of the kingdom. The name was a title of nobility. The occupation can also be an official in the courts and prisons or a doorkeeper of the legislative chamber.

The Canadian family "Lussier" can be traced to Pierre L'Huissier (1600–1688), the Bailiff of Paris. When Pierre L'Huissier's grandson, Jacques (1646–1713), arrived in New France, the name was recorded as "Lussier." According to the Family Education site the name is: "French [meaning]: A bearer of the name from Paris was in Quebec City by 1669."

According to the website "House of Names," the name could be of Italian origin as it states: "The surname Lussier was first found in Bolgna (Latin: Bononia)...The Liuzza of Luzzi or Luzzo were first recorded as nobility in the year 972 and may have originally been from Cremona."

There are numerous spellings of the name, including L'Huissier, Lussier, Lucier, Lucia, Lucye, Lussye, Luce, and several other variations.

Lussier or Loussier may refer to:

== People ==
Listed alphabetically by first name

- Albert-Alexandre Lussier (1842–1909), Canadian seigneur and political figure in Quebec
- André Lussier (1933–2009), Canadian physician, rheumatologist, and professor
- Anthoine Lussier (born 1983), French ice hockey player
- Dane Lussier (1909–1959), American screenwriter
- Dominic Lussier (born 1984), Canadian weightlifter
- Doris Lussier (1918–1993), Canadian comedian, actor, and political activist
- Emile John Lussier (1895–1974), American flying ace during World War I
- Emmanuelle Lussier-Martinez, Canadian actress
- Felix Faubert-Lussier (born 1991), Canadian gridiron football player
- Jacques Loussier (1934–2019), French pianist and composer
- Jean Lussier (1891–1971), Canadian-American stunt performer and Niagara Falls daredevil
- Marcel Lussier (born 1944), Canadian politician
- Pascal Lussier (born 1991), Canadian rower
- Patrick Lussier (born 1964), Canadian-American filmmaker and editor
- René Lussier (born 1957), Canadian musician
- Robert Lussier (1924–1994), Canadian politician
- Steve Lussier (born 1973), Canadian politician in Quebec
- Yves A. Lussier, Canadian physician-scientist

== Other uses ==
- Stella Loussier, a fictional character in the anime Mobile Suit Gundam SEED
- Lussier Hot Springs, a hot spring in Whiteswan Lake Provincial Park, British Columbia, Canada
- Lussier River, a tributary of the Kootenay River, British Columbia, Canada

== See also ==
- Lucier, a surname
