= United States National Security Advisor =

White House advisory position

Assistant to the President for National Security Affairs
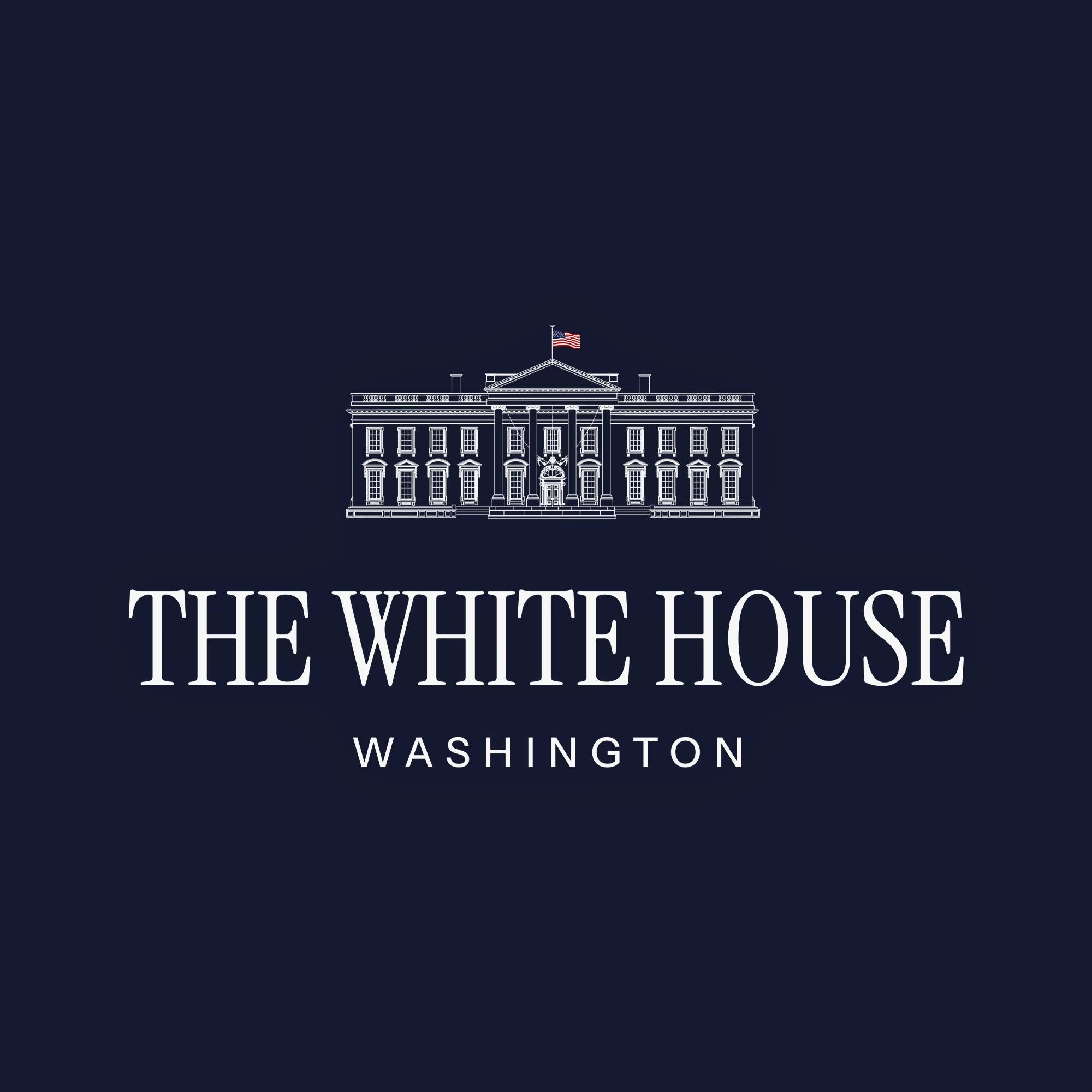

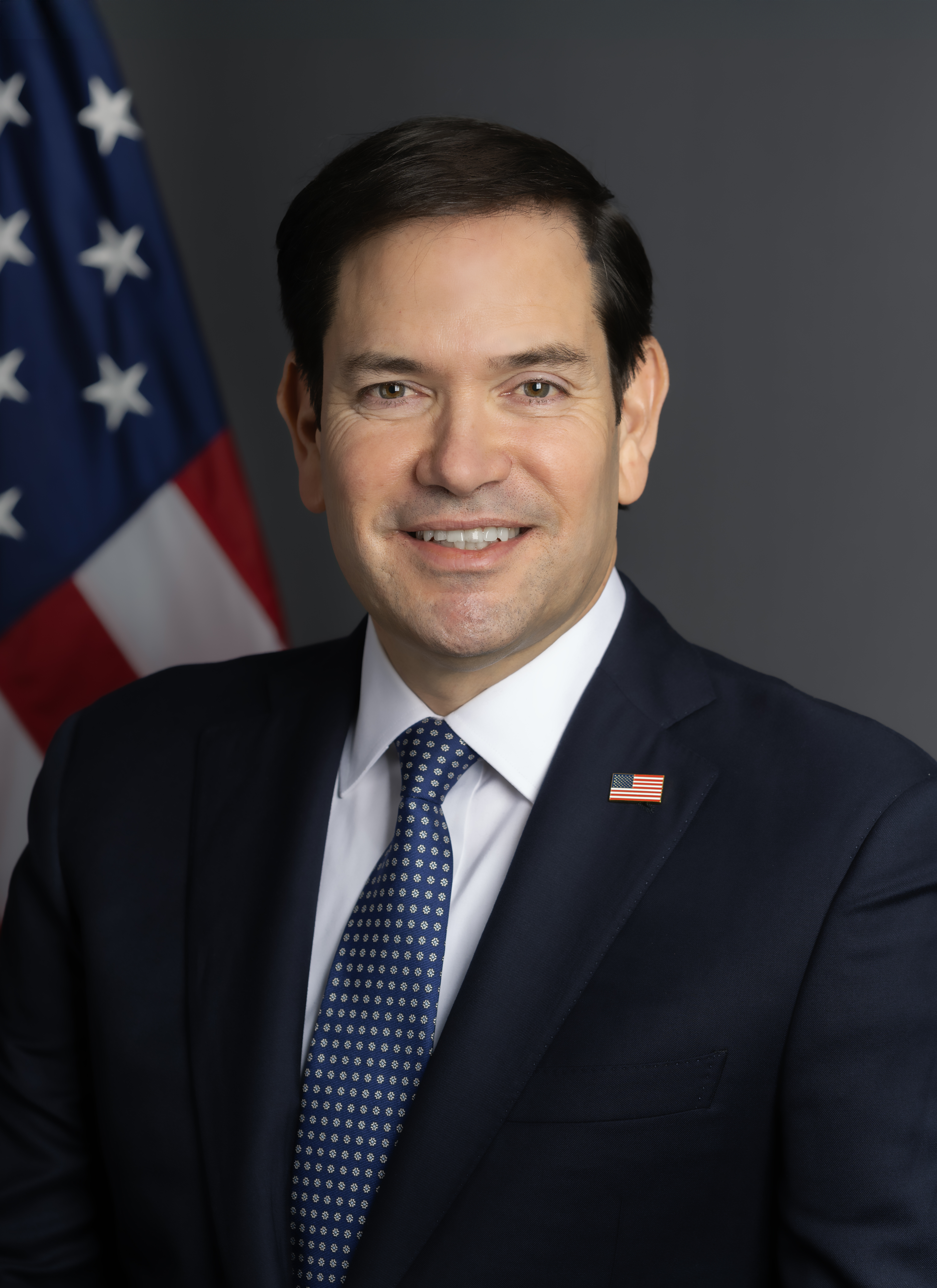
- Incumbent; Marco Rubio since May 1, 2025; Acting: May 1, 2025 – September 22, 2026
- Executive Office of the President
- Member of: National Security Council; Homeland Security Council
- Reports to: President of the United States
- Appointer: President of the United States
- Constituting instrument: National Security Presidential Memorandum
- Formation: 1953
- First holder: Robert Cutler
- Deputy: Deputy National Security Advisor
- Website: wh.gov/nsc

The assistant to the president for national security affairs (APNSA), commonly referred to as the national security advisor (NSA), (Note: Abbreviated NSA, or sometimes APNSA or ANSA in order to avoid confusion with the abbreviation of the National Security Agency.) is a senior aide in the Executive Office of the President, based at the West Wing of the White House.

The national security advisor serves as the principal advisor to the president of the United States on all national security issues. The national security advisor participates in meetings of the National Security Council (NSC) and usually chairs meetings of the principals committee of the NSC with the secretary of state and secretary of defense (those meetings not attended by the president). The NSA also sits on the Homeland Security Council (HSC). The national security advisor is supported by NSC staff who produce classified research and briefings for the national security advisor to review and present, either to the NSC or the president.

The national security advisor is appointed by the president and does not require confirmation by the United States Senate. An appointment of a three- or four-star general to the role requires Senate confirmation to maintain that rank in the new position. The national security advisor has been Marco Rubio since May 1, 2025.

== Role ==
The influence and responsibilities of the national security advisor vary among administrations, depending on factors such as the individual appointed to the position and the president's approach to decision-making and White House management. The national security advisor typically coordinates the presentation of national security policy options to the president and may also play a role in shaping or advocating for particular policies, depending on the administration.

The national security advisor is a staff position in the Executive Office of the President and does not have line or budget authority over either the Department of State or the Department of Defense, unlike the secretary of state and the secretary of defense, who are Senate-confirmed officials with statutory authority over their departments. The national security advisor is able to offer daily advice (due to the proximity) to the president independently of the vested interests of the large bureaucracies and clientele of those departments.

In times of crisis, the national security advisor is likely to operate from the White House Situation Room or the Presidential Emergency Operations Center (as on September 11, 2001), updating the president on the latest events in a crisis situation.

== History ==
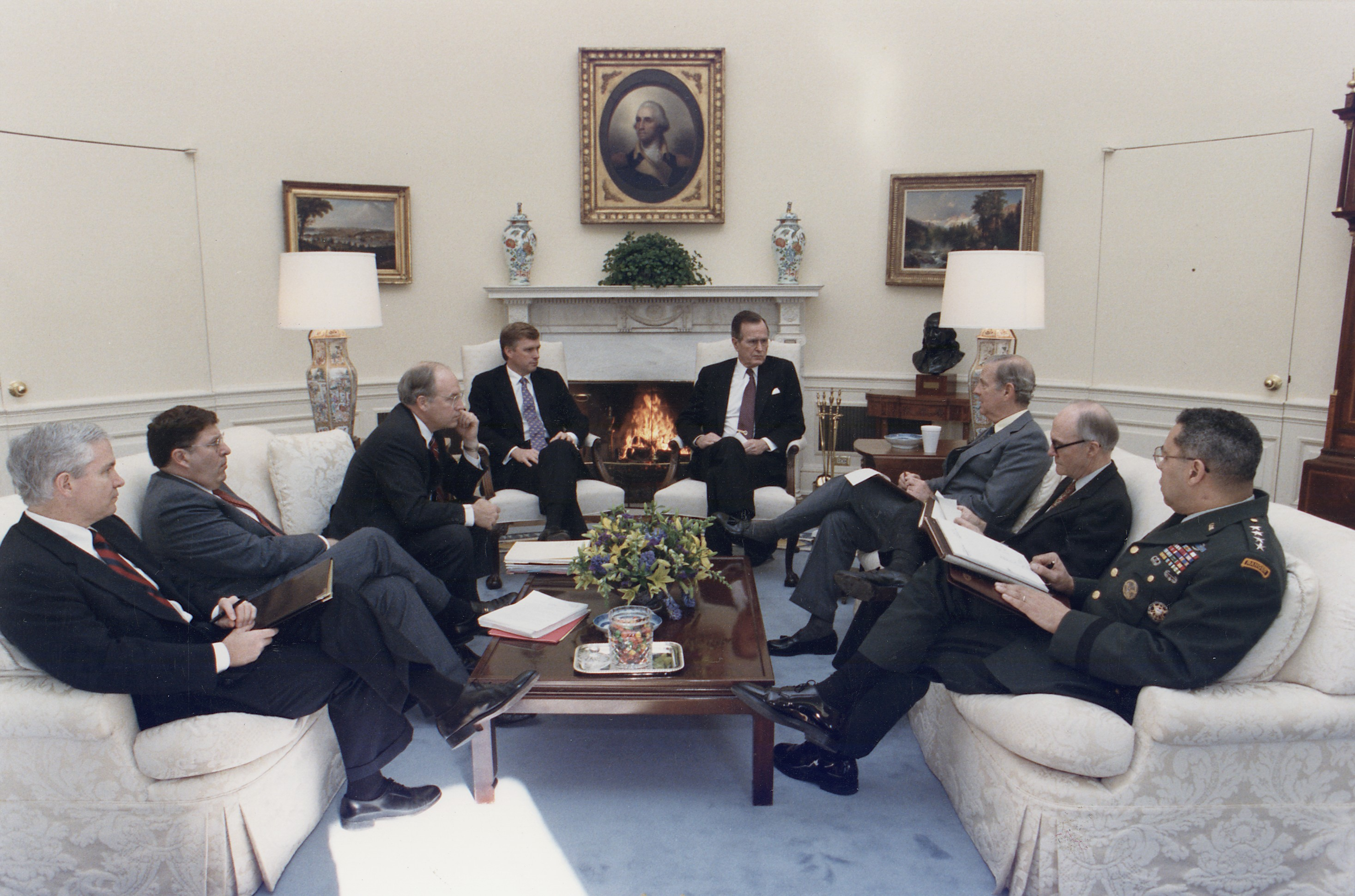
President George H. W. Bush meets in the Oval Office with his NSC Brent Scowcroft about Operation Desert Shield, 1991. Dick Cheney and Colin Powell are also present in the room.

The immediate predecessor to the National Security Council was the National Intelligence Authority (NIA), which was established by President Harry S. Truman's Executive Letter of January 22, 1946, to oversee the Central Intelligence Group, the CIA's predecessor. The NIA was composed of the secretary of state (James F. Byrnes and George C. Marshall), the secretary of war (Robert P. Patterson), the secretary of the Navy (James Forrestal), and a personal representative of President Truman (William D. Leahy, the chief of staff to the commander in chief).

The National Security Council was created at the start of the Cold War under the National Security Act of 1947 to coordinate defense, foreign affairs, international economic policy, and intelligence; this was part of a large reorganization that saw the creation of the Department of Defense and the Central Intelligence Agency. The Act did not create the position of the national security advisor per se, but it did create an executive secretary in charge of the staff. In 1949, the NSC became part of the Executive Office of the President.

Robert Cutler was the first national security advisor in 1953, and held the job twice, both times during the Eisenhower administration. The system has remained largely unchanged since then, particularly since President John F. Kennedy, with powerful national security advisors and strong staff but a lower importance given to formal NSC meetings. This continuity persists despite the tendency of each new president to replace the advisor and senior NSC staff.

President Richard Nixon's national security advisor, Henry Kissinger, enhanced the importance of the role, controlling the flow of information to the president and meeting with him multiple times per day. Kissinger also holds the distinction of serving as national security advisor and secretary of state at the same time from September 22, 1973, until November 3, 1975. He holds the record for longest term of service (2,478 days); Michael Flynn holds the record for shortest term, at just 24 days.

Brent Scowcroft held the job in two non-consecutive administrations: the Ford administration and the George H. W. Bush administration.

== List ==
Democratic Republican Independent

Denotes acting capacity.

President's Representative to the National Intelligence Authority

Image	Name	Start	End	Duration	Ref(s)	President
	William D. Leahy	January 22, 1946	July 26, 1947	1 year, 185 days		Harry S. Truman (1945–1953)

Executive Secretaries of the National Security Council

Image	Name	Start	End	Duration	Ref(s)	President
	Sidney Souers	July 26, 1947	December 21, 1949	2 years, 148 days		Harry S. Truman (1945–1953)
	James Lay	December 21, 1949	January 20, 1953	3 years, 30 days		Harry S. Truman (1945–1953)

National Security Advisors

No.	Image	Name	Start	End	Duration	Ref(s)	President
1		Robert Cutler	March 23, 1953	April 2, 1955	2 years, 10 days		Dwight D. Eisenhower (1953–1961)
2		Dillon Anderson	April 2, 1955	September 1, 1956	1 year, 152 days		Dwight D. Eisenhower (1953–1961)
–		William Jackson; Acting	September 1, 1956	January 7, 1957	128 days		Dwight D. Eisenhower (1953–1961)
3		Robert Cutler	January 7, 1957	June 24, 1958	1 year, 168 days		Dwight D. Eisenhower (1953–1961)
4		Gordon Gray	June 24, 1958	January 13, 1961	2 years, 203 days		Dwight D. Eisenhower (1953–1961)
5		Mac Bundy	January 20, 1961	February 28, 1966	5 years, 39 days		John F. Kennedy (1961–1963)
5		Mac Bundy	January 20, 1961	February 28, 1966	5 years, 39 days		Lyndon B. Johnson (1963–1969)
6		Walt Rostow	April 1, 1966	January 20, 1969	2 years, 294 days		Lyndon B. Johnson (1963–1969)
7		Henry Kissinger	January 20, 1969	November 3, 1975	6 years, 287 days		Richard Nixon (1969–1974)
7		Henry Kissinger	January 20, 1969	November 3, 1975	6 years, 287 days		Gerald Ford (1974–1977)
8		Brent Scowcroft	November 3, 1975	January 20, 1977	1 year, 78 days		Gerald Ford (1974–1977)
9		Zbig Brzezinski	January 20, 1977	January 20, 1981	4 years, 0 days		Jimmy Carter (1977–1981)
10		Richard Allen	January 21, 1981	January 4, 1982	348 days		Ronald Reagan (1981–1989)
–		James Nance; Acting	November 30, 1981	January 4, 1982	35 days		Ronald Reagan (1981–1989)
11		William Clark	January 4, 1982	October 17, 1983	1 year, 286 days		Ronald Reagan (1981–1989)
12		Bud McFarlane	October 17, 1983	December 4, 1985	2 years, 48 days		Ronald Reagan (1981–1989)
13		John Poindexter	December 4, 1985	November 25, 1986	356 days		Ronald Reagan (1981–1989)
–		Alton Keel; Acting	November 26, 1986	December 31, 1986	35 days		Ronald Reagan (1981–1989)
14		Frank Carlucci	January 1, 1987	November 23, 1987	326 days		Ronald Reagan (1981–1989)
15		Colin Powell	November 23, 1987	January 20, 1989	1 year, 58 days		Ronald Reagan (1981–1989)
16		Brent Scowcroft	January 20, 1989	January 20, 1993	4 years, 0 days		George H. W. Bush (1989–1993)
17		Tony Lake	January 20, 1993	March 14, 1997	4 years, 53 days		Bill Clinton (1993–2001)
18		Sandy Berger	March 14, 1997	January 20, 2001	3 years, 312 days		Bill Clinton (1993–2001)
19		Condoleezza Rice	January 20, 2001	January 25, 2005	4 years, 5 days		George W. Bush (2001–2009)
20		Stephen Hadley	January 26, 2005	January 20, 2009	3 years, 360 days		George W. Bush (2001–2009)
21		James Jones	January 20, 2009	October 8, 2010	1 year, 261 days		Barack Obama (2009–2017)
22		Tom Donilon	October 8, 2010	July 1, 2013	2 years, 266 days		Barack Obama (2009–2017)
23		Susan Rice	July 1, 2013	January 20, 2017	3 years, 203 days		Barack Obama (2009–2017)
24		Michael Flynn	January 20, 2017	February 13, 2017	24 days		Donald Trump (2017–2021)
–		Keith Kellogg; Acting	February 13, 2017	February 20, 2017	7 days		Donald Trump (2017–2021)
25		H. R. McMaster	February 20, 2017	April 9, 2018	1 year, 48 days		Donald Trump (2017–2021)
26		John Bolton	April 9, 2018	September 10, 2019	1 year, 154 days		Donald Trump (2017–2021)
–		Charlie Kupperman; Acting	September 10, 2019	September 18, 2019	8 days		Donald Trump (2017–2021)
27		Robert O'Brien	September 18, 2019	January 20, 2021	1 year, 124 days		Donald Trump (2017–2021)
28		Jake Sullivan	January 20, 2021	January 20, 2025	4 years, 0 days		Joe Biden (2021–2025)
29		Mike Waltz	January 20, 2025	May 1, 2025	101 days		Donald Trump (2025–present)
30		Marco Rubio	May 1, 2025	September 22, 2026	1 year, 144 days		Donald Trump (2025–present)
30		Marco Rubio	September 22, 2026	Incumbent	55 days		Donald Trump (2025–present)

== See also ==
- White House Chief of Staff
- Homeland Security Council
- Homeland Security Advisor
