= Richard V. Allen =

US National Security Advisor (1936–2024)

Richard Allen
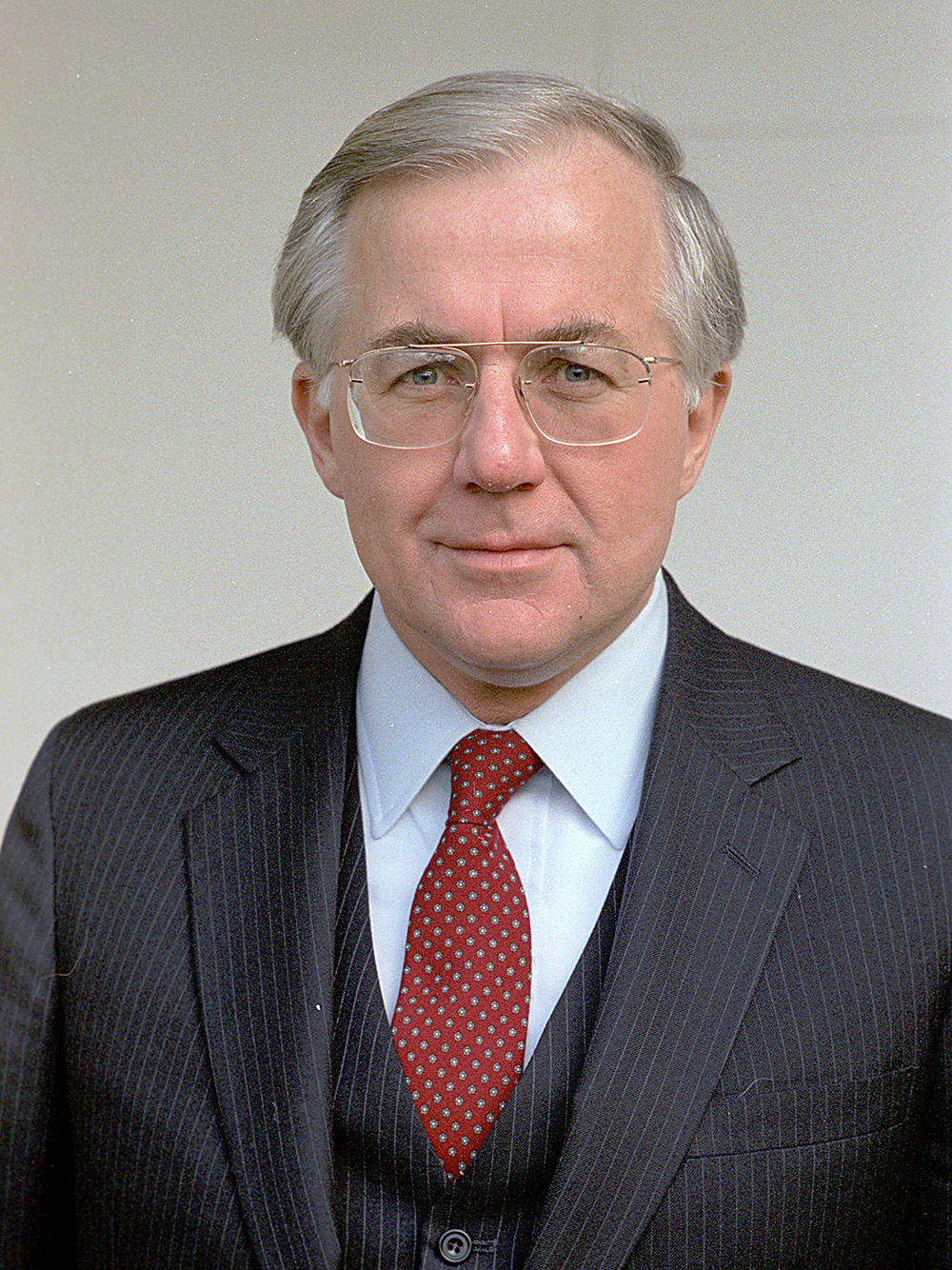
- Official portrait, 1981

10th United States National Security Advisor
- In office January 21, 1981 – January 4, 1982
- President: Ronald Reagan
- Deputy: James W. Nance
- Preceded by: Zbigniew Brzezinski
- Succeeded by: William P. Clark Jr.

5th United States Deputy National Security Advisor
- In office 1969
- President: Richard Nixon
- Preceded by: Francis M. Bator
- Succeeded by: Alexander Haig

Personal details
- Born: Richard Vincent Allen; January 1, 1936 Collingswood, New Jersey, U.S.
- Died: November 16, 2024 (aged 88) Denver, Colorado, U.S.
- Party: Republican
- Spouse: Patricia Mason (m. 1957)
- Children: 7
- Education: University of Notre Dame (BA, MA)

Richard Vincent Allen (January 1, 1936 – November 16, 2024) was the United States National Security Advisor under President Ronald Reagan from 1981 to 1982. In 1977, prior to Reagan's presidential election in November 1980, he served as Reagan's chief foreign policy advisor. Afterwards, he became a fellow at the Hoover Institution. He was a member of the Defense Policy Board Advisory Committee.

== Early life and education ==
Allen was born in Collingswood, New Jersey, on January 1, 1936, the son of Magdalen (Buchman) and Charles Carroll Allen. A graduate of Saint Francis Preparatory School in Spring Grove, Pennsylvania, Allen received his B.A. and M.A degrees from the University of Notre Dame. His M.A. from Notre Dame is in political science.

== Career ==
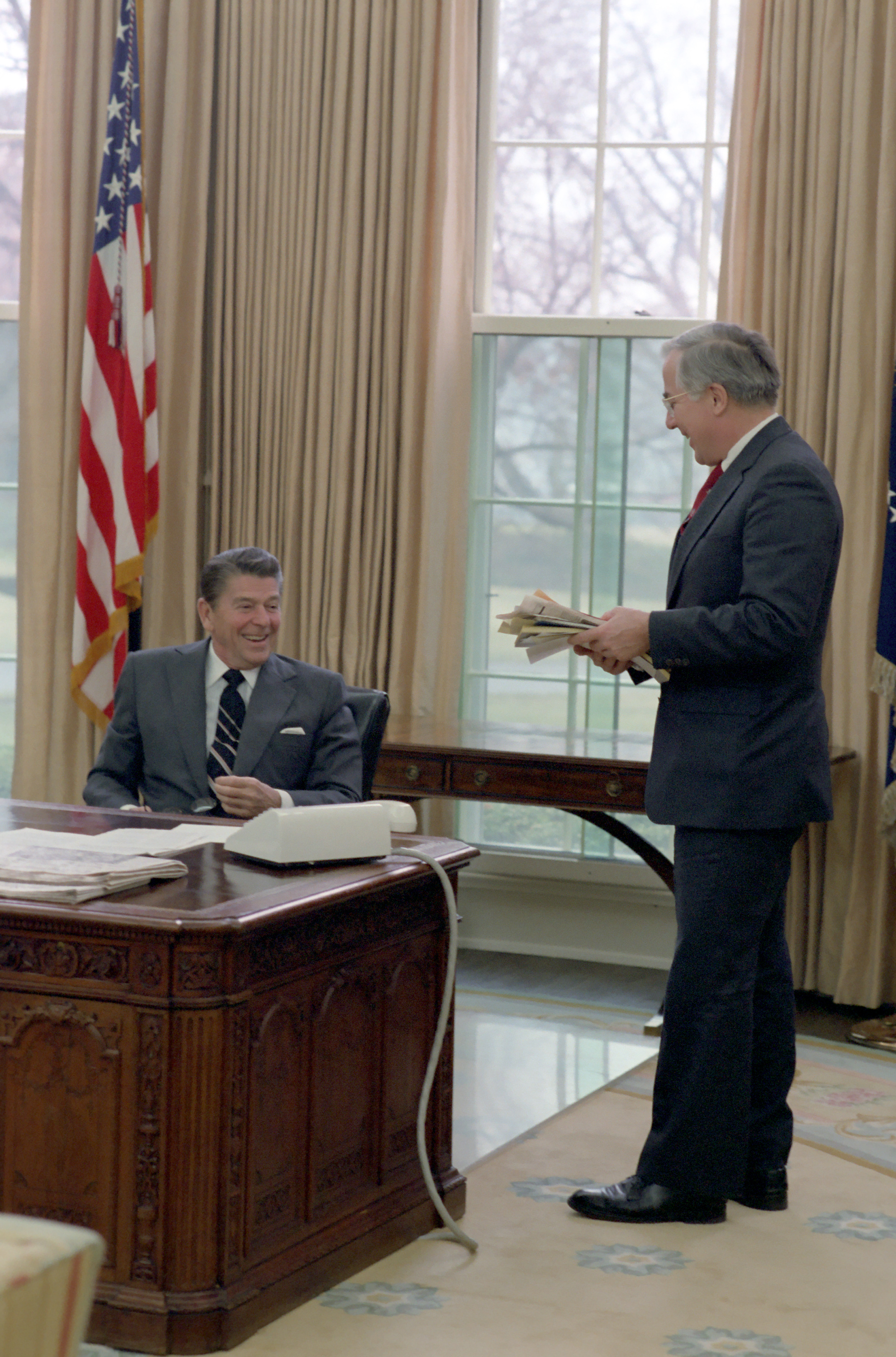
Allen and President Ronald Reagan in the Oval Office on January 21, 1981

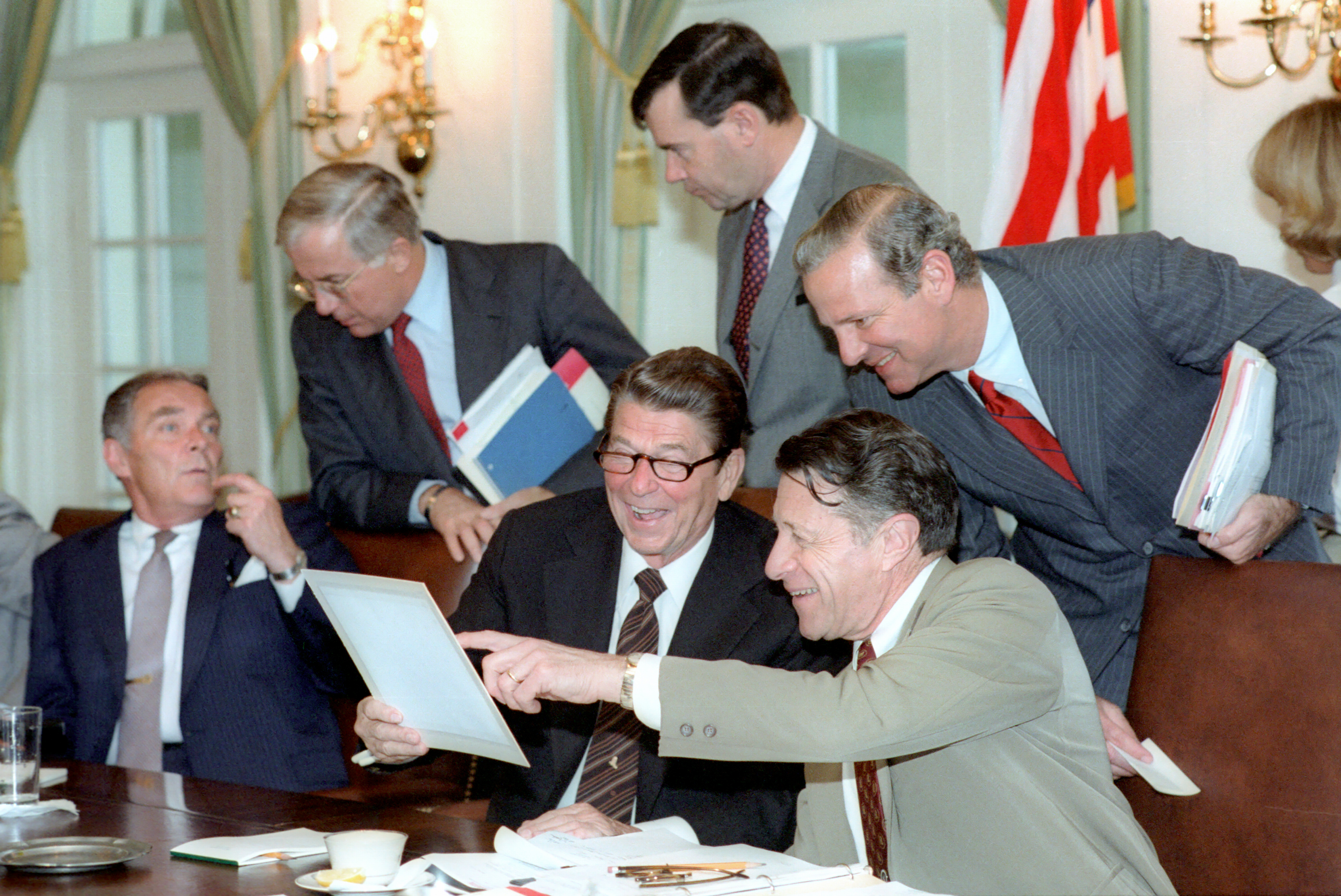
Allen (standing on left) with Reagan and other Reagan administration cabinet members in the White House in May 1981

From 1962 to 1966, Allen worked at the Center for Strategic and International Studies. He then joined the Hoover Institution as a senior staff member of from 1966 to 1968, when he left to become foreign policy coordinator to Richard Nixon. He served twice in the Nixon White House. He was then Ronald Reagan's chief foreign policy advisor from 1977 to 1980, before being appointed Reagan's first National Security Advisor.

In July 2000, Allen wrote an article for The New York Times, detailing his role in the recruitment of George H. W. Bush to be Reagan's vice president.

=== National Security Advisor (1981–1982) ===
In November 1981, while serving as Reagan's National Security Advisor, Allen was accused of receiving a bribe from a Japanese journalist for setting up an interview in January 1981 with First Lady Nancy Reagan. The Japanese magazine gave cash gifts to people that it interviewed, and that Allen had stepped in to intercept the check to avoid embarrassment for Nancy Reagan, then gave the check to his secretary, who put it in an office safe. When Allen changed offices, the check was found left in the safe. The FBI cleared everyone involved, and then the Justice Department began its own investigation, and the story was leaked to the press.

Reagan believed that political sabotage was behind the leaking of the story. A classified U.S. government source later revealed that Allen and his Potomac Associates partners were caught soliciting bribes, paid as "consulting fees" from Japanese corporations. Japanese security operations reported the crime to the U.S. Embassy in Tokyo and requested the U.S. government quietly handle the removal. Although the claims were never proven, Allen was pressured to take a leave of absence. On January 4, 1982, he resigned and his position was filled by his deputy, James W. Nance.

In 1981, Allen said that an unidentified third country, possibly Canada, had passed on an offer of 50 Vietnam War POWs in return for $4 billion. In lengthy, closed-door testimony under oath to committee investigators on June 23, 1992, he generally confirmed Hanoi's 1981 offer. Allen was asked by a committee staffer, "Soon after taking office, did the Reagan administration become involved in an offer made by the Vietnamese government for the return of live prisoners of war, if you can recall?"

Allen responded, "This $4 billion figure sticks in my mind, and I remember writing something—I don't know whether it was during a meeting with the president or to him—saying that it would be worth the president's going along and let's have the negotiation…"

Then Allen was asked, "Do you recall whether the $4 billion was for live American prisoners? To which he replied, "Yes, I do if it was $4 billion, it was indeed for live prisoners." When asked how many POWs he believed were still being held, he replied, "Dozens, hundreds." He later recanted and no other official has supported the statement in public.

=== Post-Reagan administration career ===
Allen became a senior fellow at Stanford University's Hoover Institution, and a member of The Heritage Foundation's Asian Studies Center Advisory Council, the Council on Foreign Relations, the United States Defense Policy Board, the American Alternative Foundation, and the United States National Security Advisory Group. He also served on the advisory council of the Nixon Center.

Allen was president of the Richard V. Allen Company, a Washington D.C.-based consulting services firm. He provided consulting services to international companies and organizations. He served on APCO Worldwide's Iraq reconstruction task force and is considered one of the most influential lobbyists in Washington, D.C. for South Korea's interests.

Allen was also a fellow of St Margaret's College, Otago, a residential college in New Zealand.

== Personal life and death ==
In 1957, Allen married Patricia Ann Mason, and they had seven children. In later years, Allen divided his time between Denver, Colorado, and Long Beach Island, New Jersey. He died at a Denver hospital on November 16, 2024, at the age of 88.

== Books ==
- Allen, Richard V. (1966). Peace and Peaceful Coexistence. Chicago: American Bar Association, 1966.
- Allen, Richard V. (1967). Communism and Democracy: Theory and Action. Princeton: Van Nostrand, 1967.
- Allen, Richard V. (1969). Yearbook On International Communist Affairs 1968. Hoover Institution Press. ISBN 0-8179-1801-9.

Political offices
Preceded by Francis Bator	Deputy National Security Advisor; 1969	Succeeded by Alexander Haig
Preceded by Zbigniew Brzezinski	National Security Advisor; 1981–1982	Succeeded by William Clark
