= Lussier River =

Coordinates: 50°8′6.82″N 115°34′36.90″W

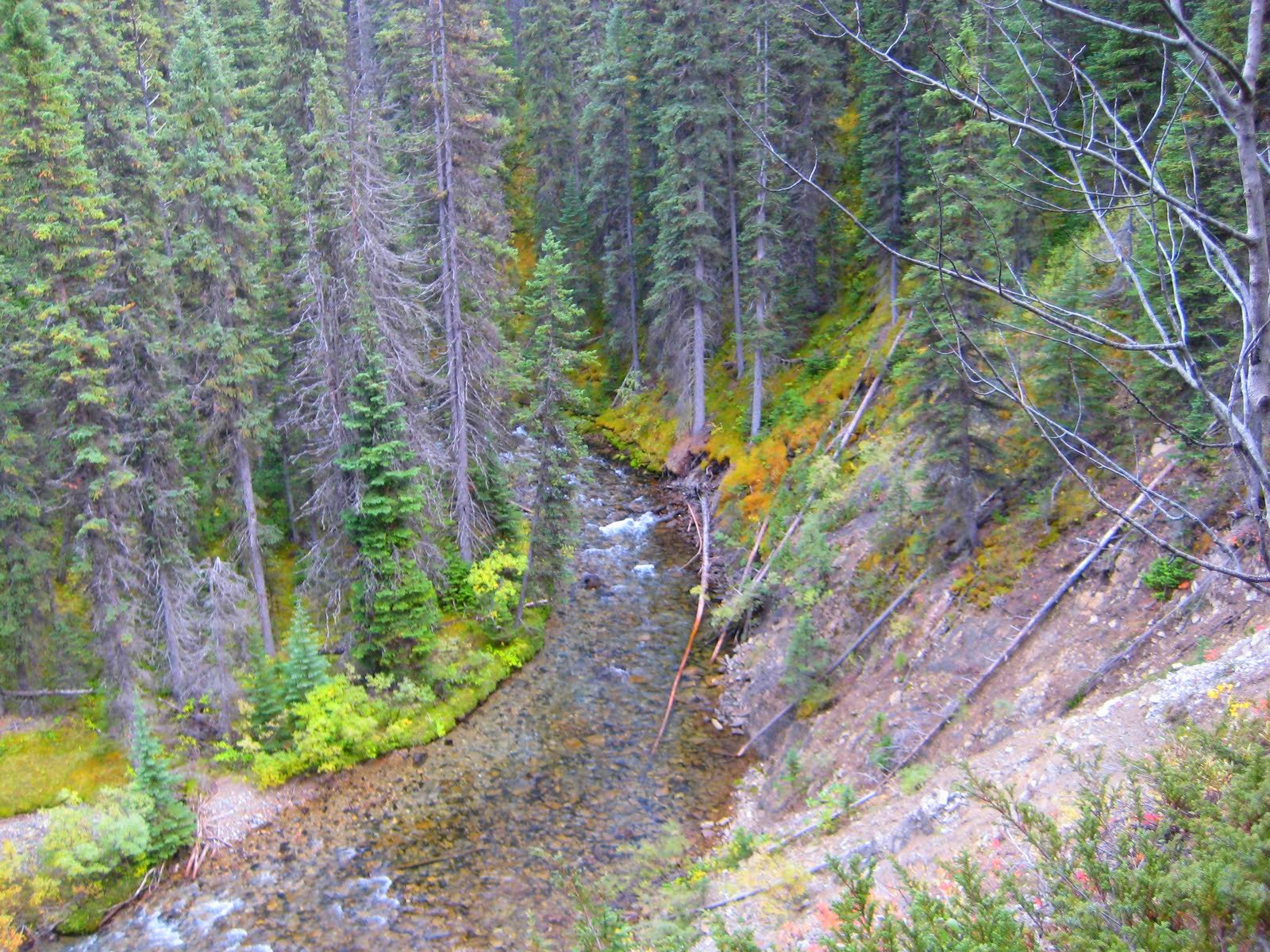
- Lussier River in Top of the World Provincial Park

Location
- Country: Canada
- Province: British Columbia
- District: Kootenay Land District

Physical characteristics
- Mouth: Kootenay River

The Lussier River is a tributary of the Kootenay River in the Canadian province of British Columbia. It is part of the Columbia River basin, as the Kootenay River is a tributary of the Columbia River.

It was named by David Thompson in 1808 after one of his men who had lost his kit in the Moyie River.

== Course ==
The Lussier River originates in Top of the World Provincial Park. It flows north to Whiteswan Lake Provincial Park, by Lussier Hot Springs, then south, joining the Kootenay River at Skookumchuck.

== See also ==
- List of rivers of British Columbia
- Tributaries of the Columbia River
