= Lucier (restaurant) =

Defunct restaurant in Portland, Oregon

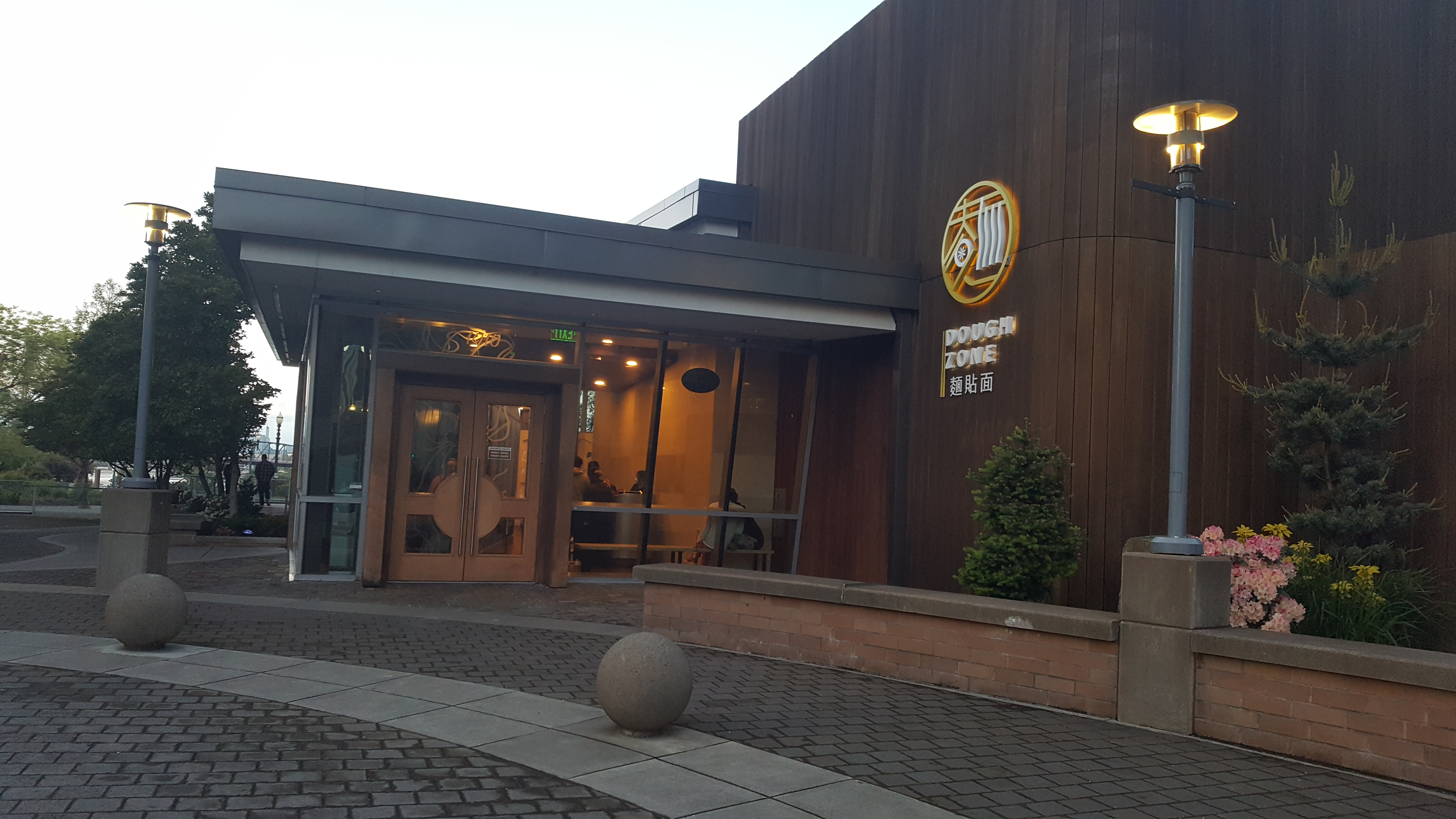
- Lucier occupied the space which later housed Dough Zone (pictured in 2022)
- Interactive map of Lucier

Restaurant information
- Established: May 2008
- Closed: December 2008
- Owners: Chris and Tyanne Dussin of the Dussin Group; Pascal Chureau
- Chef: Pascal Chureau
- Food type: European
- Location: 1910 South River Drive, Portland, Multnomah, Oregon, 97201, United States
- Coordinates: 45°30′29.5″N 122°40′21″W
- Seating capacity: 100

Lucier was a restaurant in Portland, Oregon, that specialized in European cuisine. The business, which was described as "the most opulent restaurant space in Portland history", only operated for seven months in 2008. News outlets described the failed venture as "the most colossal faceplant in Portland dining history" and the city's "greatest restaurant boondoggle". Lucier was the only restaurant in Oregon that the American Automobile Association awarded with four diamonds.

== Description ==
Lucier was a restaurant located at RiverPlace in South Portland's South Waterfront district. Martin Cizmar of Willamette Week described Lucier as "the most opulent restaurant space in Portland history". The Oregonian said the "ultra-contemporary showpiece" restaurant was named after French-Canadian fur trader Étienne Lucier.

The Oregonian's Michael Russell said Lucier was housed in a "prow-like building" with cantilevered windows and views of the Willamette River. The 7,600-square-foot (710 m^{2}) interior had "one-of-a-kind features", including "a marble wall milled with abstract swimming designs", a "shimmering" canal that was also described as a lazy river and water channel lined with iridescent gold tiles, and "oversized chandeliers made from bronze tubes of varying heights". According to Christina Melander of The Oregonian, Lucier had African hardwoods, custom-leather furniture made in Italy, and a "brigade-style" kitchen. The restaurant had silver front doors, twenty glass sculptures by Dale Chihuly, leather-padded bathroom walls, and a bar "capped by a gold dome designed to resemble the sun".

The dining room accommodated approximately 100 people. Lucier offered free valet parking.

=== Menu ===
The menu included modern European cuisine and, according to The Oregonian, "[encouraged] diners to create their own three, four or five course tasting menus—mixing and matching entrees and starters at will". The newspaper said:

Menus comprise a la carte, bar and a seven-course chef's tasting menu that emphasizes a few ingredients—tomatoes and the red mullet fish rouget, for example—throughout the entire meal. To encourage diners to try luxury items like Kobe beef and live scallops in the shell, the kitchen will prepare them in tiny portions, coupling, say, an ounce of Wagyu beef with a New York steak to demonstrate the difference.

Lucier's executive chef said the food "[pulled] flavors from Morocco, Italy and Portugal as well as from France, and [borrowed] techniques from Japan". The foie gras had coconut foam, macadamia nut "glass" similar to brittle, and a piece of pineapple. The halibut was prepared sous vide. The striped bass carpaccio had yuzu, olives, and currants. A dish called The Egg was a "lightly scrambled duck egg served in its shell topped with sevruga caviar and accompanied by teardrop-shaped brioche toasts". The butter-poached lamb was served with sweetbreads, pea shoots and fingerling potatoes.

The wine list had 1,600 labels. Two-hundred Champagnes were available by the glass.

== History ==
Lucier opened in May 2008 in a building that was owned by Onder Development. Alvarez + Brock oversaw a $4 million design. Spouses Chris and Tyanne Dussin of the Dussin Group were co-owners of Lucier. Food writer Karen Brooks of The Oregonian said the duo "banked on a dramatic river view, a theatrical menu, a wine list with world-class aspirations and price tags bound to make value-loving Portlanders flinch".

Pascal Chureau was a co-owner and executive chef. Top Chef: Boston contestants Doug Adams and Jeremy Niehuss were chefs at Lucier. Kristen D. Murray, who later opened a restaurant named Maurice, was a pastry chef. Prior to opening Ox, Gregory and Gabrielle Quinonez were cooks at Lucier.

The Oregonian's Christina Melander said Lucier was Portland's most-expensive restaurant, as of September–October 2008.

=== Closure ===
Lucier closed in December 2008 after operating for seven months. Chris Dussin attributed the closure to the Great Recession.

Willamette Week called the restaurant's short lifespan "the most colossal faceplant in Portland dining history" and Portland Business Journal called the venture a "failure". Michael Russell of The Oregonian said Lucier was "Portland's greatest restaurant boondoggle", the city's "most spectacular restaurant failure" and "most notorious flop", and a "doomed extravagance". Ted Sickinger called the restaurant an "extravaganza that became the most spectacular flameout in the pantheon of Portland eateries", and David Sarasohn called Lucier a "super-expensive flop" and "a monument to odd thinking and worse timing". Gregory Denton said the closure was "a low point in [his] career" and "a considerable blow to the ego and a huge disappointment after all the work that we had put into" Lucier.

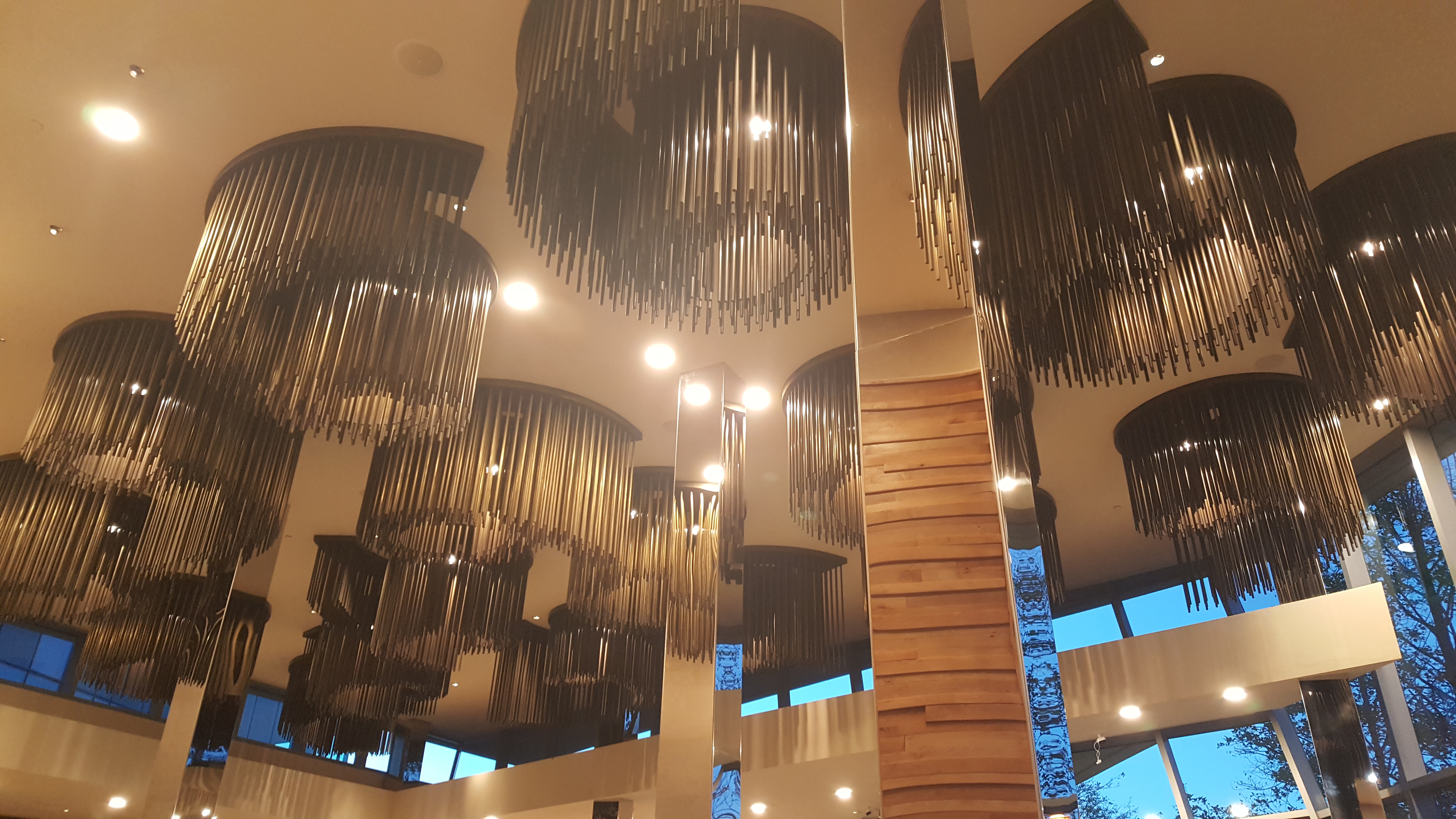
The interior chandeliers in Dough Zone (pictured in 2022) are remnants of Lucier's $4 million design

In early 2010, news outlets reported on a possible reopening of Lucier. Eater Portland's Eva Hagberg wrote; "Word is Dussin (perhaps having learned from his mistakes?) will, instead, be making the place 'little less high-end and a little more approachable' ". The Oregonian said "Changes in decor consistent with Lucier's downscaling will also be made". Eater Portland reported on Lucier's possible acquisition by San Francisco-based Lark Creek Restaurant Group. The Dussin Group put its lease on the venue on the market in October 2011. Keeler Hospitality Group signed a sublease in 2012 and the Dussin Group continued to pay "part of the original lease's five-figure monthly rent".

The space that had housed Lucier remained unoccupied until 2013. The restaurant was replaced by Quartet and later by Dough Zone.

== Reception ==
Lucier was the only restaurant in Oregon the American Automobile Association awarded four diamonds. Writing for the San Francisco Examiner, Lisa Zimmerman described it as Portland's "most notable restaurant new comer", and praised the architecture and service while questioning the food-and-wine pairings. Wendy Culverwell of Portland Business Journal wrote: "Lucier Restaurant opened and closed so quickly in 2008 that many people never had a chance to see its stunning setting". Fred Armstrong of Oregon Wine Press said Lucier "seemed better suited to Manhattan than Portland". Chef Pascal Chureau said criticism of the restaurant was "unfair".

=== The Oregonian ===
In June 2008, Michael C. Zusman of The Oregonian wrote: "Lucier at RiverPlace is the most elegantly appointed restaurant to open in Portland in decades, if not ever." He disliked the foie gras, which he said "[showed] an early tendency toward creativity for creativity's sake, rather than putting clean and clear flavors first". Zusman said the halibut was "inexplicably dry", and complimented The Egg, the striped bass carpaccio, and the butter-poached lamb. His review ended: "Clearly, Lucier is a place to watch".

In August 2008, the newspaper's Gerry Frank wrote:

In what is arguably one of the most dramatic and attractive restaurant settings in inland Oregon, visitors to Lucier will have quite an experience. Co-owners Tyanne and Chris Dussin and executive chef and co-owner Pascal Chureau have created a magnificent room filled with gorgeous glass art pieces crowned with a striking Willamette River view. Sophisticated diners will find the menu appealing and the food delicious; meat-and-potato types may not be so enthralled. With soaring prices (the tasting menu peaks at $100) and over-the-top pretentious service, it's yet to be determined whether this venue will be more than a one-time destination.

In November 2008, the newspaper's Sara Perry called Lucier a "stunning and sophisticated ... restaurant that's capturing the attention of people who want to celebrate and dine in style". Karen Brooks gave the restaurant a rating of C−. She wrote: "after four visits and a deep exploration of the menu, I'm sorry to say that the concept is about as viable as the auto industry: a money guzzler, out of touch and running on empty ideas". She called the cooking "gimmicky" and said "Lucier feels forced and artificial, like an American Express vision of privilege". She also wrote: "instead of a through-line of restrained elegance, we get Dining in Dubai, or 1980s Vegas, with fun-house mirror columns, display case after display case of gaudy blown glass and Sinatra belting out 'My Kind of Town' ". Her review ended: "Lucier neither improves on Portland nor feels of Portland. It doesn't even seem for Portland. It's like a spec house on the Street of Dreams, with all the upgrades but no one to answer the door."

A review published by The Oregonian in December 2008 said: "Portland's most expensive restaurant goes for the glitz on the waterfront but overreaches in style and substance, delivering only with first-rate desserts. ... Look for the simplest preparations—seasonal salads, roast duck, an aged rib-eye. All desserts are good, but don't miss the changing souffle, vacherin or mille-feuille offerings." The Oregonian said Lucier "never caught on. Reviews in Willamette Week, Portland Monthly and ... The Oregonian criticized the food and the prices the restaurant demanded".

In 2010, The Oregonian's Roger Porter called Chureau's tenure as Lucier's first executive chef "disastrous". He also called Lucier "the most overpriced and underwhelming restaurant in Portland's history, which closed to few regrets". In his 2016 overview of "97 long-gone Portland restaurants we wish were still around", Grant Butler wrote:

OK, this ridiculously extravagant waterfront restaurant may have been the biggest dining belly-flop in recent years, opening and closing in a matter of months in 2008. But those views of the Willamette! And those over-the-top Dale Chihuly sculptures, which were pretty magnificent when seen up close. The expensive food may have been a mess, but the desserts put pastry chef Kristen Murray on the map, and for that we are forever grateful.
