= Robert McFarlane (American government official) =

American Marine Corps officer and National Security Advisor (1937–2022)

Bud McFarlane
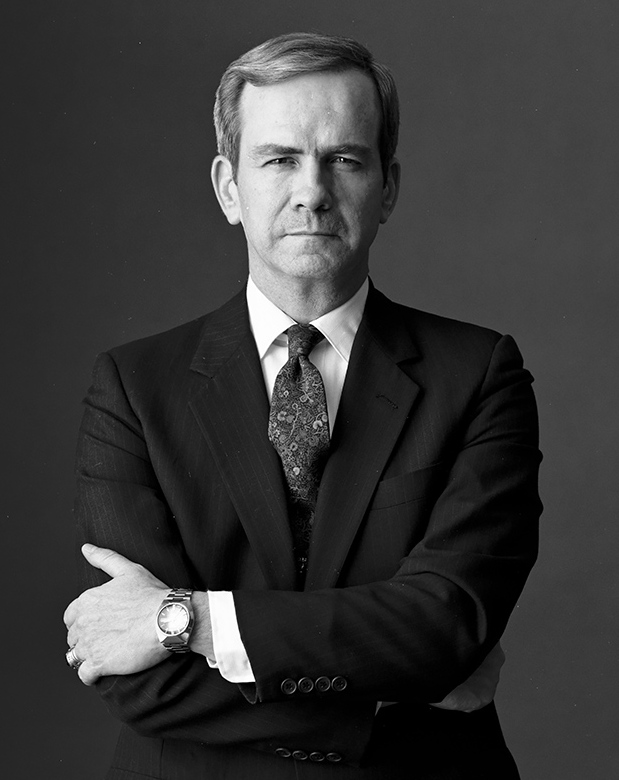
- Official portrait, 1983

12th United States National Security Advisor
- In office October 17, 1983 – December 4, 1985
- President: Ronald Reagan
- Preceded by: William P. Clark Jr.
- Succeeded by: John Poindexter

12th United States Deputy National Security Advisor
- In office April 4, 1982 – October 17, 1983
- President: Ronald Reagan
- Preceded by: James Nance
- Succeeded by: John Poindexter

20th Counselor of the Department of State
- In office February 28, 1981 – April 4, 1982
- President: Ronald Reagan
- Preceded by: Rozanne L. Ridgway
- Succeeded by: James L. Buckley

Personal details
- Born: Robert Carl McFarlane; July 12, 1937 Washington, D.C., U.S.
- Died: May 12, 2022 (aged 84) Lansing, Michigan, U.S.
- Party: Republican
- Spouse: Jonda Riley
- Education: United States Naval Academy (BS); Geneva Graduate Institute (MA); National Defense University (attended)

Military service
- Branch/service: United States Marine Corps
- Years of service: 1959–1979
- Rank: Lieutenant colonel
- Battles/wars: Vietnam War
- Awards: Navy Distinguished Service Medal; Bronze Star Medal (with valor); Meritorious Service Medal; Navy Commendation Medal (with valor); Secretary's Distinguished Service Award; Navy Distinguished Public Service Award

Robert Carl "Bud" McFarlane (July 12, 1937 – May 12, 2022) was an American Marine Corps officer who served as National Security Advisor to President Ronald Reagan from 1983 to 1985. Within the Reagan administration, McFarlane was a leading architect of the Strategic Defense Initiative, a project intended to defend the US from Soviet ballistic missile attacks. He resigned as National Security Adviser in late 1985 because of disagreements with other administration figures but remained involved in negotiations with Iran and with Hezbollah.

McFarlane was a central figure in the Iran–Contra affair, an operation in which the Reagan administration funneled weapons to Iran and diverted the profits to illegally fund right-wing rebels in Nicaragua. When the scheme came to light, administration officials implemented a plan to insulate Reagan and senior officials by focusing blame on McFarlane. He ultimately pleaded guilty to four misdemeanor counts and admitted that he had hidden information about the Reagan administration's support of the Contras from Congress. Suffering from guilt over his role in the scheme and feeling betrayed by Reagan, who, McFarlane later wrote, "approved every single action I ever took" but "lacked the moral conviction and intellectual courage to stand up in our defense and in defense of his policy," McFarlane attempted suicide in 1987. He was later pardoned, along with several other figures in the Iran-Contra scandal, by President George H. W. Bush shortly before he left office.

After his pardon, McFarlane operated a consulting business. He was investigated by the FBI in 2009 over concerns that he was illegally lobbying on behalf of the Sudanese government of Omar al-Bashir but was not charged with any crime. McFarlane died in Lansing, Michigan, on May 12, 2022, from a lung condition.

== Early life and education ==
McFarlane was the son of Texas Democratic Congressman William McFarlane. After graduating from Woodrow Wilson High School in Washington, D.C., McFarlane entered the United States Naval Academy at Annapolis in 1955, where he graduated in 1959. He was the third member of his family to attend the Academy, after his uncle Robert McFarlane (1925) and his brother Bill (1949). At the academy he graduated in the top 15 percent of the class and lettered twice in gymnastics. He received an honorary doctorate from the Institute of World Politics in Washington, D.C., in 2014. He sang in the Chapel Choir, and was a Brigade Administrative Officer and 14th Company Commander. He married his high school sweetheart, Jonda Riley.

== Marine Corps service ==
Following graduation from the Naval Academy in 1959, McFarlane was commissioned a second lieutenant in the Marine Corps, where he served as a field artillery officer.

As a Marine Corps officer, McFarlane commanded platoons, a battery of field artillery howitzers and was the Operations Officer for an artillery regiment. He taught Gunnery at the Army Advanced Artillery Course. He was the executive assistant to the Marine Corps' Operations Deputy from 1968–1971, preparing the deputy for meetings with the Joint Chiefs of Staff. During this assignment he was also the Action Officer in the Marine Corps Operations Division for Europe/NATO, the Middle East, and Latin America.

McFarlane served two combat tours in the Vietnam War. In March 1965, he commanded an artillery battery in the first landing of U.S. combat forces in Vietnam. While deployed during his first tour, McFarlane was selected for graduate studies as an Olmsted Scholar. McFarlane received a master's degree (License) in strategic studies with highest honors from the Graduate Institute of International Studies (Institut de Hautes Etudes Internationales, HEI) in Geneva, Switzerland.

After attending the Graduate Institute of International Studies, McFarlane returned to Vietnam for a second tour in 1967–1968 as a Regimental Fire Support Coordinator for the 3rd Marine Division deployed along the Vietnamese Demilitarized Zone during the Tet Offensive. He organized all fire support (B-52s, naval gunfire from the USS New Jersey (BB-62), and artillery) for forces deployed at Con Thien, Cam Lộ, Đông Hà, The Rockpile, Khe Sanh, and points between. McFarlane received a Bronze Star and a Navy Commendation Medal, both with Valor device.

Following his second tour in Vietnam and a tour at Headquarters Marine Corps, in 1971 he was named a White House Fellow. He was the first Marine Corps officer selected for the program.

McFarlane was assigned to the White House Office of Legislative Affairs and at the conclusion of that assignment was selected as the Military Assistant to Henry Kissinger at the National Security Council. In this post, McFarlane dealt with intelligence exchanges with the People's Republic of China from 1973 to 1976, giving detailed intelligence briefings to the PRC at the time of the Sino-Soviet split. He also accompanied Kissinger on his visits to the PRC. In addition, McFarlane dealt with other aspects of foreign policy, including the Middle East, relations with the Soviet Union, and arms control. McFarlane was appointed by President Gerald Ford as his Special Assistant for National Security Affairs while a Lieutenant Colonel and was awarded the Navy Distinguished Service Medal in 1976.

Upon leaving the White House, McFarlane was assigned to the National Defense University, where he co-authored a book on crisis management while concurrently receiving a diploma from the National War College.

He ended his Marine Corps career on Okinawa as Operations Officer for the 12th Marine Regiment. McFarlane retired in 1979 as a lieutenant colonel.

== Civilian posts ==
In 1979, McFarlane was appointed by U.S. Senator John Tower to the staff of the Senate Armed Services Committee, where he was responsible for staffing Senate consideration of the SALT II Treaty from 1979 to 1981. He also authored much of Ronald Reagan's foreign policy platform during the 1980 presidential campaign.

In 1981, President Reagan appointed and the Senate confirmed McFarlane as Counselor at the Department of State. In this post he assisted Secretary of State Alexander Haig.

In 1982, Reagan appointed McFarlane as Deputy National Security Advisor responsible for the integration of the policy recommendations of the Departments of State, Treasury, and Defense. In 1983, he was appointed by the president as his Special Representative in the Middle East responsible for Israeli-Arab negotiations.

McFarlane was criticized for having involved the United States armed forces in the Lebanon Civil War with gunship bombardment of Lebanese opposition forces which may have led to the 1983 Beirut barracks bombing where 241 American servicemen were killed.

Following that assignment, he returned to the White House and was appointed President Reagan's National Security Advisor. In that post, he was responsible for the development of U.S foreign and defense policy. He was a supporter of the Strategic Defense Initiative (SDI or "Star Wars").

== Iran-Contra affair and resignation ==
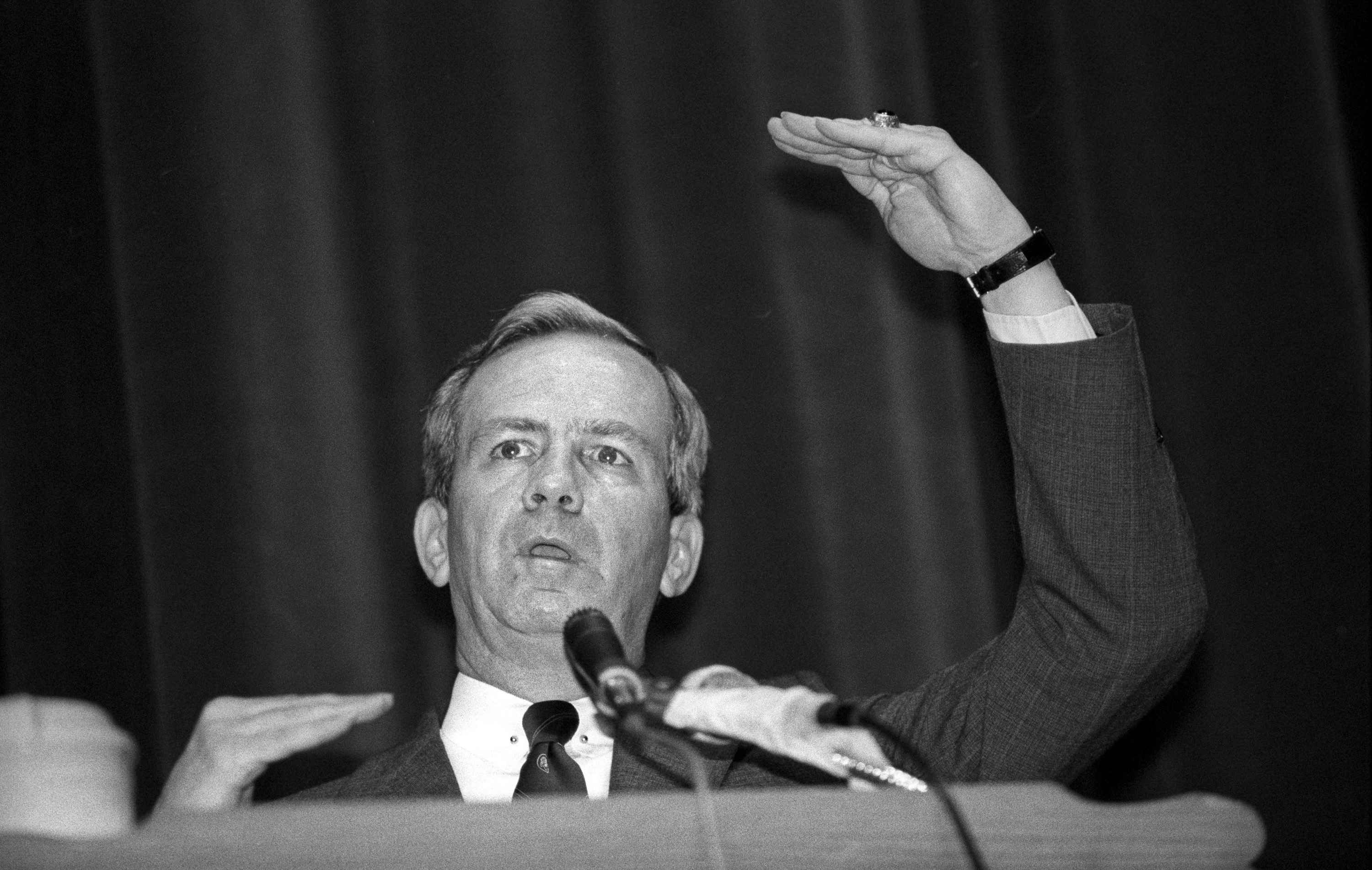
McFarlane in 1987

The Iran-Contra affair involved secretly selling arms to Iran and funneling the money to support the Contras in Nicaragua. As National Security Adviser, McFarlane urged Reagan to negotiate the arms deal with Iranian intermediaries, but McFarlane said that by late December 1985 he was urging Reagan to end the arms shipments. McFarlane resigned on December 4, 1985, citing that he wanted to spend more time with his family; he was replaced by Admiral John Poindexter.

The Iran-Contra affair came to light in November 1986 and a political scandal ensued. Disheartened, feeling abused by his former colleagues, and in depression over the embarrassment for the president that his actions had contributed to, McFarlane attempted suicide with an overdose of 25 to 30 valium tablets and was admitted into the hospital just two hours before his scheduled testimony before the Blue Ribbon panel appointed by President Reagan to investigate Iran-Contra known as the Tower Commission on February 9, 1987, saying he had failed his country.

In 1988, he pleaded guilty to four misdemeanor counts of withholding information from Congress as part of the Iran-Contra cover-up. He was sentenced to two years' probation and a $20,000 fine but was pardoned by President George H. W. Bush on Christmas Eve 1992.

== Other activities ==
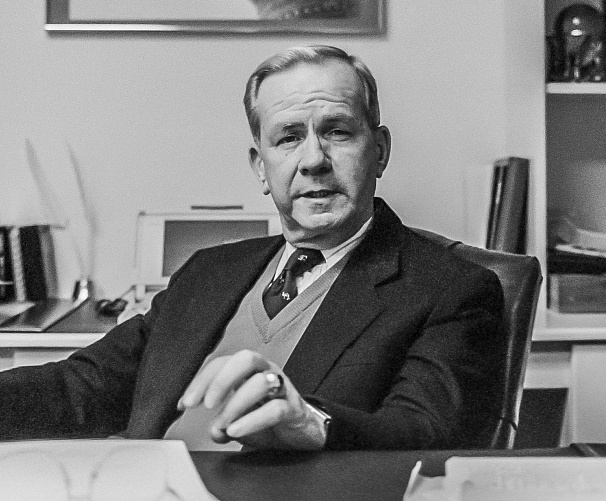
McFarlane in 1994

McFarlane co-founded and served as CEO of McFarlane Associates Inc., an international consulting company.

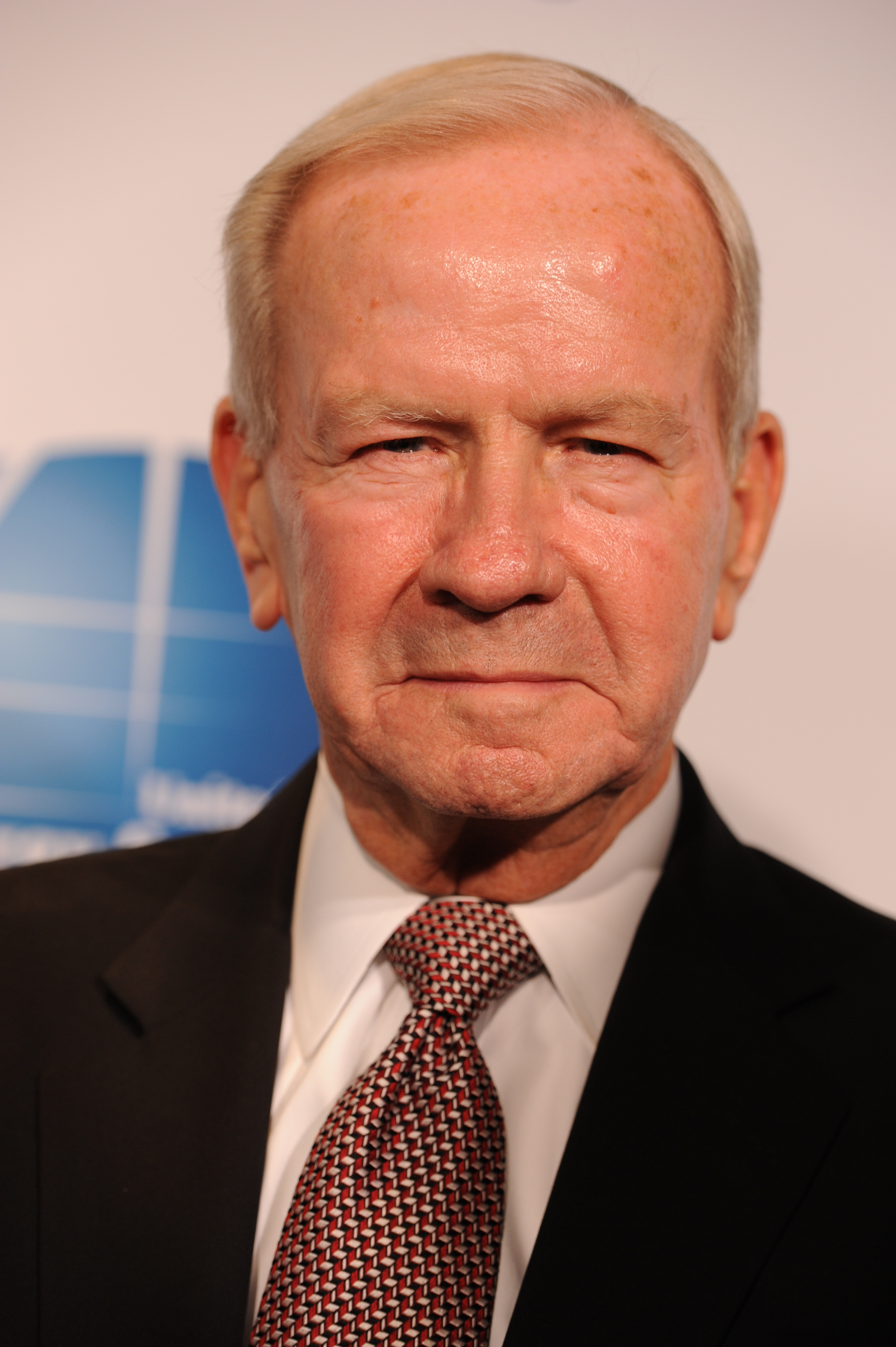
McFarlane in 2011

He was also a Co-founder and Director of IP3 International (short for "International Peace Power & Prosperity"), a consortium of firms wanting to build nuclear reactors in Saudi Arabia that is led by retired U.S. military commanders and former White House officials. Michael Flynn has described himself as an adviser to IP3, which the company denies. In May 2019, McFarlane wrote an op-ed in The Washington Times advocating for developing nuclear power generation in the Middle East titled "The New Imperialism". This proposal, dubbed "Middle East Marshall Plan" by its backers, was detailed in a March 2017 White Paper written by Tom Barrack, the chairman of Donald Trump's 2017 Presidential Inaugural Committee, a senior adviser to Trump's presidential campaign, and a long-time close friend of and fundraiser for Donald Trump. In 2021, McFarlane co-wrote with David Gattie a piece for The National Interest, titled, "China and the Importance of Civil Nuclear Energy," which extended his ideas on nuclear energy to the geopolitical outlook for China.

McFarlane was a member of the Washington Institute for Near East Policy (WINEP) Board of Advisors, was president of the Institute for the Analysis of Global Security, was on the Board of Advisors, and was a founding member of the Set America Free Coalition. He was also an Advisory Board member for the Partnership for a Secure America, a not-for-profit organization dedicated to recreating the bipartisan center in American national security and foreign policy.

McFarlane served on a number of boards including:

- Aegis Defence Services – Non-executive director
- Partnership for a Secure America – Advisory Board
- Fuel Freedom Foundation – Advisory Board
- Myriant Incorporated – Advisory Board
- Member of the Committee on the Present Danger
- Alphabet Energy – advisory board

He was an advisor to John McCain's 2008 presidential campaign. From 2009 on, McFarlane worked in the southern region of Sudan and Darfur on intertribal relations and development projects. On September 30, 2009, the Washington Post published a story suggesting that McFarlane's contract for this work, which was supported by the government of Qatar, was the result of a request by Sudanese officials. McFarlane denied any improper contact with Sudanese officials or efforts to avoid disclosure of his work. The Washington Post article reported that some persons involved in peacemaking efforts in the southern Sudan region questioned the source and helpfulness of McFarlane's activities. That article prompted FBI investigators to review McFarlane's activities in the Sudan. After an exhaustive probe that lasted three years and included search of his trash, email, and personal belongings, investigators concluded their search and did not file any criminal charges.

In July 2011, McFarlane, in cooperation with former CIA director Jim Woolsey, co-founded the United States Energy Security Council, sponsored by the Institute for the Analysis of Global Security.

== Death ==
McFarlane died on May 12, 2022, at a hospital in Lansing, Michigan, from complications of a lung condition at the age of 84. He lived in Washington, D.C., but was visiting family in Michigan at the time of his death. On July 27, 2022, the Congressional Record published, "Remembering the Honorable Robert C. "Bud" McFarlane," commemorating the respect he commanded around the world for his diverse leadership roles.

== Awards and decorations ==
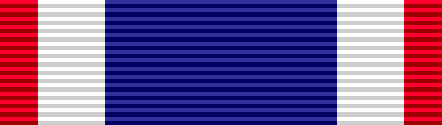
Navy Distinguished Service Medal
Bronze Star with Valor device
Meritorious Service Medal
Navy Commendation Medal with Valor device
Army Commendation Medal
Combat Action Ribbon
Secretary of State Distinguished Service Award
Secretary of the Navy Medal for Distinguished Public Service
Presidential Service Badge
Alfred Thayer Mahan Award for Literary Achievement (1979)
American-Swiss Friendship "Man of the Year" Award (1985)

== See also ==
- Iran–United States relations
- List of people pardoned or granted clemency by the president of the United States

== General and cited references ==
- "Complaint That Donald Regan May Be Placing Blame for the Iran Initiative on Robert McFarlane," Secret PROFS email (November 7, 1986). Original source: US National Security Council.
- Kornbluh, Peter and Malcolm Byrne, eds. The Iran-Contra Affair: The Making of a Scandal, 1983–1988 (Document collection). Alexandria, VA: Chadwyck-Healey; Washington, D.C.: National Security Archive, 1990.
- Kornbluh, Peter and Malcolm Byrne, eds. The Iran-Contra Scandal: The Declassified History. New York: New Press, Distributed by W. W. Norton, 1993.
- Walsh, Lawrence E. Firewall: The Iran-Contra Conspiracy and Cover-up. New York: Norton, 1997.
- Timberg, Robert, The Nightingale's Song. New York: Free Press, 1996.
- Ivo H. Daalder; James M. Lindsay; Robert C. "Bud" McFarlane; Carla Anne Robbins (panelists) (April 18, 2001). "Assessing the Bush Foreign Policy Transition" (PDF). Washington, D.C.: American Enterprise Institute. Archived from the original (PDF) on July 8, 2004.
- McFarlane, Robert C.; Smardz, Zofia (1994). Special Trust: Pride, Principle and Politics Inside the White House. New York: Cadell & Davies.

Political offices
Preceded by Rozanne L. Ridgway	Counselor of the Department of State; 1981–1982	Succeeded by James L. Buckley
Preceded by James Nance	Deputy National Security Advisor; 1982–1983	Succeeded by John Poindexter
Preceded by William Clark	National Security Advisor; 1983–1985	Succeeded by John Poindexter
