= James P. Lucier =

American author and United States Senate staff member

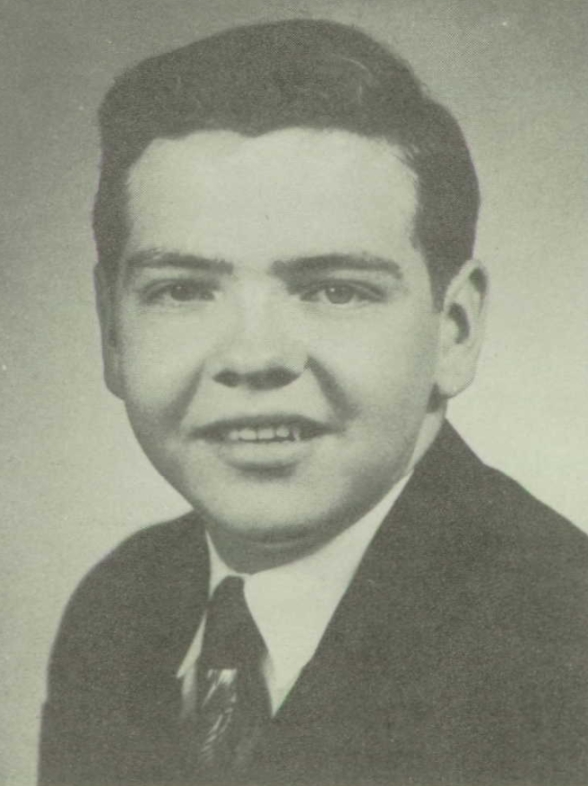
- Lucier, circa 1952
- Born: 1934 or 1935 (age 90–91); United States
- Education: University of Detroit Jesuit High School and Academy
- Alma mater: University of Detroit; University of Michigan
- Occupations: Author; U.S. Senate staff member
- Known for: Political writing
- Notable work: The Political Writings of James Monroe

James P. Lucier (born c. 1934) is an American author and a former staff member of the United States Senate.

== Biography ==
Lucier graduated from University of Detroit Jesuit High School and Academy and earned a bachelor's degree in radio and television journalism from the University of Detroit, where he co-founded the educational station WDET, and a doctoral degree in English literature from the University of Michigan.

After completing his doctorate, Lucier was associate editor of the Richmond News Leader, in Virginia; he caused controversy by writing critically of President John F. Kennedy shortly after his assassination. (Note: Per the cited source, "...Lucier wrote for the Richmond News Leaders [sic] in the early 1960s. Some journalists remember Lucier for inciting, by his own account, the biggest controversy in the paper's history by writing something derogatory about President Kennedy not long after he was assassinated." While not specified in the source, during the time that Lucier was the editorial writer for The Richmond News Leader, the paper published the editorial "A Time for Restraint" on December 9, 1963, commenting (in part) "...the confused thinking of some of the late President's admirers may yet fix upon the public mind a falsehood so monumental that it staggers the reasoning process.") Also in 1963, he wrote for American Opinion, the magazine of the right-wing John Birch Society, accusing African leaders of embracing socialism as "abundance without necessitating the earning of it".

Lucier was a United States Senate staff member for 25 years. After working for South Carolina Southern Democrat and later Republican Senator Strom Thurmond, he joined the staff of North Carolina Republican Senator Jesse Helms, initially as coordinator of domestic legislative policy, then as chief legislative aide for foreign affairs. Lucier became minority staff director for the Senate Foreign Relations Committee when Helms became its ranking minority member in February 1987. A leader of the hard-line faction among Republican staffers, he was relieved of his position in a general shake-up by Helms in 1992, being replaced by James "Bud" Nance, a retired admiral and a friend of Helms.

In 1972, Lucier established Capitol Information Services, which he worked for part-time at the beginning of his employment with Helms; in 1986, the Charlotte Observer raised questions about the ethics of a Senate aide running such a business. While working for Helms, Lucier and another aide to Helms, John Carbaugh, were criticized for profiting from private foundations they had set up with Helms, and were accused of meddling in foreign policy on Helms' behalf, particularly when both attended and attempted to influence the Lancaster House talks between Britain and Rhodesia.

Lucier subsequently became senior editor of the news weekly Insight, and also served as chairman of the advisory commission for the Thomas Balch Library, as a member of the board of the James Monroe Museum, and as a senior fellow of the Monroe Foundation.

In 2001, Lucier published The Political Writings of James Monroe, one of a series on presidential writings commissioned by the publisher. For his work on the book, he was appointed one of six scholars in the Congressional Reading Room at the Library of Congress.

In 2006, Lucier was appointed head of the Program on the Middle East and the Iran Information Center at the Institute on Religion and Public Policy.
