= Robert L. Schweitzer =

American Army general

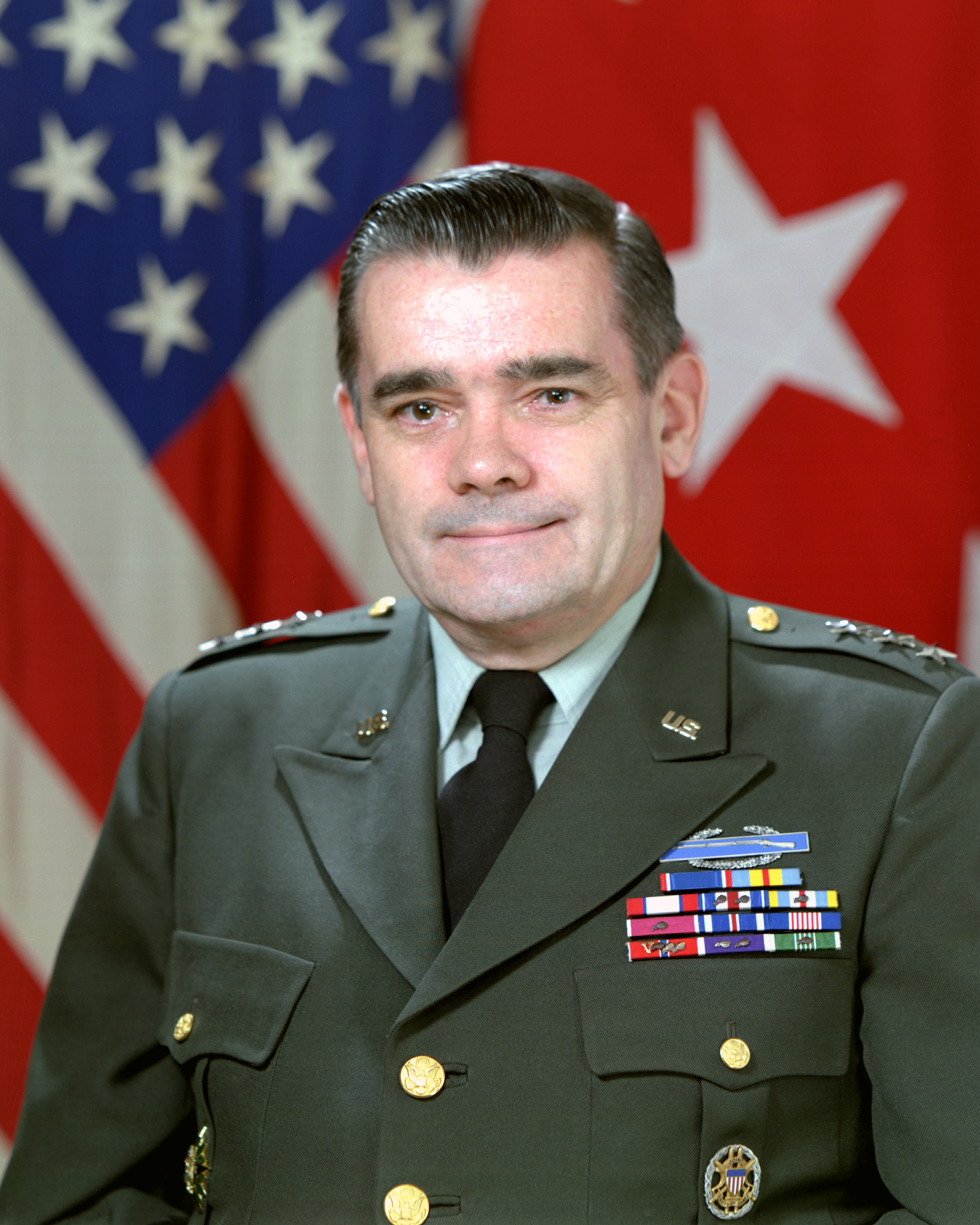
- Born: 6 September 1928; Chicago, Illinois, US
- Died: 16 September 2000 (aged 72); Washington, D.C., US
- Military career
- Allegiance: United States
- Branch: United States Army
- Service years: 1950–1987
- Rank: Lieutenant General
- Commands: 11th Armored Cavalry Regiment
- Conflicts: Vietnam War
- Awards: Distinguished Service Cross; Defense Distinguished Service Medal; Army Distinguished Service Medal; Silver Star Medal (3); Defense Superior Service Medal (2); Legion of Merit (2); Distinguished Flying Cross; Soldier's Medal; Bronze Star Medal (4); Purple Heart (7); Air Medal (21)

Robert Laurence Schweitzer (6 September 1928 – 16 September 2000) was a lieutenant general in the United States Army who served as Chairman of the Inter-American Defense Board from 1982 to 1987. He was awarded the Distinguished Service Cross for his actions while serving as lieutenant colonel in Vietnam in 1966.

== Early life and education ==
Born in Chicago, Schweitzer graduated from St. Ignatius High School in 1946. He enlisted in the Army in 1950 and graduated from Officer Candidate School in 1953. Schweitzer later completed a B.A. degree in civil government at the University of Maryland in 1962. Schweitzer also earned an M.S. degree in military arts and science from the Army Command and General Staff College and an M.A. degree in international relations from Georgetown University. He attended the Army War College and received an M.S. degree in counseling from Shippensburg State College.

== Military career ==
As an enlisted soldier, Schweitzer served during the Korean War but was not sent overseas. From 1 July 1952 to 27 October 1957, he was assigned to the Illinois Army National Guard before rejoining the Regular Army.

During the Vietnam War, Schweitzer was awarded the Distinguished Service Cross for his actions on 11 December 1966 during the defense of the village of Tam Da. Serving as an aerial observer for the 1st Infantry Division, he killed two Viet Cong insurgents near a concealed tunnel entrance. His pilot landed their helicopter and Schweitzer investigated the tunnel by himself, disabling four booby traps, killing two more insurgents, capturing a fifth one and recovering intelligence materials. During his six combat tours in Vietnam, he also received three Silver Star Medals, a Distinguished Flying Cross, four Bronze Star Medals, seven Purple Hearts, and 21 Air Medals.

Schweitzer served as deputy commander of the 11th Armored Cavalry Regiment in Vietnam and later served as commanding officer of the regiment in Europe. As a major general, he served on the National Security Council staff. At the beginning of the Reagan administration, he became the NSC's defense group director, the council's top military officer. However, in October 1981, he was relieved of that post following a speech he gave that was "at some degree of variance" with President Reagan's views. In the speech, he spoke of "drift toward war" with the Soviet Union, something that Reagan and other administration officials said they did not believe. After leaving the NSC, he returned to the Pentagon.

His other military honors include the Defense Distinguished Service Medal, the Army Distinguished Service Medal, two Defense Superior Service Medals, two awards of the Legion of Merit and the Soldier's Medal.

== Personal ==
Schweitzer had two sisters, Mary Nolan (nee Schweitzer) and Ruth Schweitzer.

Schweitzer married Nancy Jean Nolan on 3 August 1950. The couple had five sons and one daughter, but the marriage ended in divorce.

Schweitzer remarried with Marie Silvia "Marisa" Schweitzer (31 December 1931 – 30 July 2016) circa 1982 and the couple lived in Springfield, Virginia. After his death from cancer at Walter Reed Army Hospital, he was buried at Arlington National Cemetery on 22 September 2000. His second wife was interred with him on 15 November 2016.
