= Dough Zone =

Chinese restaurant chain

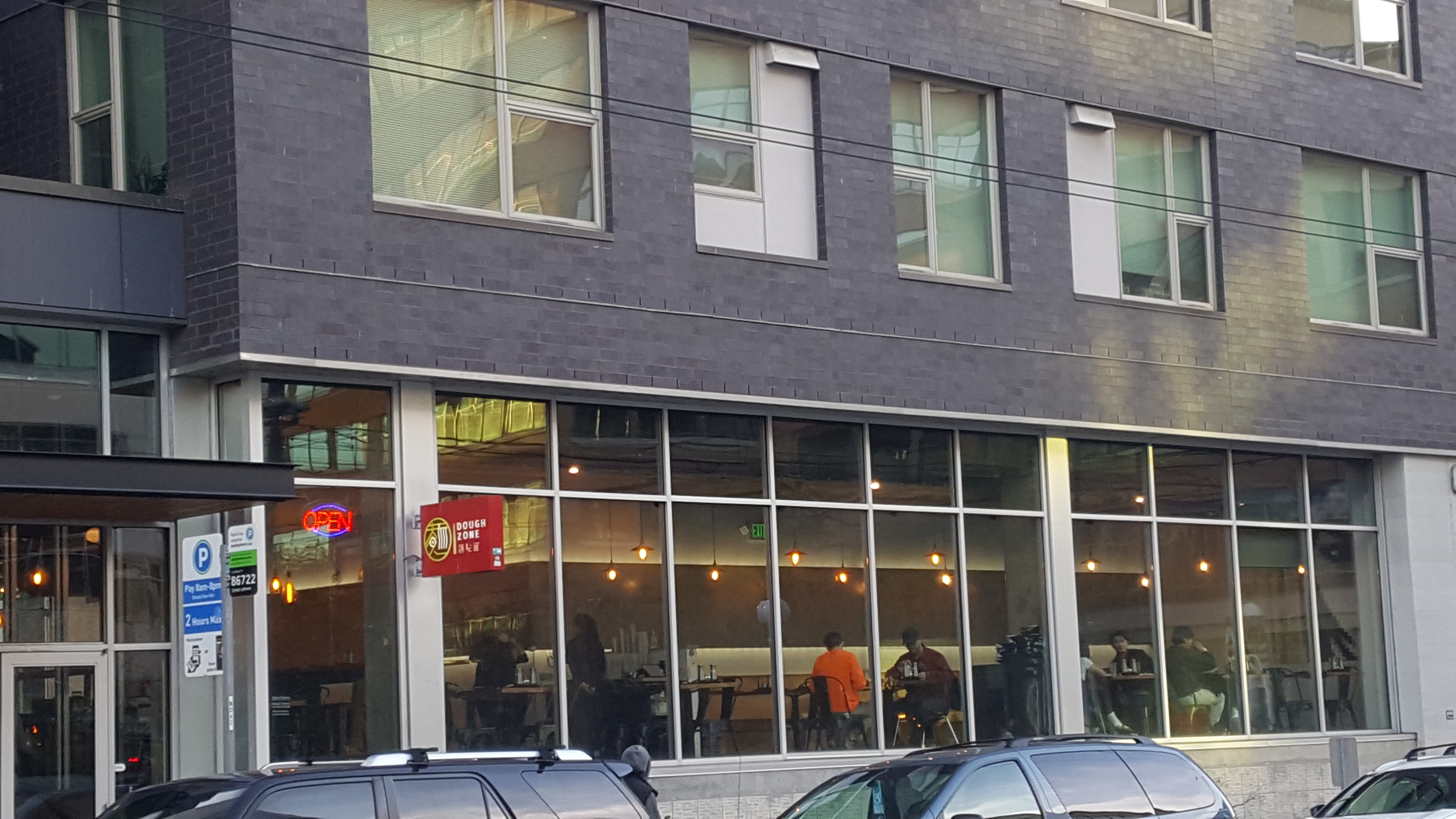
- Exterior of Seattle restaurant, 2022

Restaurant information
- Owners: Jason and Nancy Zhai
- Food type: Chinese
- Location: United States
- Website: doughzonedumplinghouse.com

Dough Zone (Chinese: 麺貼面) is an American chain of Chinese restaurants.

== History ==
Jason and Nancy Zhai opened the original restaurant in Bellevue, Washington, in 2014. There were seven restaurants in Washington and two locations in California, as of November 2021.

The business expanded into Portland, Oregon, in April 2022, followed by Beaverton in 2023. There are multiple locations in Seattle.

== Reception ==
Dough Zone was included in The Infatuation's 2025 list of the 25 best restaurants in Seattle's Chinatown–International District.

== See also ==
- List of Chinese restaurants
- List of restaurant chains in the United States
