= William P. Clark Jr. =

American judge and public servant (1931–2013)

William Clark
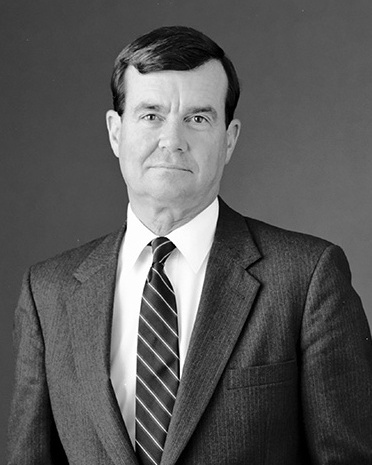
- Official portrait, 1983

44th United States Secretary of the Interior
- In office November 18, 1983 – February 7, 1985
- President: Ronald Reagan
- Preceded by: James G. Watt
- Succeeded by: Donald P. Hodel

11th United States National Security Advisor
- In office January 4, 1982 – October 17, 1983
- President: Ronald Reagan
- Preceded by: Richard V. Allen
- Succeeded by: Robert McFarlane

6th United States Deputy Secretary of State
- In office February 25, 1981 – February 9, 1982
- President: Ronald Reagan
- Preceded by: Warren Christopher
- Succeeded by: Walter Stoessel

Associate Justice of the California Supreme Court
- In office March 23, 1973 – February 25, 1981
- Appointed by: Ronald Reagan
- Preceded by: Raymond E. Peters
- Succeeded by: Allen Broussard

Personal details
- Born: William Patrick Clark Jr. October 23, 1931 Oxnard, California, U.S.
- Died: August 10, 2013 (aged 81) Shandon, California, U.S.
- Party: Republican
- Spouse: Johanna Brauner (m. 1955; died 2009)
- Children: 5
- Education: Stanford University (attended); Loyola Marymount University (attended)

William Patrick Clark Jr. (October 23, 1931 – August 10, 2013) was an American rancher, judge, and public servant who served under President Ronald Reagan as the deputy secretary of state from 1981 to 1982, United States national security advisor from 1982 to 1983, and the secretary of the interior from 1983 to 1985.

== Early life and education ==
Clark was born in Oxnard, California, on October 23, 1931, the son of William Petit and Bernice Gregory Clark.

Clark attended Villanova Preparatory School in Ojai. After completing high school, Clark went on to Stanford University and Loyola Law School while managing his ranch. Not being able to dedicate sufficient time and resources towards completing his undergraduate and postgraduate degrees, Clark never graduated from Stanford or Loyola. Nevertheless, he scored well enough on entrance exams to gain admittance to law school, and he passed the California state bar exam without a law school degree, after failing his first attempt at the California state bar exam. He also served in the U.S. Army Counter Intelligence Corps.

== Legal and government career ==
=== California ===
In the 1960s and 1970s, Clark held a series of public posts in state government. In September 1967, Clark became the Executive Secretary to Governor Ronald Reagan. Clark was a judge of the San Luis Obispo County Superior Court from 1969 to 1971, in Paso Robles. On July 30, 1971, Governor Reagan elevated Clark to Associate Justice of the California Court of Appeal, Second District, Division One. In January 1973, Governor Reagan appointed Clark as an associate justice of the California State Supreme Court, where he served from March 23, 1973, until February 25, 1981.

=== Washington, D.C. ===
In 1980, Ronald Reagan won the election as President of the United States. Clark reached the apex of his power when Reagan appointed Clark as National Security Advisor, and he temporarily became preeminent among presidential aides. A longtime rancher friend of Reagan, according to Edmund Morris's Dutch, Clark would walk into Reagan's office unannounced, an unheard-of practice for even the most senior officials. Clark even suggested to the president in light of foreign policy troubles bedeviling the United States in the mid-1980s that Reagan consider not running for reelection in 1984. By that time, however, George Shultz had surpassed Clark in influence, and Reagan apparently gave Clark's suggestion no thought.

Clark's biographers credit him with convincing Reagan that the Soviet Union could be pushed to the edge of collapse. The strategy was opposed by Secretary of State George Shultz, among others, leading to rancor in the White House.

Morris writes in his admitted semi-fictionalized narrative biography that Clark resigned in late 1983 when he tired of the "unceasing hostility of [Michael] Deaver, George Shultz, and Nancy Reagan." Morris described Clark as "the only man who ever got within a furlong of intimacy" with the notoriously distant Reagan, and his ability to relate to Reagan inspired jealousy, at the same time that Clark's taciturn nature made him unlikely to build allies.

A differing PBS account quotes Mike Deaver via his book "Nancy", pg. 48: "Staff might have resented my closeness with Nancy, but to my knowledge, it was never a problem. Bill Clark and Ed Meese, then the legal-affairs counsel, were happy to have me working closely with Nancy because that freed them up to concentrate on policy and appointments. Often, too they would use me as back door to the first lady, to get her input ..." The PBS "Role of a Lifetime" url also lists some support of a conflict with George Shultz: "I knew that I would have to insist on dealing directly with the president. I could not let the White House staff interpret me to him. That was especially true when it came to Clark, because his views and instincts were different from mine ..." Noted authority Lou Cannon concluded that "[Mrs. Reagan] was very much opposed to Bill Clark. She wanted him out of (the NSA position) because she felt that it was interfering with (President) Reagan's efforts to open up better relations with the Soviet Union." Fellow Reagan family biographer James Benze furthers in the commentary, "Nancy Reagan (then) enlists other moderates in the administration to make William Clark's life miserable as National Security Advisor."

On September 21, 1983, Secretary of the Interior James G. Watt embarrassed the administration by making bigoted remarks to the media, causing him to resign on November 8, and Clark requested and received an appointment to replace Watt.

=== Return to California ===
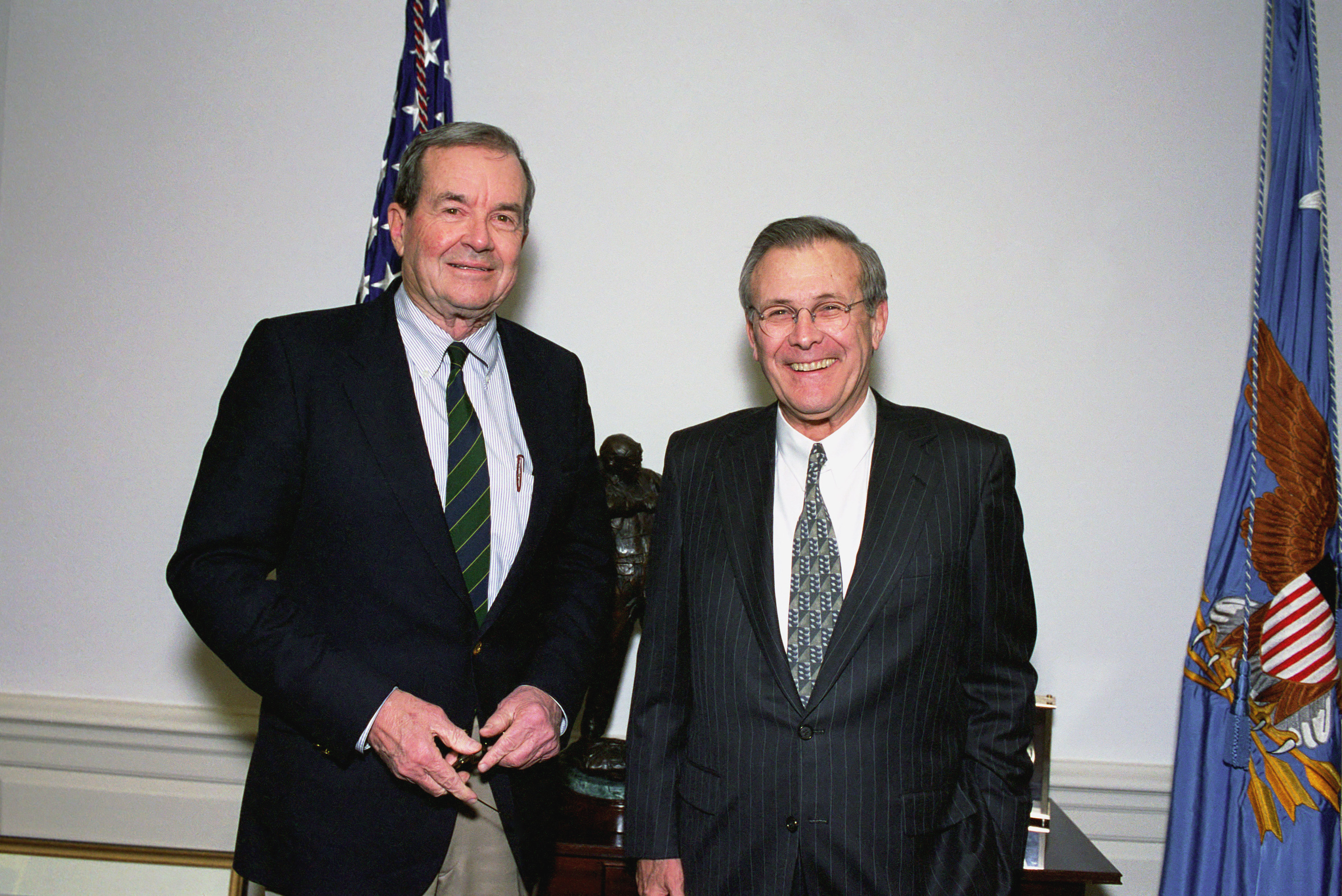
Clark with Defense Secretary Donald Rumsfeld in 2001

Clark returned to California after his stint serving the administration and pursued a variety of law firm and other business interests.

After the Iran-Contra hearings in Congress, Clark wrote privately to Reagan urging him to pardon his three aides who were threatened with indictments in the conspiracy: Oliver North, John Poindexter, and Robert McFarlane. Under President George H. W. Bush, Clark also orchestrated the lobbying campaign to obtain a pardon for his friend Caspar Weinberger.

In July 2011, Clark became a member of the United States Energy Security Council, which seeks to diminish oil's monopoly over the United States transportation sector and is sponsored by the Institute for the Analysis of Global Security.

=== Observations on national and international relations ===
As National Security Advisor for Ronald Reagan, Clark frequently consulted with and visited with the three living former presidents, Richard Nixon, Jimmy Carter, and Gerald Ford, leaving a briefing book with them on subjects important to them. For Nixon, it was on East-West Relations including the Soviet Union; for Carter, the Middle East, and for Ford, domestic matters. Consulting with predecessors, in the White House and in the Cabinets of either party, was important to Clark's and therefore, Reagan's success. "While I did not always agree with (former National Security Adviser and Secretary of State) Henry Kissinger's views on national security, I had a close relationship with him and would take his call any time of the day or night," Clark said. "Recognizing that the Reagan administration was serving at the height of the Cold War, I would get his opinions as well as other predecessors in national security–at the Pentagon, State Department and, of course, the White House."

Clark was dismayed at the tones of early 21st-century politics in the United States. "There was a lack of contentiousness between the two political parties that I'm afraid does not exist today," Clark said. "That's one of my worries about making government work — there seems to be far less camaraderie now than we've known in the past."

=== Retirement ===
Clark retired to his ranch near the rural community of Shandon, California, where he built a small chapel in the hills of his ranch. On August 10, 2013, Clark died of complications from Parkinson's disease at his home in Shandon, at age 81. He is interred at the Shandon Cemetery in Shandon, California.

== Philanthropy ==
In 1988, Clark was severely injured when he crashed his airplane on his ranch in Shandon, San Luis Obispo County, California. He was pulled from the wreck by Jesus Muñoz, his long-time ranch manager. In part due to his gratitude to God for his recovery, he and his family created a chapel on their ranch, and donated the Spanish ceiling of another to the Thomas Aquinas College library in Santa Paula, Ventura County. Each contains ceilings and other features from European buildings, purchased by Clark from the Hearst Corporation, via his close friend George Randolph Hearst Jr. The chapel in Shandon, known locally as Chapel Hill, is open to the public.

The auditorium at Villanova Preparatory School in Ojai, California, was named in honor of Judge Clark, as a distinguished alumnus and in recognition of his gifts to the school.

== Personal life ==
On May 5, 1955, Clark married the former Johanna M. "Joan" Brauner in Bern, Switzerland; they had five children. Joan Clark died in April 2009.

== Sources ==
- Paul Kengor and Patricia Clark Doerner (2007). The Judge: William P. Clark, Ronald Reagan's Top Hand. Ignatius Press.
- Department of the Interior listing
- William Patrick Clark profile. American President. University of Virginia.

== Videos ==
- Remembering Judge William P. Clark, Jr. (3:09 mins). Youtube.com.
- Appearances on C-SPAN
- Four Biographies: Clark, Veliotes, Habib, Percy (1983). National Archives.

== See also ==
- List of justices of the Supreme Court of California

Legal offices
Preceded by Raymond E. Peters	Associate Justice of the California Supreme Court; 1973–1981	Succeeded by Allen Broussard
Political offices
Preceded by Warren Christopher	United States Deputy Secretary of State; 1981–1982	Succeeded by Walter Stoessel
Preceded by Richard Allen	National Security Advisor; 1982–1983	Succeeded by Robert McFarlane
Preceded by James Watt	United States Secretary of the Interior; 1983–1985	Succeeded by Donald Hodel
