= Lussier Hot Springs =

Thermal spring in British Columbia, Canada

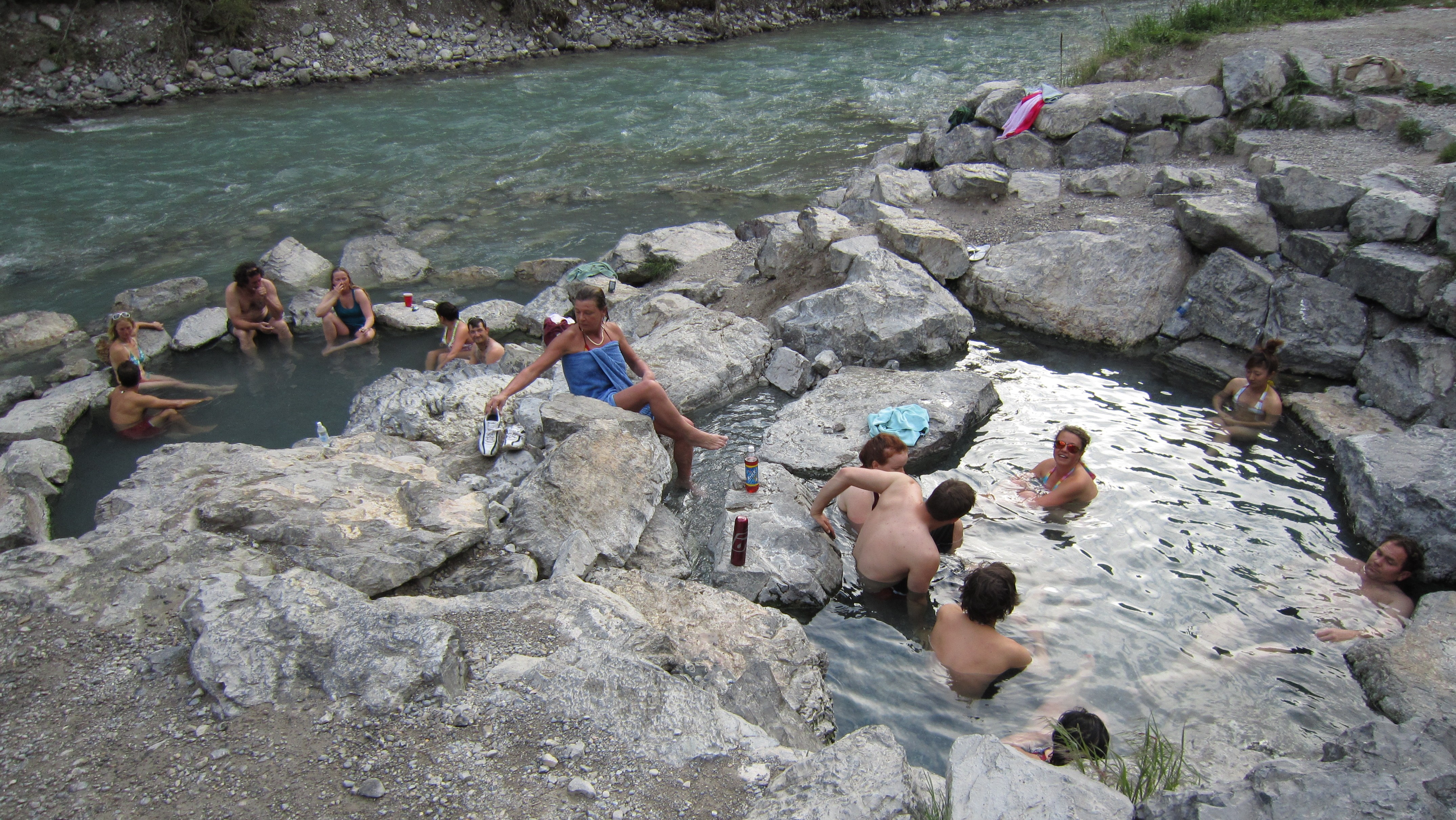
- A view of both pools looking towards the river

- Location within British Columbia
- Interactive map of Lussier Hot Springs
- Location: Whiteswan Lake Provincial Park, British Columbia
- Coordinates: 50°8′6.82″N 115°34′36.90″W
- Elevation: 1,099 metres (3,606 ft)
- Type: Natural Hot Spring
- Temperature: 43 °C (109 °F)

Lussier Hot Springs is an undeveloped hot spring just inside Whiteswan Lake Provincial Park in British Columbia, a province of Canada. Lussier Hot Springs, nestled along the Lussier River in British Columbia’s Whiteswan Lake Provincial Park, is a lightly developed natural hot spring with crystal-clear turquoise pools set into the hillside. Accessible via a 17 km gravel forestry road, the site feels remote and seldom crowded, particularly in the early morning or evening. Visitors descend a short but moderately steep 0.3-mile trail to reach three to four terraced rock pools, with temperatures ranging from approximately 47 °C in the uppermost pool to about 34 °C at the lower end. Open year-round, the springs offer a serene soak amid picturesque forest surroundings, with simple facilities like pit toilets at the trailhead and a strict no-alcohol, no-dogs, and clothing-required policy enforced by BC Parks. The combination of remote wilderness appeal and accessible infrastructure makes Lussier a cherished destination for those seeking a natural hot spring experience away from crowds.

== History ==
The hot springs are in traditional territory of the Ktunaxa people. In the early 20th century, the springs were used by prospectors, trappers and guides.

== Features ==
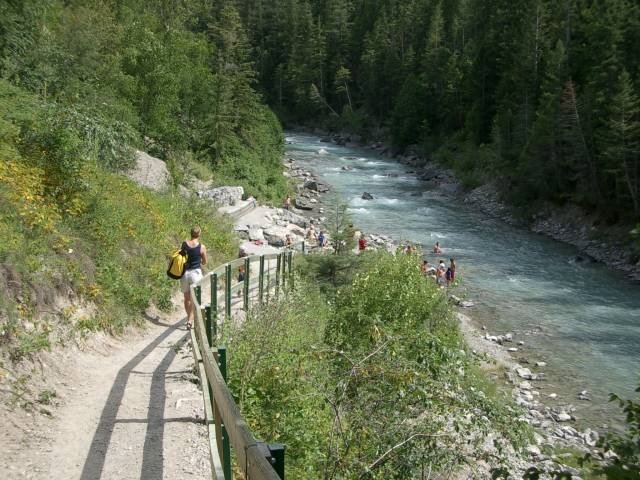
This is the view coming down the access path

The springs are made up of several rock pools with gravel bottoms. The hottest pool is up to 43 °C, and then the water cools to about 37 °C as it flows down through the rest towards the Lussier River.
