= Whiteswan Lake Provincial Park =

Provincial park in British Columbia, Canada

- IUCN category II (national park)
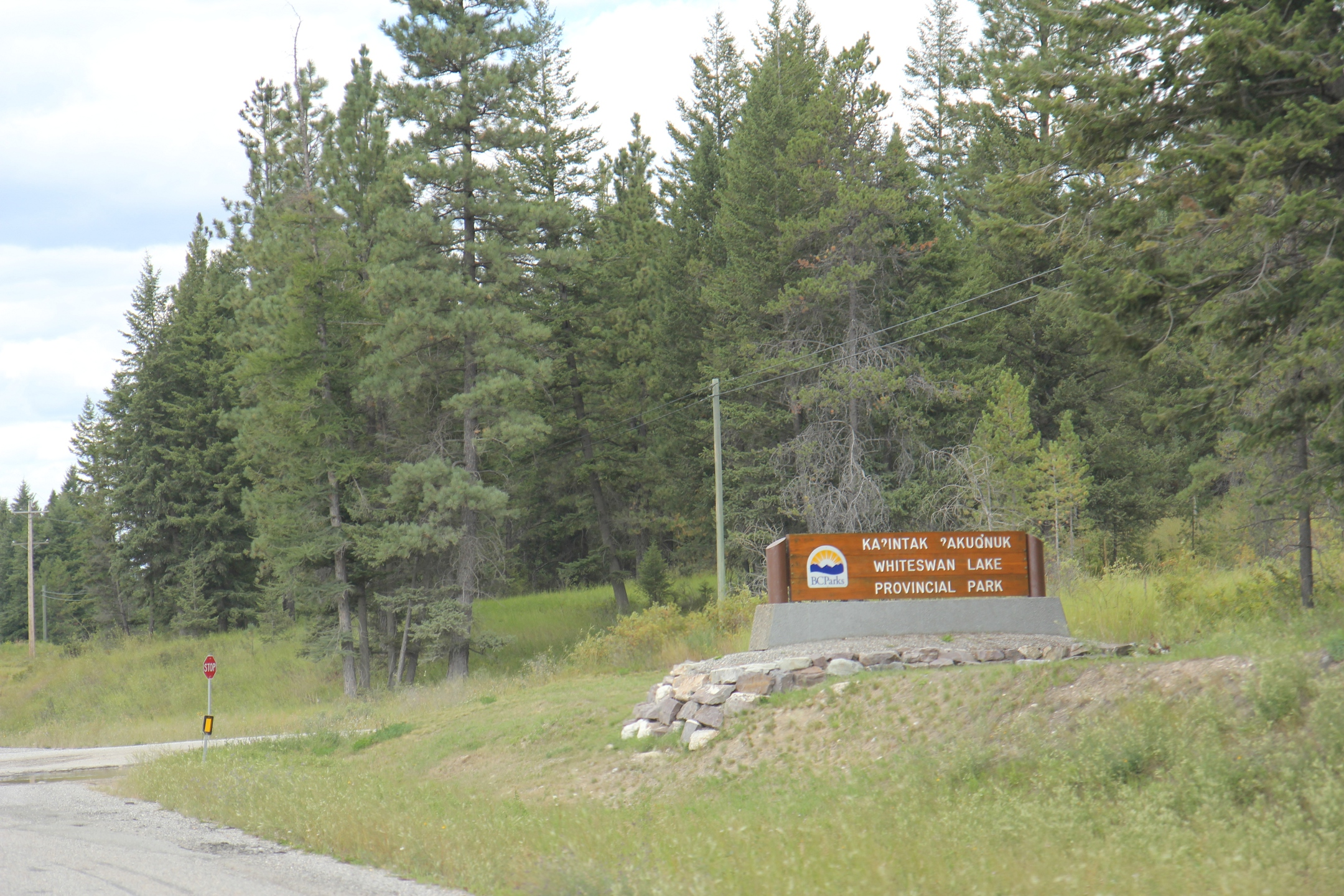
- Entrance to Whiteswan Lake Provincial Park along Highway 93/95

- Location within British Columbia
- Interactive map of Whiteswan Lake Provincial Park
- Location: British Columbia, Canada
- Nearest city: Canal Flats
- Coordinates: 50°7′9″N 115°32′43″W
- Area: 1,994 ha (7.70 sq mi)
- Governing body: BC Parks
- Website: bcparks.ca/whiteswan-lake-park/

Whiteswan Lake Provincial Park is a provincial park in British Columbia, Canada, located in the Kootenay Ranges of the Rocky Mountains, 22 km east of Canal Flats.

== Access ==
Access is East off Highway 93/95 at the Whiteswan Lake Provincial Park exit (which is located 22 km North of Skookumchuck or 8 km South of Canal Flats). Take the Whiteswan Forestry Road up to the park. It is a good condition gravel logging road that is accessible during the summer season with any vehicle. It is a 17 km drive up the road and be aware of the narrow winding section climbing up the Lussier gorge towards the end of the drive.

== Features ==
Two lakes, Whiteswan and Alces, and Lussier Hot Springs are the main attractions in the park. There are a total of five lake or river side campgrounds.
