= List of crossings of the Columbia River =

This is a list of bridges and other crossings of the Columbia River from the Pacific Ocean upstream to its source.

== Crossings ==
Photo	Crossing	River mile	Carries	Location	Coordinates
=== Oregon - Washington ===
Astoria-Megler Bridge	Astoria-Megler Bridge	13.5	US 101	Astoria, Oregon to Megler, Washington	46.217222°N 123.863056°W
Wahkiakum County Ferry	Wahkiakum County Ferry	43.2	SR 409	Westport, Oregon to Puget Island, Washington	46.13675°N 123.378028°W
Julia Butler Hansen Bridge	Julia Butler Hansen Bridge	n/a	SR 409	Puget Island, Washington to Cathlamet, Washington	46.19929°N 123.382323°W
Lewis & Clark Bridge	Lewis and Clark Bridge	66.0	SR 433	Longview, Washington to Rainier, Oregon	46.10472°N 122.961774°W
BNSF 9.6	Burlington Northern Railroad Bridge 9.6	105.6	BNSF Railway	Portland, Oregon to Vancouver, Washington	45.624722°N 122.690833°W
Interstate Bridge	Interstate Bridge	106.5	I-5	Portland, Oregon to Vancouver, Washington	45.618068°N 122.675138°W
Glenn L. Jackson Memorial Bridge	Glenn L. Jackson Memorial Bridge	112.7	I-205	Portland, Oregon to Vancouver, Washington	45.593056°N 122.548611°W
Bonneville Dam	Bonneville Dam	147.1		Lake Bonneville at Bonneville, Oregon and North Bonneville, Washington	45.642265°N 121.944792°W
Bridge of the Gods	Bridge of the Gods	148.3	Pacific Crest Trail	Cascade Locks, Oregon to near Stevenson, Washington	45.662424°N 121.901276°W
Hood River Bridge	Hood River Bridge	168.8		Hood River, Oregon to White Salmon, Washington	45.717976°N 121.495211°W
The Dalles Bridge	The Dalles Bridge	191.3	US 197	The Dalles, Oregon to Dallesport, Washington	45.610136°N 121.139099°W
The Dalles Dam	The Dalles Dam	191.5		Lake Celilo at The Dalles, Oregon	45.612868°N 121.132061°W
Oregon Trunk Rail Bridge	Oregon Trunk Rail Bridge	200.0	BNSF Railway		
Sam Hill Memorial Bridge	Sam Hill Memorial Bridge	208.2	US 97	Biggs Junction, Oregon to Maryhill, Washington	45.676143°N 120.836373°W
John Day Dam	John Day Dam	215.6		Lake Umatilla	45.714722°N 120.693611°W
Umatilla Bridge	Umatilla Bridge	290.3	I-82 / US 395	Umatilla, Oregon to Plymouth, Washington	
McNary Dam	McNary Dam	292.0		Lake Wallula	45.929722°N 119.296111°W
=== Washington ===
	Union Pacific Rail bridge	323.5	Union Pacific Railway		46.17871°N 119.01731°W
	BNSF Rail Bridge	328	BNSF Railway	Pasco, Washington to Kennewick, Washington	
Cable Bridge	Cable Bridge	328.5	SR 397	Pasco, Washington to Kennewick, Washington	46.218401°N 119.103813°W
Blue Bridge	Blue Bridge	330	US 395	Pasco, Washington to Kennewick, Washington	46.21955°N 119.10404°W
Interstate 182 Bridge	I-182 Bridge aka Lee-Volpentest Bridges	336	I-182 / US 12	Pasco, Washington to Richland, Washington	46.263917°N 119.245949°W
Vernita Bridge	Vernita Bridge	388	SR 24	West of Hanford Site	
Mattawa Ropeway Conveyor	Mattawa Ropeway Conveyor			Mattawa, Washington to West of Hanford Site	46.62684°N 119.864298°W
	Priest Rapids Dam	397.1		Priest Rapids Lake	
Beverly Railroad Bridge	Beverly Railroad Bridge aka Milwaukee Road Bridge		Former Chicago, Milwaukee, St. Paul and Pacific Railroad	Beverly, Washington	46.831111°N 119.948333°W
Wanapum Dam	Wanapum Dam	415.8		Lake Wanapum	46.875213°N 119.971004°W
Vantage Bridge	Vantage Bridge		I-90	Vantage, Washington	46.942293°N 119.973106°W
Rock Island Dam	Rock Island Dam	453.4		Rock Island Pool	47.342155°N 120.094773°W
Rock Island Railroad Bridge	Rock Island Railroad Bridge		BNSF Railway	Rock Island, Washington	47.366861°N 120.153722°W
Sellars Bridge	Senator George Sellar Bridge		SR 285	Wenatchee, Washington to East Wenatchee, Washington	
Old Wenatchee Bridge	Old Wenatchee Bridge		Pedestrian, water pipeline	Wenatchee, Washington to East Wenatchee, Washington	
Richard Odabashian Bridge, North Wenatchee Washington	Richard Odabashian Bridge		US 2 / US 97	Wenatchee, Washington to East Wenatchee, Washington	
Rocky Reach Dam	Rocky Reach Dam	473.7		Lake Entiat	47.533264°N 120.294424°W
Beebe Bridge	Beebe Bridge		US 97	Chelan, Washington	
Wells Dam	Wells Dam	515.1		Lake Pateros	47.9454°N 119.866°W
	Brewster Bridge		SR 173	Brewster, Washington	
Bridgeport Bridge	Bridgeport Bridge		SR 17	Bridgeport, Washington	
Chief Joseph Dam	Chief Joseph Dam	545.1		Rufus Woods Lake	47.995206°N 119.63321°W
Grand Coulee Bridge	Grand Coulee Bridge		SR 155	Coulee Dam, Washington	
Grand Coulee Dam	Grand Coulee Dam	596.6		Franklin D. Roosevelt Lake	47.956667°N 118.983333°W
Keller Ferry	Keller-Wilbur Ferry		SR 21	Keller, Washington to Wilbur, Washington	
Gifford–Inchelium Ferry	Gifford-Inchelium Ferry			Gifford, Washington to Inchelium, Washington	
Kettle Falls Bridges	Kettle Falls Bridges		US 395 / SR 20; BNSF Railway	Kettle Falls, Washington	
	Northport Bridge		SR 25	Northport, Washington	
=== British Columbia ===
Trail Bridge	Trail Bridge		Highway 3B / Highway 22A	Trail, British Columbia	
Kinnaird Bridge	Kinnaird Bridge		Highway 3 (Crowsnest Highway)	Castlegar, British Columbia	
	Rail bridge		Canadian Pacific Railway	Castlegar, British Columbia to Robson, British Columbia	
	Castlegar-Robson Bridge		Broadwater Road	Castlegar, British Columbia to Robson, British Columbia	
Keenleyside Dam	Keenleyside Dam	780.0		North of Castlegar, British Columbia	
Needles Cable Ferry	Needles Cable Ferry		Highway 6	Needles, British Columbia to Fauquier, British Columbia	
	Arrow Park Ferry			West Arrow Park to East Arrow Park	
	Upper Arrow Lake Ferry		Highway 23	Galena Bay, British Columbia to Shelter Bay, British Columbia	
Big Eddy Bridge	Big Eddy Bridge		Big Eddy Road	Revelstoke, British Columbia	
Rail bridge, Revelstoke, BC	Rail bridge		Canadian Pacific Railway	Revelstoke, British Columbia	
Revelstoke Bridge	Revelstoke Bridge		Highway 1 (Trans-Canada Highway) / Highway 23	Revelstoke, British Columbia	
Revelstoke Dam	Revelstoke Dam	934.0		Revelstoke Lake	
Mica Dam	Mica Dam	1018.0		Mica Creek, British Columbia	52.076117°N 118.566404°W
	Boat Encampment ferry			Boat Encampment	
	Boat Encampment bridge		Big Bend Highway	Boat Encampment	
	Rail bridge		Canadian Pacific Railway	Donald, British Columbia	
	Donald ferry			Donald, British Columbia	
	Donald highway bridge		Highway 1 (Trans-Canada Highway)	Donald, British Columbia	
	Kicking Horse Drive Bridge		Kicking Horse Drive	Golden, British Columbia	
	Canyon Creek Bridge			Nicholson, British Columbia	
	Parson bridge		Parson River Crossing Road	Parson, British Columbia	
	Parson ferry			Parson, British Columbia	
	Spillimacheen bridge		Westside Road	Spillimacheen, British Columbia	
	Spillimacheen ferry			Spillimacheen, British Columbia	
	Botts Channel Bridge		Brisco Road	Brisco, British Columbia	
	Brisco Road bridge		Brisco Road	Brisco, British Columbia	
	Brisco ferry			Brisco, British Columbia	
	Forsters Landing Bridge		Forsters Landing Road	Radium Hot Springs, British Columbia	50.62376624°N 116.10639095°W
	Athalmer bridge		Athalmer Road	Athalmer, British Columbia	50.515608°N 116.019303°W
	Athalmer ferry			Athalmer, British Columbia	
	Fairmont Bridge		Highway 93 / Highway 95	Fairmont Hot Springs, British Columbia	50.323552°N 115.8662818°W

== See also ==
- List of crossings of the Willamette River
- Lists of Oregon-related topics
- Outline of Washington (state)
- List of British Columbia-related topics
