= Kettle Falls Bridges =

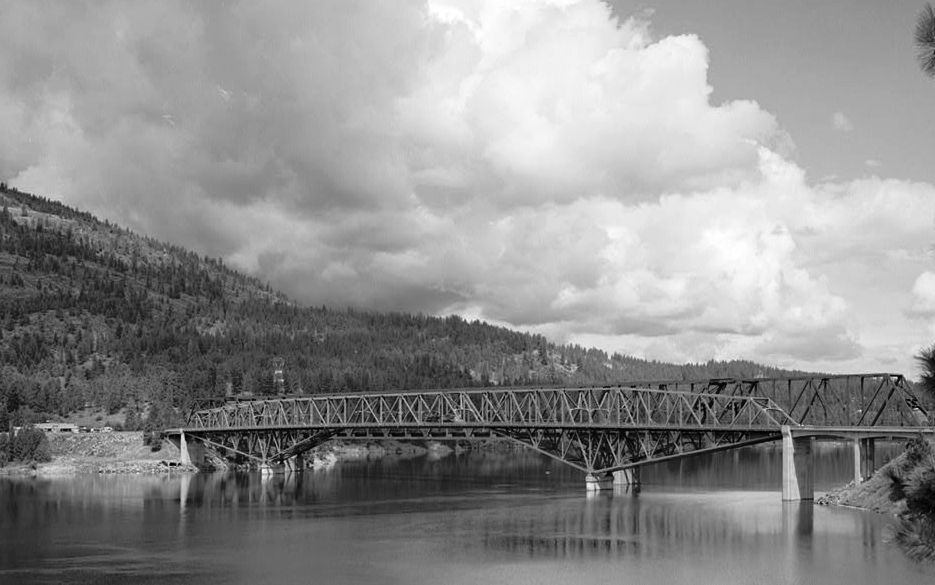
- Coordinates: 48°37′33″N 118°07′03″W
- Carries: Kettle Falls International Railway (north bridge); US 395 / SR 20 (south bridge)
- Crosses: Columbia River
- Locale: Kettle Falls, Washington

Characteristics
- Design: Steel cantilever

History
- Opened: May 3, 1941
- Columbia River Bridge at Kettle Falls
- U.S. National Register of Historic Places
- Area: Less than one acre
- Architectural style: Steel through truss
- MPS: Bridges of Washington State MPS
- NRHP reference No.: 95000260
- Added to NRHP: March 28, 1995

Location
- Interactive map of Kettle Falls Bridges

The Kettle Falls Bridges is the collective name for a pair of steel cantilever bridges carrying State Route 20/U.S. Route 395 and the Kettle Falls International Railway across the Columbia River at Kettle Falls, Washington. The south bridge carries motor vehicle traffic while the similar northern span is used for rail.

== History ==
On May 3, 1941, the Columbia River road bridge at Kettle Falls opened to traffic. Both bridges were constructed to replace bridges flooded by waters rising behind the Grand Coulee Dam to form Franklin D. Roosevelt Lake. The bridges are historically significant because they feature the longest central spans of any highway bridge built in Washington state during the 1940s. In 1995 the steel truss road bridge was added to the National Register of Historic Places.

== Road bridge ==
The road bridge, with a total length of 1,266 feet (386 m), was completed in 1941, replacing a 1929 steel deck truss bridge whose location was to be partly submerged by Lake Roosevelt as it backed up behind the new Grand Coulee Dam. The bridge initially carried Primary State Highway 3, later designated U.S. Route 395. The bridge is primarily a steel cantilever structure with an almost horizontal top chord and sloping bottom chords, designed to reduce the height of the concrete piers. Concrete T-beam approach spans are used, with unusual sloping concrete bets that serve to laterally brace the first piers supporting the steel structure against pressure of embankment fill.

The central span is 300 feet (91 m) long, with 150-foot (46 m) cantilevered spans for a total span between piers of 600 feet (180 m). Anchor spans are 225 feet (69 m), with a 143-foot (44 m) east approach span and a 73-foot (22 m) west approach span. The two-lane bridge was the longest span to be built in Washington between 1941 and 1950. The bridge was designed by the Washington Department of Highways, R. W. Finke, designer, and was fabricated by the L. Romano Engineering Company of Seattle. The project was financed by the U.S. Bureau of Reclamation as part of the Grand Coulee project. The crossing was originally intended to be a single dual-use bridge, carrying the highway and the Great Northern Railroad, which also had to be relocated, but a joint contract could not be negotiated with the railroad, and a parallel rail crossing was built with similar construction.

The Kettle Falls bridge is similar to the Grand Coulee Bridge, built in 1935, but with refinements to aesthetics by replacing the Coulee Bridge's laced channels with built-up punched channel bracing. The design was repeated on a larger scale at the Northport Bridge in 1948. The bridge opened on May 3, 1941. The old bridge was disassembled, except for its piers, that summer.

The Kettle Falls road bridge was listed on the National Register of Historic Places on March 28, 1995.

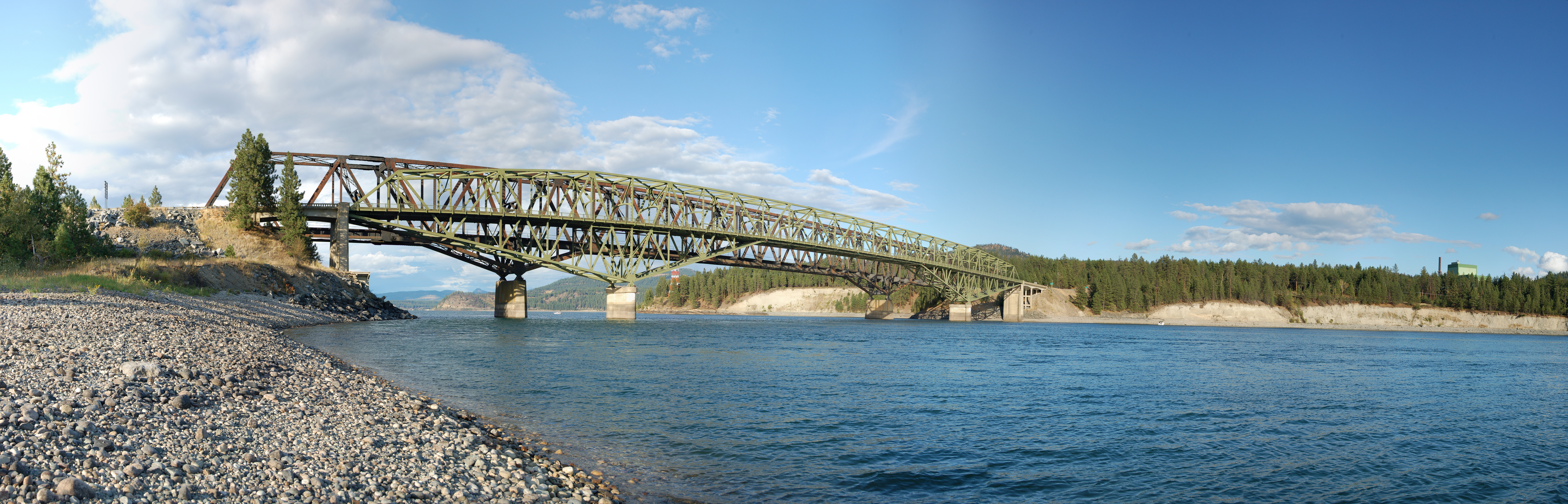
120° panorama of the twin bridges spanning the Columbia River at Kettle Falls, Washington.

== See also ==
- List of bridges documented by the Historic American Engineering Record in Washington (state)
- List of crossings of the Columbia River
