= Washington State Route 251 =

Former state highway in Stevens County, Washington, US

State Route 251
- Northport–Boundary Road
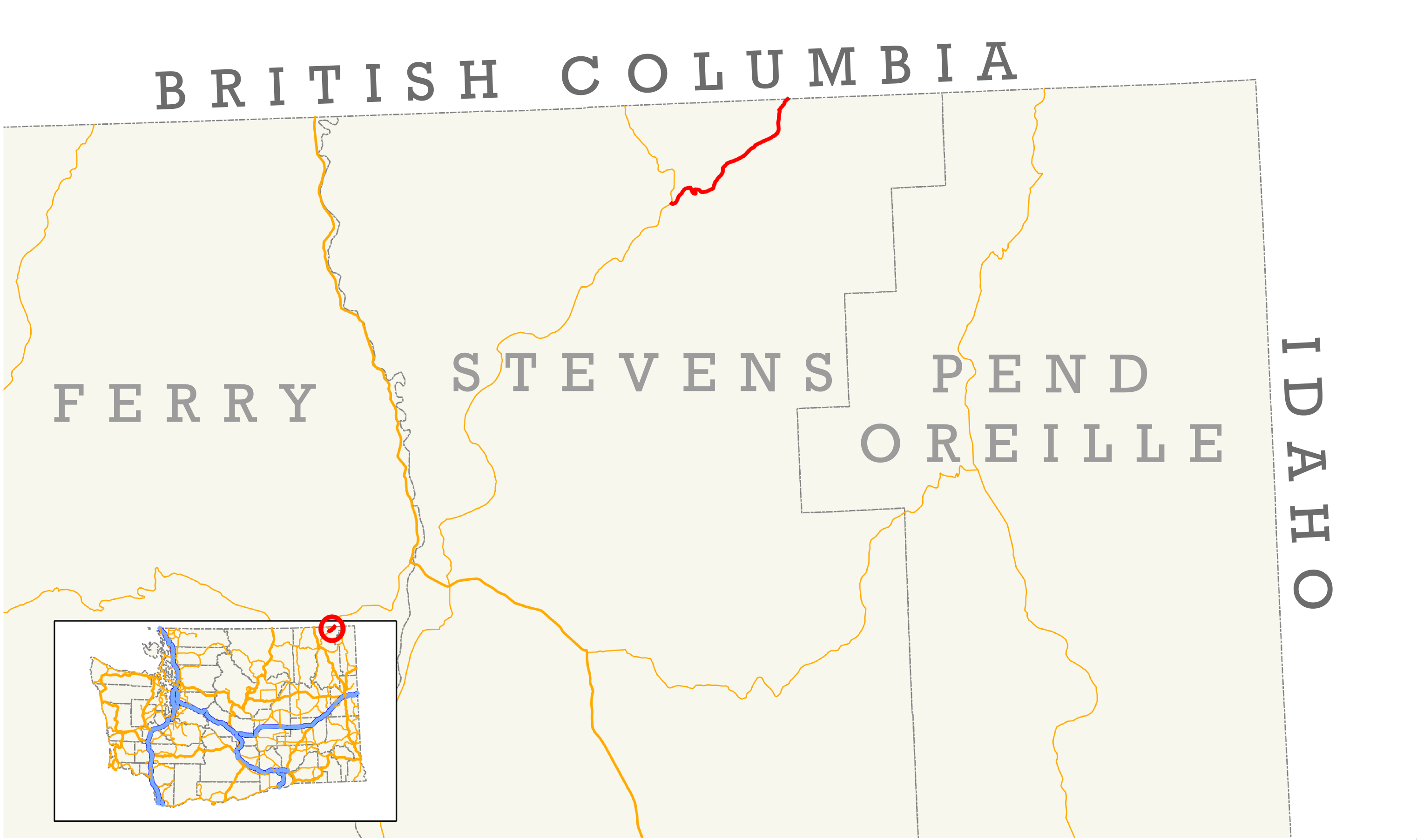
- A map highlighting the route of SR 251 prior to 1983.

Route information
- Auxiliary route of SR 25
- Length: 10.86 mi (17.48 km)
- Existed: 1964–1983

Major junctions
- South end: SR 25 in Northport
- North end: Highway 22A at the Canada–United States border

Location
- Country: United States
- State: Washington
- Counties: Stevens

Highway system
- State highways in Washington; Interstate; US; State; Scenic; Pre-1964; 1964 renumbering; Former
← SR 243	→ SR 260

State Route 251 (SR 251, now Northport–Boundary Road) is a former 10.86-mile (17.48 km) long state highway in Stevens County, Washington. The highway began at SR 25 in Northport and continued northeast parallel to the Columbia River to Boundary, an unincorporated community, where it crossed the Canada–United States border into British Columbia as British Columbia Highway 22A. SR 251 was originally a county road until 1913, when it was added to the state highway system, but was later removed. The roadway was re-added as an extension to an already existing state highway. In 1937, it was reclassified as a secondary highway named Secondary State Highway 22A (SSH 22A) until 1964, when it became SR 251. In 1984, control of the road was relinquished by the state to Stevens County and it was renamed Northport–Boundary Road.

== Route description ==
State Route 251 (SR 251), now known as the Northport–Boundary Road or Boundary Highway, began in Northport at an at-grade intersection at Center Street, known as SR 25. The highway turned north from SR 25 and followed the Columbia River upstream as well a railroad owned by the Kettle Falls International Railway. The highway traveled northeast, then east through a series of hairpin turns before turning north to Boundary, an unincorporated community in Stevens County, where SR 251 entered Canadian customs and continued into British Columbia as British Columbia Highway 22A (BC 22A).

== History ==
SR 251 was once a county road connecting Northport with British Columbia that has existed since at least 1912. In 1913, it became part of the Inland Empire Highway, but was removed in 1915. The road was transferred to county maintenance after removal from the state highway system. In 1931, it was officially added to the state highway system as part of an extension of State Road 22 from Kettle Falls to British Columbia. In 1937, it became Secondary State Highway 22A (SSH 22A), a branch of Primary State Highway 22 (PSH 22). When Washington renumbered its highways in 1964 and switched to a new system, SSH 22A became SR 251 and PSH 22 became SR 25. SR 251 remained one of only four state highways in Washington that remained gravel roads. In 1983, SR 251 was removed from the state highway system and control was relinquished to Stevens County. After it was turned over, Stevens County continues to maintain the roadway and no realignments or significant events have occurred.

== Major intersections ==
The entire highway was in Stevens County.

Location	mi	km	Destinations	Notes
Northport	0.00	0.00	SR 25 (Center Street) – Kettle Falls, Border Crossing	
	10.86	17.48	Highway 22A	Continuation beyond Boundary-Waneta Border Crossing into British Columbia
1.000 mi = 1.609 km; 1.000 km = 0.621 mi
