= Hunters, Washington =

Unincorporated community in Washington, United States

- Unincorporated community
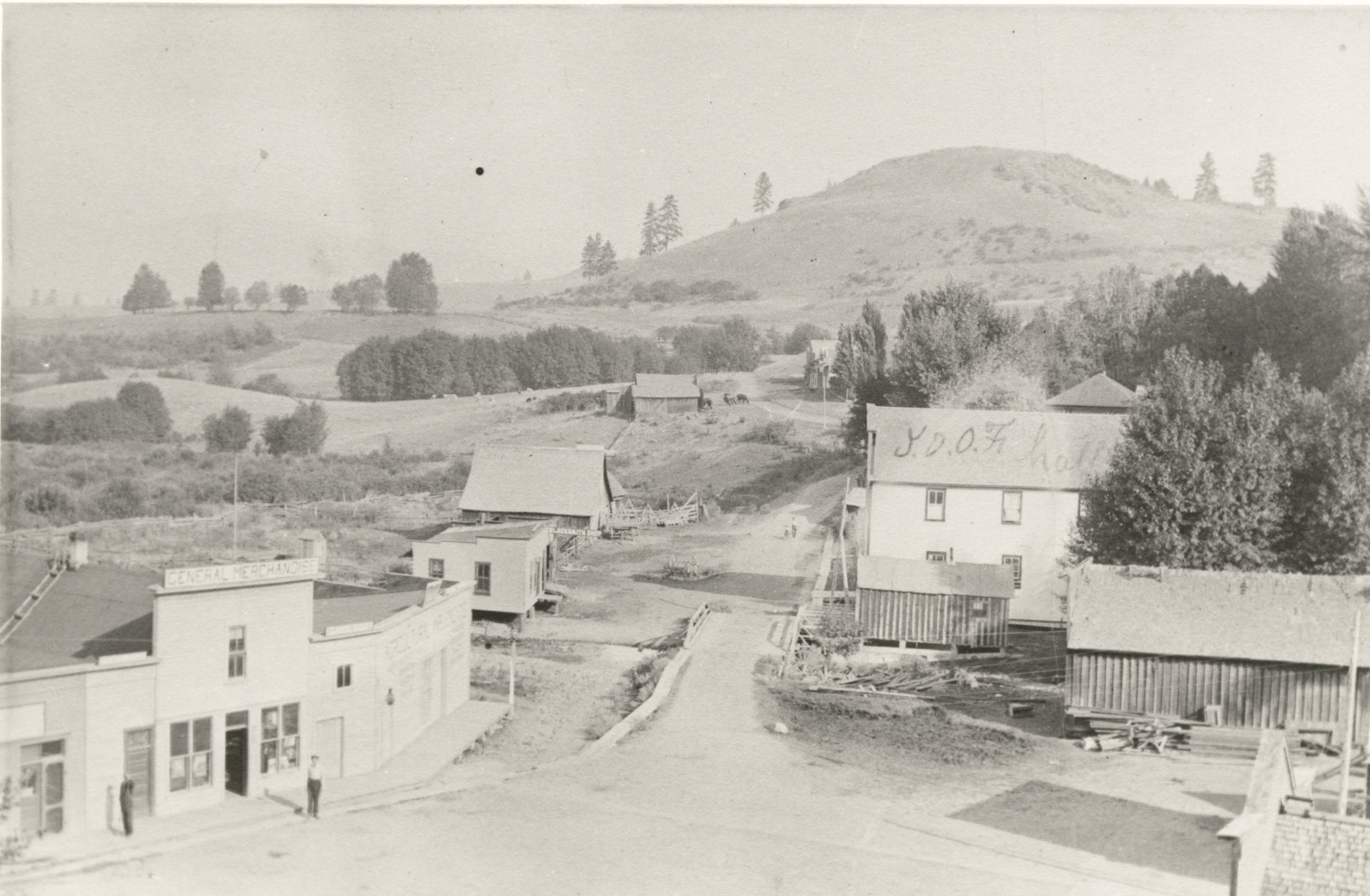
- Hunters in the 19th century

- Location within Washington (state)
- Coordinates: 48°07′01″N 118°12′07″W
- Country: United States
- State: Washington
- County: Stevens
- Elevation: 1,588 ft (484 m)
- Time zone: UTC-8 (Pacific (PST))
  - Summer (DST): UTC-7 (PDT)
- ZIP code: 99137
- Area code: 509
- GNIS feature ID: 1512314

Hunters is an unincorporated community in Stevens County, Washington, United States. The population for its zip code (99137) was 306 at the 2000 census.

A post office called Hunters has been in operation since 1884. The community has the name of James Hunter, a pioneer settler.

== Demographics ==
As of the census of 2000, there were 306 people, and 135 households residing in the zip code. The racial makeup of the community was 87.6% White, 0.3% African American, 4.6% Native American, 0.3% Asian, 2.0% from other races, and 4.9% from two or more races. Hispanic or Latino of any race were 12.5% of the population.

In the community, the population was spread out, with 71.9% over the age of 18, 15.4% over the age of 65. The median age was 41.5 years.

The median income for a household in the community was $22,143, and the median income for a family was $21,000.

For population 25 years and older, 80.9% have a high school diploma or higher, and 12.3% have a bachelor's degree or higher.

== Surrounding communities ==
Even though the community is not incorporated as a town, it serves as a focal point of the surrounding smaller communities. These communities include Cedonia, Bissel, Gifford and Daisy to the north and Fruitland and Enterprise to the south. Hunters provides schooling at Columbia High School.
