= Northport Bridge =

- Columbia River Bridge at Northport
- U.S. National Register of Historic Places
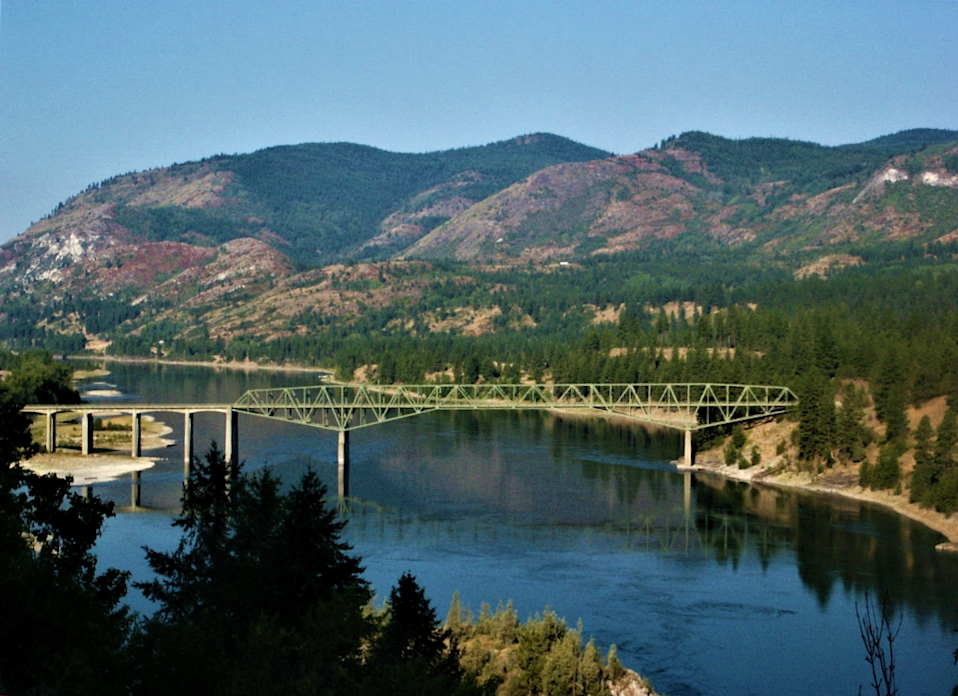

- Location within Washington (state) Location within the United States
- Nearest city: Northport, Washington
- Coordinates: 48°55′21″N 117°46′32″W
- Area: less than one acre
- Built: 1946–1949
- Built by: State Dept. of Hwys
- Architectural style: Steel Through truss
- MPS: Bridges of Washington State MPS
- NRHP reference No.: 95000624
- Added to NRHP: May 24, 1995

The Northport Bridge spans the Columbia River near Northport, Washington, close to the border with Canada. The steel cantilever through-truss bridge replaced an 1897 timber bridge, and was opened in 1951. It carries Washington State Route 25. It is one of a series of similar bridges built at about the same time, including the Grand Coulee Bridge and the Kettle Falls Bridges.

The Northport Bridge's total length is 1,542 feet (470 m). The main span consists of a central span of 224 feet (68 m) between 140-foot (43 m) cantilever spans, for a total span of 504 feet (154 m). The steel anchor spans are 168 feet (51 m) long, with additional concrete approach spans. The bridge opened to traffic on June 13, 1951, at a cost of $1,751,587.

The bridge was designed by George Stevens of the Washington State Highways, and the main span was built by the Midland Structural Steel Company. Work began in August 1946. Floods in 1948 undermined the south main pier of the steel structure, causing the design to be changed from a section of earth fill to five additional T-beam concrete approach spans. Underwater blasting was required to remove the south pier for the altered work, resulting in a 673-foot (205 m) series of concrete approach spans on the south.

The Northport Bridge was placed on the National Register of Historic Places on May 24, 1995.
