= Washington State Route 25 =

North-south state highway in Washington, US

State Route 25
- Coulee Reservoir Highway
- SR 25 highlighted in red

Route information
- Maintained by WSDOT
- Length: 121.17 mi (195.00 km)
- Existed: 1964–present

Major junctions
- South end: US 2 in Davenport
- US 395 / SR 20 in Kettle Falls
- North end: Highway 22 at the Canadian border near Northport

Location
- Country: United States
- State: Washington
- Counties: Lincoln, Stevens

Highway system
- State highways in Washington; Interstate; US; State; Scenic; Pre-1964; 1964 renumbering; Former
← SR 24	→ SR 26

State Route 25 (SR 25), named the Coulee Reservoir Highway, is a 121.17-mile-long (195.00 km) state highway serving communities in Lincoln and Stevens counties in the U.S. state of Washington. The highway begins at an intersection with U.S. Route 2 (US 2) east of Davenport and continues northwest to cross the Spokane River. From there, SR 25 parallels the Columbia River and Franklin D. Roosevelt Lake upstream through several small communities, passing the Gifford–Inchelium Ferry, to Kettle Falls. In Kettle Falls, the roadway intersects US 395, co-signed with SR 20 and continues north to Northport, where former SR 251 is intersected and SR 25 crosses the Columbia River on the Northport Bridge. The highway travels northwest to the Canadian border, where it becomes British Columbia Highway 22 (BC 22).

SR 25 was originally a series of county roads built before 1912, but became part of the Inland Empire Highway in 1913 between Meyers Falls, now known as Kettle Falls, and Northport. In 1915, the highway was realigned west and roads from Davenport to Meyers Falls became State Road 22 (SR 22), which was extended north to Canada in 1931. In 1937, SR 22 became Primary State Highway 22 (PSH 22) and the border crossing was moved west of the Columbia River. PSH 22 was decommissioned in favor of SR 25 in a state highway renumbering in 1964. SR 25 also had an auxiliary route, SR 251, that existed from 1964 until 1983 and ran north from Northport to the Canadian border at Boundary.

SR 25 crosses the Spokane and Columbia rivers on the Spokane River Bridge and Columbia River Bridge, respectively. The Spokane River Bridge was built in 1941 to replace an earlier span, known as the Detillion Bridge, that was flooded by Franklin D. Roosevelt Lake. The Columbia River Bridge was completed in 1951 to serve the town of Northport. Both bridges are steel cantilever spans that were inducted onto the National Register of Historic Places in 1995. The Gifford–Inchelium Ferry that connects the highway to Inchelium began operating in 1898, but was closed from 1974 until 1981, when the Colville Confederated Tribes began operating the MV Columbian Princess with a free fare.

== Route description ==
SR 25, named the Coulee Reservoir Highway, begins at an intersection with U.S. Route 2 (US 2) east of Davenport and the eastern terminus of SR 28. The highway travels northwest through farmland and grasslands in rural Lincoln County. Near Fort Spokane, part of Lake Roosevelt National Recreation Area, From Fort Spokane, the roadway travels over the Spokane River on the Spokane River Bridge, a steel cantilever span built in 1941 to replace an older bridge that was flooded by Franklin D. Roosevelt Lake, into Stevens County. From the bridge, SR 25 turns northeast, paralleling the Columbia River upstream through Hunters and Cedonia to Gifford. At Gifford, the highway serves as eastern terminus of the Gifford–Inchelium Ferry that travels across the Columbia River to the community of Inchelium in Ferry County and is owned by the Colville Confederated Tribes. There isn't a fare for the ferry, named the MV Columbia Princess, and it runs daily every 15 minutes from 6:30 am to 10:45 pm. From the ferry, the road continues north through forests and the community of Rice to Kettle Falls. West of Kettle Falls, SR 25 passes under an overpass used by the Kettle Falls–Grand Forks, BC route operated by the Kettle Falls International Railway.

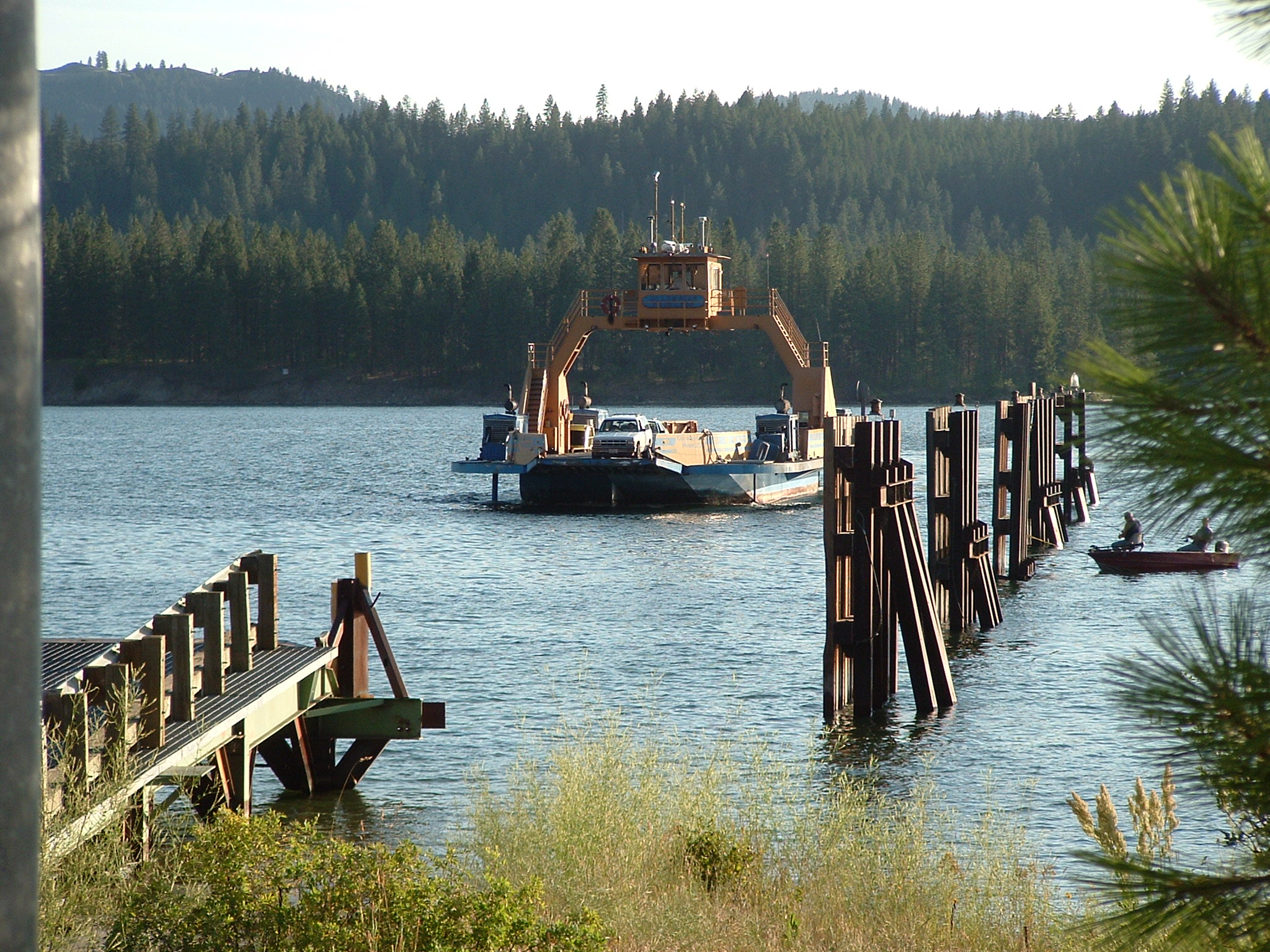
The Gifford–Inchelium Ferry operates across the Columbia River from Inchelium to SR 25 in Gifford.

Immediately north of the overpass, the highway intersects U.S. Route 395 (US 395), co-signed with SR 20. From the intersection, the roadway continues northeast paralleling the Columbia River and the Kettle Falls–Columbia Gardens, BC route of the Kettle Falls International Railway through Marcus and Ryan to Northport. In Northport, the highway becomes Center Street and travels through the city center before intersecting the Northport–Boundary Road, which was formerly SR 251 until 1983. Center Street ends and SR 25 turns northwest to cross the Columbia River on the Northport Bridge, a steel cantilever span built in 1951. From the bridge, the highway travels north and rapidly turns west and reverts to north towards the Canadian border. The road is named Little Sheep Creek Road and crosses into Canada as British Columbia Highway 22 (BC 22) to a customs checkpoint.

== History ==
SR 25 was PSH 22 until 1964.

SR 25 began as a series of county roads connecting small communities on the Columbia River that were constructed between 1909 and 1912. In 1913, the Inland Empire Highway was established and included a segment from Meyers Falls, currently known as Kettle Falls, to the Canadian border at Boundary was included. The Inland Empire Highway was shifted west in 1915 and several roads from Meyers Falls to Davenport became State Road 22 (SR 22) and crossed the Spokane River with the Detillion Bridge. SR 22 remained unchanged through a 1923 restructuring of the state road system, but was extended north to the Canadian border at Boundary in 1931. In 1937, SR 22 became Primary State Highway 22 (PSH 22) and the northern terminus was realigned to end northwest of Northport, while the old route became Secondary State Highway 22A (SSH 22A). Washington renumbered its highways in 1964 to correspond to a new sign route, later state route, system. PSH 22 became SR 25 and SSH 22A became SR 251, an auxiliary route of SR 25. SR 251 was later removed from the state highway system in 1983.

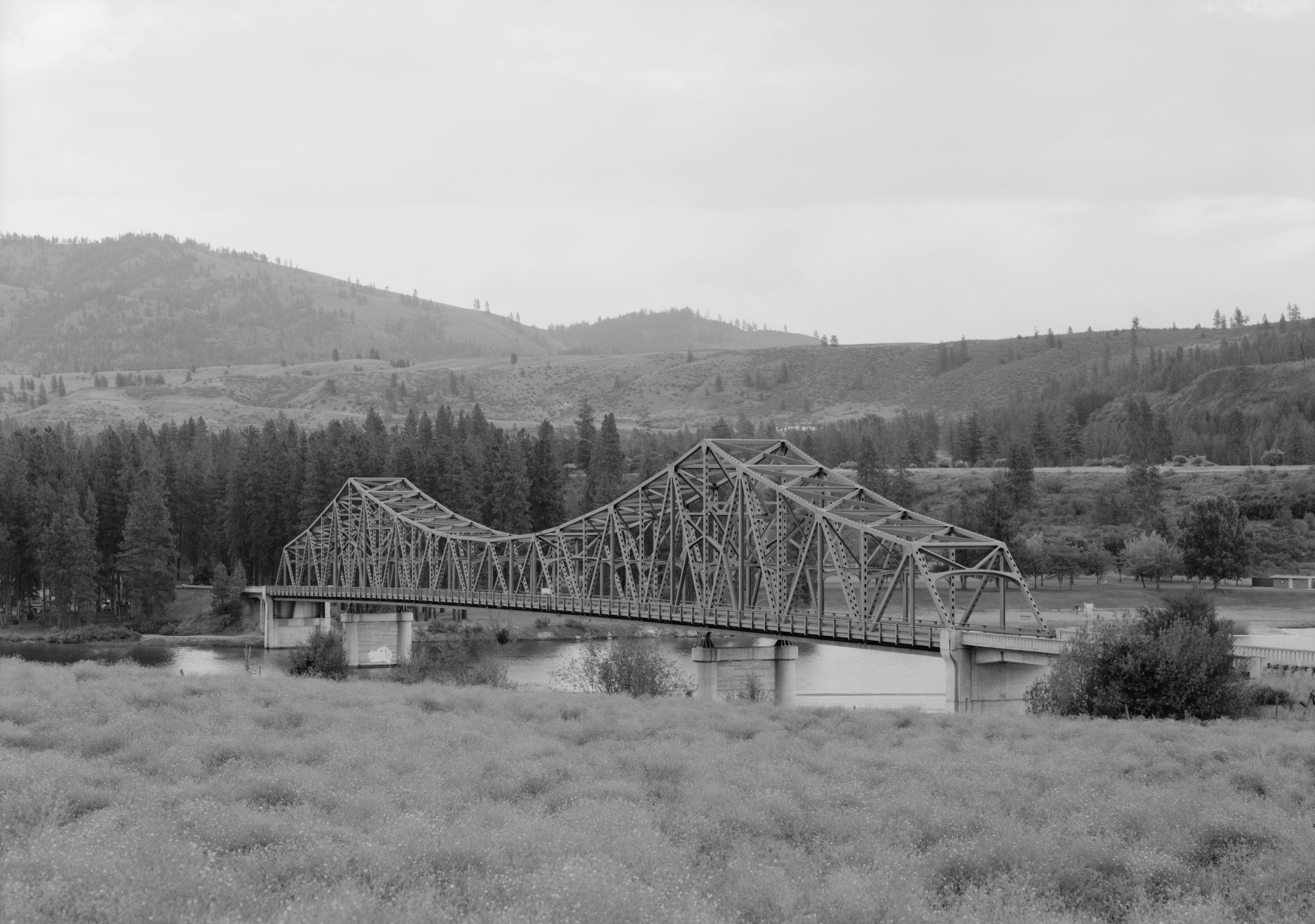
SR 25 crosses the Spokane River using the Spokane River Bridge, which opened in 1941.

The Spokane River Bridge, successor of the Detillion Bridge, was opened in 1941 to replace the span, which was flooded by Franklin D. Roosevelt Lake. A bridge across the Columbia River at Northport began construction in 1949 and was completed as the Columbia River Bridge on June 13, 1951. On March 28, 1995, the Spokane River Bridge at Fort Spokane was listed on the National Register of Historic Places and was joined by the Columbia River Bridge at Northport on May 24, 1995.

A ferry between Inchelium and SR 25 at Gifford on the Columbia River has operated since 1898 under various owners and with various vessels. In 1898, the ferry was first opened to public traffic, a result of a Congressional decision to open up the Colville Indian Reservation to mineral mining. When Franklin D. Roosevelt Lake was created after the Grand Coulee Dam was built in 1941, the ferry was moved to higher ground. Ferry service remained privately owned until 1974, when it was closed due to low traffic. In 1981, the Colville Confederated Tribes and United States Bureau of Indian Affairs began a new ferry service with the MV Columbian Princess and continues to the present.

== Major intersections ==
County	Location	mi	km	Destinations	Notes
Lincoln	Davenport	0.000	0.000	US 2 – Spokane, Wenatchee	
Spokane River		23.35– 23.53	37.58– 37.87		
Stevens	Kettle Falls	81.07	130.47	US 395 / SR 20 – Colville, Grand Forks, BC	
Stevens	Northport	113.67	182.93	Northport-Boundary Road	Former SR 251
Stevens		121.17	195.00	Highway 22 – Rossland, Trail	Continuation into British Columbia, Canada
1.000 mi = 1.609 km; 1.000 km = 0.621 mi

== Related routes ==
State Route 251
- Location: Northport – Canadian border
- Length: 10.86 mi (17.48 km)
- Existed: 1964–1983

Three digit state highway numbers are considered auxiliary routes of their one or two digit parent route, thus SR 25 has one decommissioned auxiliary route, SR 251.

SR 251 was a 10.86-mile-long (17.48 km) highway that ran from Northport, paralleling the Columbia River and a rail line operated by Kettle Falls International Railway, to the Canadian border at Boundary. Originally county roads until 1912, the general route became part of the Inland Empire Highway from 1913 until removal from state maintenance in 1915. The roadway became state-maintained again when State Road 22 was extended north to Canada in 1931. In 1937, the extension became SSH 22A, which later was designated as SR 251 from 1964 until 1983. The roadway is now known as the Northport–Boundary Highway and continues to be maintained by Stevens County.
