= Parson, British Columbia =

Parson
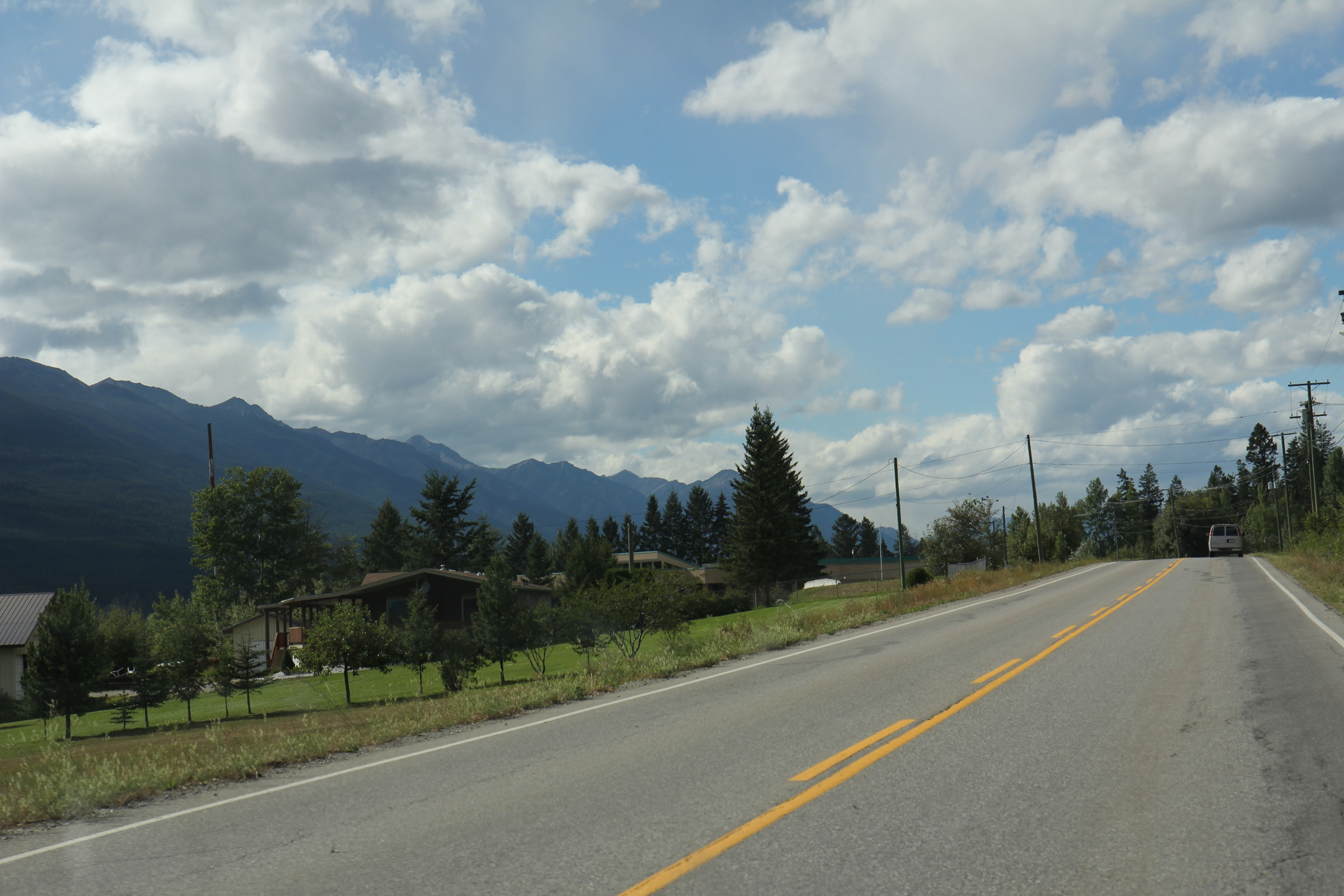
- Northward view of residences, Parson

- Location of Parson in British Columbia Parson (Canada)
- Coordinates: 51°03′59″N 116°38′04″W
- Country: Canada
- Province: British Columbia
- Region: Columbia Valley
- Regional District: Columbia-Shuswap
- Time zone: UTC−07:00 (MST)
  - Summer (DST): UTC−06:00 (MDT)
- Postal code: V0A 1L0
- Area codes: 250, 778, 236, & 672
- Highways: Highway 95

Parson is an unincorporated community on the east shore of the Columbia River, in the Columbia Valley region of southeastern British Columbia. The locality, on BC Highway 95, is by road about 212 kilometres (132 mi) north of Cranbrook and 35 kilometres (22 mi) southeast of Golden.

== Name origin ==
E. Thomas Johnson (Johnston alternate spelling) operated a hotel in a tent 1884–1886, before returning to farming and prospecting. During the westward advance of the Canadian Pacific Railway transcontinental line at this time, alcohol was considered a disruptive influence in the construction camps. Consequently, a 32-kilometre (20 mi) alcohol-free zone was instituted on both sides of the right-of-way. At Johnson's Ranch, about 40 kilometres (25 mi) by river southeast of Golden, liquor was freely available. Men sleeping off the effects of intoxication at the horse ranch were characterized as pigs (hogs). Consequently, the former name of Johnson's Landing changed to Johnson's Hog Ranch and then to Hog Ranch. The prohibition lifted when the CP line opened to traffic in 1886.

The ranch had also been a rendezvous point for liquor smugglers. In 1884, about 5 kilometres (3 mi) south, an outlaw robbed and murdered a salesman for an American liquor company, who was carrying around $5,000. Attempts to extradite the murderer who had fled to the US were unsuccessful, but the perpetrator died in a train accident in 1890.

In 1897, Henry George Parson purchased the ranch.

The selection of the train station name in 1912, and the post office in 1916, established the locality as Parson, but as late as 1921, the census still defined the place as Hog Ranch.

== Waterway and roads ==
Early and later transportation was similar to Spillimacheen. In 1884, the government called tenders for a ferry across the Columbia at Johnston's Landing, which commenced operations at that time. North–south riverboats and pack trains stopped at the place. By late fall, ice shut down river traffic until early spring. During 1890, wagon road construction reached Hog Ranch from the south. However, from the north, the wagon road southward was 6 kilometres (4 mi) short of Carbonate, which itself was 11 kilometres (7 mi) from Hog Ranch. During the following spring, work began on closing the 18-kilometre (11 mi) gap. In 1893, the wagon road between the two locations was completed, and a deficient section south to Spillimacheen upgraded. Both Carbonate and Hog Ranch were regular riverboat stops.

In 1897, the Skullys managed the hotel at the stopping place for H.G. Parson. In 1899, the respective mileposts from Golden were Carbonate (16), Hog Ranch (23), and Spillimachene (41).

The Parson ferry was subsidized 1920–1929, when a bridge replaced it.

== Early community ==
In 1897, Thomas Alton built a sawmill at the locality, which he sold to Cranbrook Sawmills in 1943.

In 1916, Miss E.R. Sparling was the inaugural teacher at the school.

Elizabeth Hawkins was the inaugural postmaster 1916–1916, followed by James Hawkins 1917–1921. By 1918, dairy farmer R.H. Soles ran a general store, but by 1919, the Hawkins ran the Parson Trading Co general store. In 1921, Andrew Allan Gilmour took over the store/post office, followed by Leslie G. Alton in 1924, who remained until 1950.

Complementing his Brisco operation, Ralph A. Thrall, quarried baryte about 10 kilometres (6 mi) west during the 1940s, 1950s, and 1960s. Sawmills operating in 1959 were Cranbrook Sawmills, A.D. Hough, O'Bray Bros, and John L. Soles.

== Railway ==
The Kootenay Central Railway (KCR) was a Canadian Pacific Railway (CP) subsidiary. Advancing southeastward, the rail head was about 5 kilometres (3 mi) northwest of Parson in November 1912. Subsequent railway development mirrored Spillimacheen.

Train Timetables (Regular stop or Flag stop)
	Mile	1913	1916	1919	1929	1932	1935	1939	1943	1948	1953	1955	1960	1963
Ref.														
Nicholson	162.1	Regular	Flag	Flag	Regular	Regular	Regular	Regular	Regular	Regular	Regular	Regular	Mixed	Nil
Mallett	151.6	Regular												
Mons	151.6		Flag	Flag										
McMurdo	151.5				Regular	Regular	Regular	Regular	Regular	Regular	Regular	Regular	Mixed	Nil
Parson	143.7	Regular	Flag	Flag	Regular	Regular	Regular	Regular	Regular	Regular	Regular	Regular	Mixed	Nil
Harrogate	132.6	Regular	Flag	Flag	Regular	Regular	Regular	Regular	Regular	Regular	Regular	Regular	Mixed	Nil
Spillimacheen	125.6	Regular	Regular	Regular	Regular	Regular	Regular	Regular	Regular	Regular	Regular	Regular	Mixed	Nil

When forestry was dominant, a loading yard was established at Parson, where logs for the Canal Flats sawmill were loaded onto a fleet of Crestbrook Forest Industry flat cars for delivery to the Canal Flats mill. In the 1990s, highway trucking led to the closure of this loading facility.

== Later community ==
The Columbia Valley Elementary School permanently closed in 2002.

The community hall (1939), which had fallen into disrepair and disuse, was rehabilitated in the late 2010s for community events.

The Parson Community Recreation Park facilitates tennis, baseball, beach volleyball, and basketball in summer and skating and sledding in winter.

Twig and Berry Trading Co operates the general store/post office/liquor outlet/gas bar.

In 2022, Rogers sought public feedback on erecting a 63.2-metre (207 ft) self-support tower approximately 3 kilometres (2 mi) south of Parson, which would provide new 5G wireless coverage, from Golden to Spillimacheen.

== Gallery ==
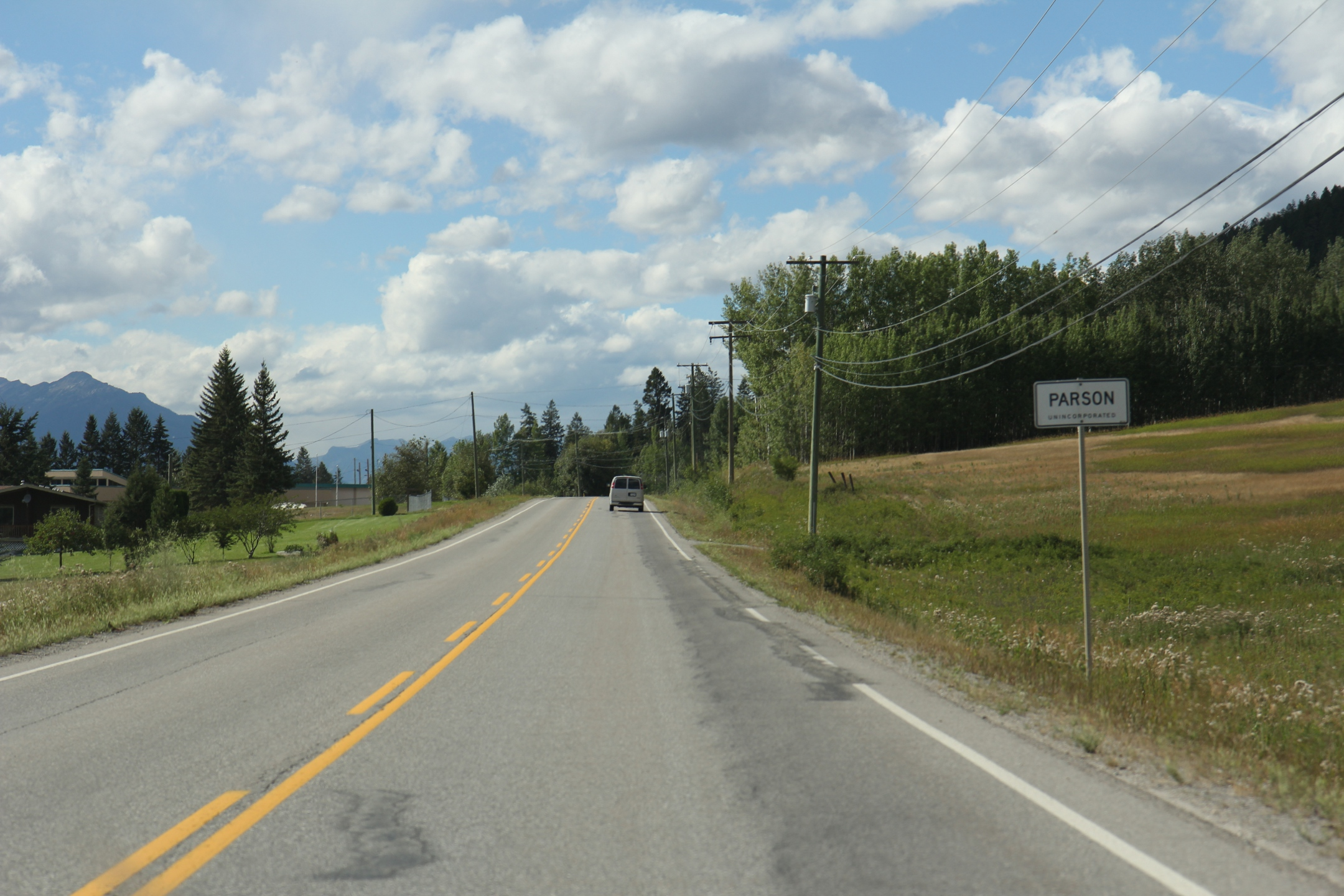
Highway northward entering Parson

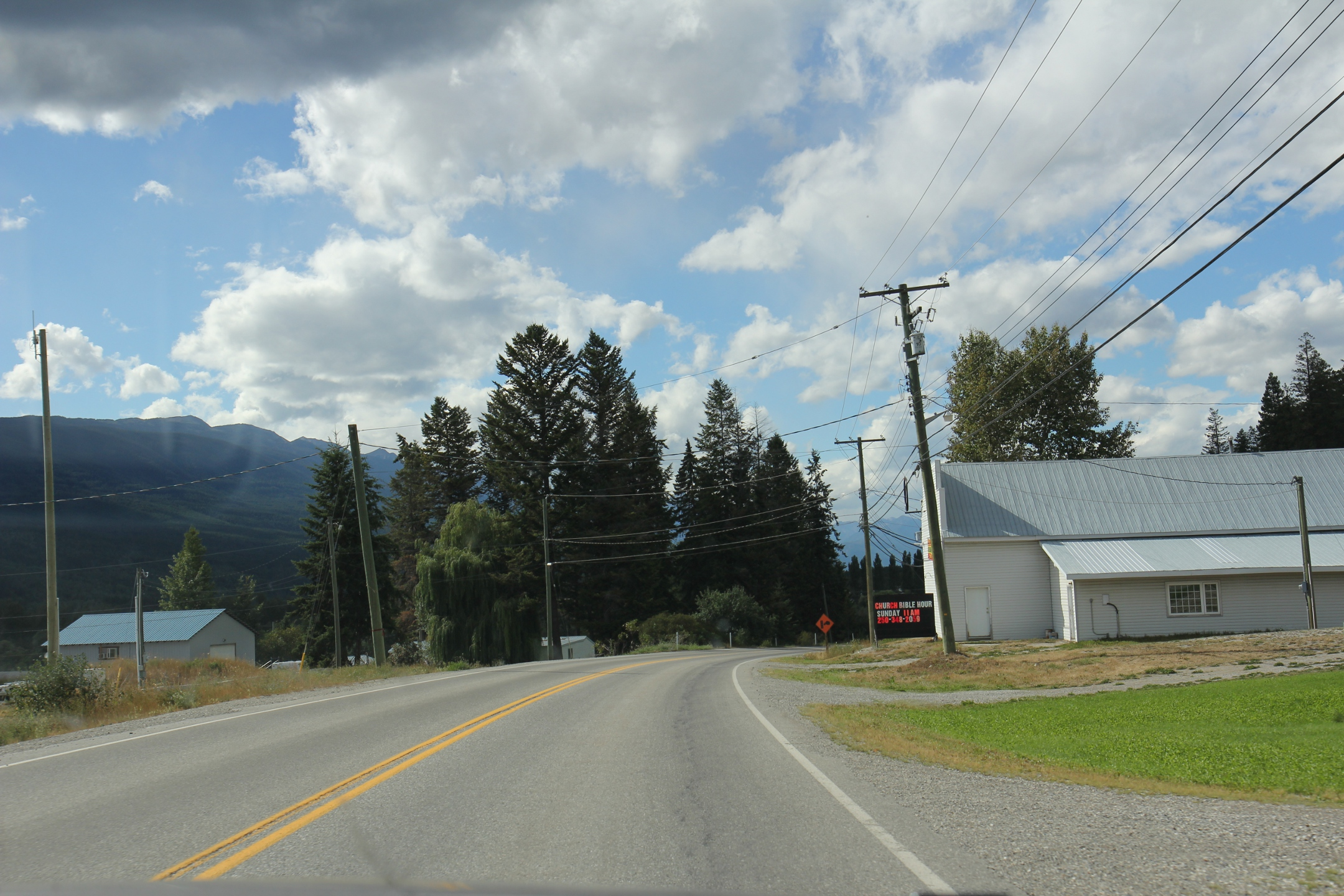
Community centre (right), Parson

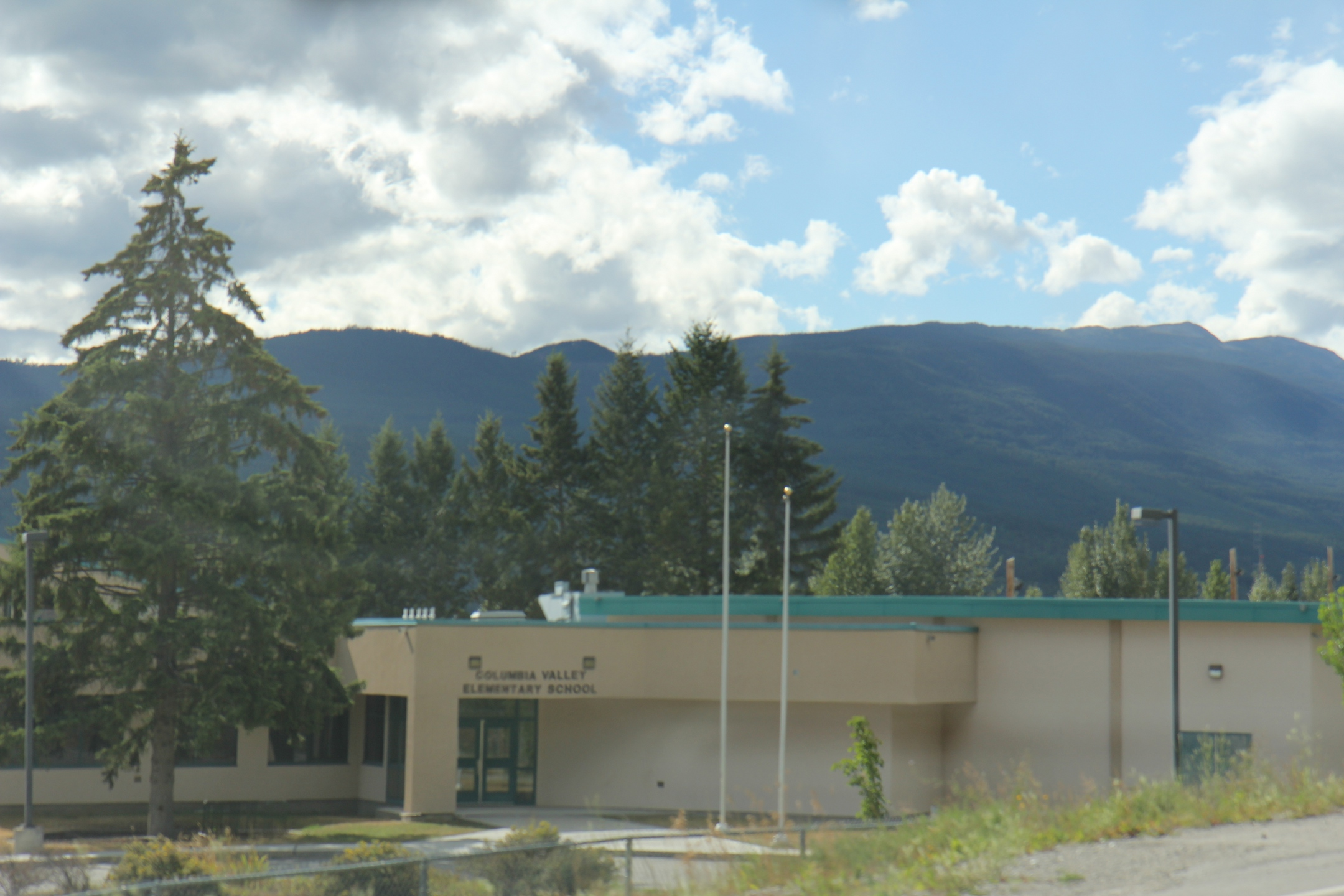
Former Columbia Valley Elementary, Parson

== Wapta ==
The former settlement was around Mile 21, which is about 3 kilometres (2 mi) northwest.

The post office operated 1904–1910. The school existed by 1906 but closed about 1921.

== McMurdo (Carbonate) ==
The settlement was around Mile 17, which is about 11 kilometres (7 mi) northwest of Parson. McMurdo delineated the east shore of the river and Carbonate both shores. Carbonate minerals were found in the area. McMurdo, derived from McMurdo Creek, which acknowledged the original discoverer of minerals in the district. The station, initially called Mallett then Mons, was a shipping point for ore. In 1925, a new station building was erected.

In the 1880s, 70 to 80 pack horses left the west bank at Carbonate Landing twice a month for the mine sites to the southwest. Although the cross river ferry is not mentioned until the early 1890s, a basic service must have existed for years. The 1894 floods destroyed a bridge across a back channel of the Columbia near the landing.

In the late 1890s, Chas. Cartwright was the proprietor of McMurdo House.

The significant ore shipments from this location had become a trickle by 1911. That year, CP cleared and subdivided the adjacent new townsite of Mallett, and a new 13-metre (44 ft) bridge was installed across a back channel.

The Carbonate ferry across the main channel was subsidized 1912–1915 and 1929–1931. During the unsubsidized intermediary period, dependable rowboats operated. When high water flooded the valley bottom, rowing upstream for a mile was essential to reach vehicles parked by the highway. In winter, traffic crossed upon the ice.

The McMurdo post office operated 1904–1953. The Old Riverboat Hotel at the landing was the home of Capt. Edwards 1927–38. Although the hotel burned down decades ago, the brick chimneys remain.

Created in 2014 and immediately south is the world's largest wooden paddle. Guinness World Records has certified the 19-metre (61 ft) curiosity resting on the hillside to the east of the highway.

== Maps ==
- "Kootenay map". library.ubc.ca. 1899. p. 1.
- Wheeler, A.G. (1911). A Guide for Mountain Climbers and Pilgrims: Map of Dogtooth Mountains (PDF). p. 158 – via us.archive.org.
- "BC map". www.davidrumsey.com. 1925.
