= Athalmer, British Columbia =

Athalmer
- Location of Athalmer in British Columbia
- Coordinates: 50°30′56″N 116°01′40″W
- Country: Canada
- Province: British Columbia
- Region: Columbia Valley/East Kootenay
- Regional district: East Kootenay
- Time zone: UTC-7 (MST)
  - Summer (DST): UTC-6 (MDT)
- Area codes: 250, 778, 236, & 672

Athalmer is an unincorporated community in the East Kootenay region of southeastern British Columbia. This place is primarily on the western shore of the Columbia River south of the mouth of Toby Creek. The locality, off the merged section of highways 93 and 95, is by road about 134 kilometres (83 mi) north of Cranbrook and 120 kilometres (75 mi) southeast of Golden.

== Name origin ==
The place was originally called Salmon Beds, being where First Nations had caught and smoked salmon for centuries. In 1887, James L. McKay established a ranch to the north in the Dry Gulch area. By 1891, his holdings included 12 hectares (30 acres) of marshy ground at Salmon Beds. In September 1898, James sold land to the Hon. Frederick Whitworth Aylmer to layout a townsite. However, the earliest newspaper report was the first of many occasions when the new name was misspelled as Athelmar. Aylmer, a son of Frederick Whitworth Aylmer, 6th Baron Aylmer, was federal district engineer prior to his 1912 retirement. Athalmer was an adaptation of his old family name of Athol (most noble) and mere (lake).

== Earlier communities ==
The North West Company trading post of Kootanae House, which existed 1807–1812, was to the north on the far shore of Toby Creek.

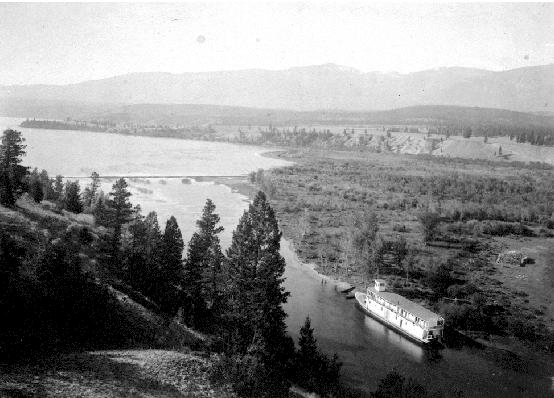
Southward, Athalmer, c.1908.

From the 1890s, mined ore was hauled down from the mountains to Athalmer for shipping by barge to Golden. By April 1899, 75 to 100 townsite lots had been purchased. Joseph J. Lake opened a large general store, and Athalmer House provided accommodation. However, most residents were living in tents, but two hotels were completed the next month. Lake was the inaugural postmaster 1899–1910. McKay installed a 4,600-metre (15,000 ft) daily capacity sawmill which produced the building lumber. About 1900, the jail was built, part of the law enforcement presence based in the community. A school existed at that time.

In 1908, a new hotel opened. The school, which closed in 1909, did not reopen until 1911. In 1910, the Windsor Hotel lost its liquor licence for illegally serving a patron on a Sunday. Soon after, James L. McKay moved his family from the ranch to temporary accommodation at the closed hotel, until their mansion by the river was ready. At the time, he either acquired or already owned the undeveloped Athalmer lots, which he promoted the next year. The Windsor reopened and the Coronation Hotel was under new management.

Athalmer was the steamboat landing from Golden. In terms of business and population, its importance exceeded Invermere, Wilmer, and Windermere.

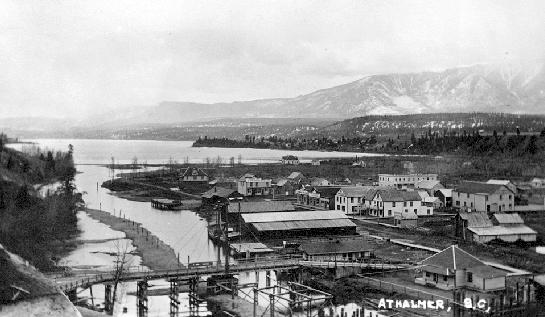
Southward, Athalmer, c.1913.

In 1912, McKay installed an electricity generating plant, which supplied street lighting and properties. Powered by cordwood-burning steam boilers, the plant was the first in the valley. That year, the Bank of Montreal established a branch, four stores existed, a garage/public hall was under construction, and the Columbia Valley Times newspaper was founded, being published at least until 1914. During these few years, the services also included two Chinese restaurants, a Chinese laundry, two brothels, a telephone operator, and two provincial police officers.

Building on the swampy ground had been a challenge. In 1915, the population was a few hundred, and the Imperial Bank established a branch. The boom ended as World War I continued. In 1917, the Bank of Montreal closed and the Imperial opened three mornings a week. Invermere, established in 1911, gained pre-eminence.

When the United Church formed in 1925, the Presbyterian church building (1912) at Athalmer became redundant. That year, the consolidated Athalmer-Invermere elementary school was established at Invermere. In 1932, the high school at Athalmer was relocated onto the Invermere campus.

In 1969, the 16-room Coronation Hotel (1907) burned to the ground.

== Ferries and bridges across the Columbia ==
By 1898, two ferries operated across the river. Assumedly, ferries continued until the bridge opened in 1900.

In 1913, a new swing bridge was completed. The next year, the old swing bridge was demolished.

In 1930, an 11-bay trestle bridge, replaced the swing span. This bridge was reconstructed in 1959 and replaced in 1986.

== Railway ==
The Kootenay Central Railway (KCR) was a Canadian Pacific Railway (CP) subsidiary. In November 1914, the last spike was driven near the north end of Columbia Lake.

Train Timetables (Regular stop or Flag stop)
	Mile	1916	1919	1929	1932	1935	1939	1943	1948	1953	1955	1960	1963
Edgewater	107.1	Regular	Regular	Regular	Regular	Regular	Regular	Regular	Regular	Regular	Regular	Mixed	Nil
Firlands	101.4	Flag	Flag										
Park Gate	101.4			Regular	Regular								
Radium	101.4					Regular	Regular	Regular	Regular	Regular	Regular	Mixed	Nil
Athalmer	92.8	Regular	Regular										
Lake Windermere	92.8			Regular	Regular	Regular	Regular	Regular	Regular	Regular	Regular	Mixed	Nil
Lake Windermere	88.7	Regular	Regular										
Goldie Creek	88.3			Flag	Flag	Flag	Flag	Flag	Flag	Flag	Flag	Mixed	Nil
Bentinck	86.1		Flag										
Lake Bank	86.1			Flag									
Strata	83.3	Flag	Flag										
Rushmere	83.3			Flag	Flag	Flag	Flag	Flag	Flag	Flag	Flag		

In January 1915, the first passenger train at the station was carrying soldiers off to war. In 1923, a log building was erected to replace the portable depot used for years. Assumedly at this time, the station name changed from Athalmer to Lake Windermere, the former station of that name having closed. Apparently, Invermere had been unhappy with the prior name of Athalmer. Consequently, CP selected Lake Windermere as a more neutral alternative. The twice weekly Cranbrook–Golden run stayed overnight at the station. In 1975, the locomotive and two cars of a northbound coal train derailed on the railway crossing and smashed into the log station building. The Windermere District Historical Society acquired the remnants, which were moved up the hill and rehabilitated to become the log building that houses the Windermere Valley Museum.

In 1980, a $560,000 highway overpass replaced the railway crossing. The 61-metre (200 ft) long structure comprises three spans. The approaches and paving cost an additional $270,000.

In 2013, an approaching train fatally clipped a pedestrian at the Borden St. crossing.

== Later community ==
The area bounded by the railway track, the western approach roading for the Columbia bridge, and the foreshore, comprises James Chabot Provincial Park and the Lake Windermere Resort lands. In 2019, the District of Invermere purchased the latter for $5 million. Open houses have been held to determine future use.

The nearest BC Transit stops are the Petro-Canada for northward travel and Sobeys (Invermere) for southward.

Athalmer primarily comprises residential and light industrial components. Housing and employment opportunities are comparable to Invermere, where area services are mainly located up on the bench.

== Images ==
Images from earlier decades.
