= Spillimacheen River =

Location
- Country: Canada
- Province: British Columbia
- District: Kootenay Land District

Physical characteristics
- Source
  - location: Near Glacier National Park
- Mouth: Columbia River
  - location: Spillimacheen
  - coordinates: 50°55′N 116°24′W
  - elevation: 784 m (2,572 ft)
- Length: 118 km (73 mi)
- Basin size: 1,430 km^{2} (550 sq mi)
- Discharge
  - average: 35 m^{3}/s (1,200 cu ft/s)
  - minimum: 2 m^{3}/s (71 cu ft/s)
  - maximum: 311 m^{3}/s (11,000 cu ft/s)

The Spillimacheen River is a tributary of the Columbia River in the Canadian province of British Columbia.

== Course ==
The Spillimacheen River originates just east of Glacier National Park. Flowing southeast, it collects the waters of several tributaries, including Baird Branch, McMurda Creek, and its main tributary, Bobbie Burns Creek, before emptying into the Columbia River near the community of Spillimacheen. The river descends over 1,800 metres (5,900 ft) over 80 kilometres (50 mi).

== Spillimacheen Dam ==
Spillimacheen Dam is a run-of-river dam on the Spillimacheen River, about 5 kilometres (3.1 mi) above the river's confluence with the Columbia. The dam was built in 1955.

== See also ==
- List of rivers of British Columbia
- Tributaries of the Columbia River
