= Old Apple Warehouse =

Landmark warehouse in Washington

Coordinates: 48°36′38″N 118°03′20″W

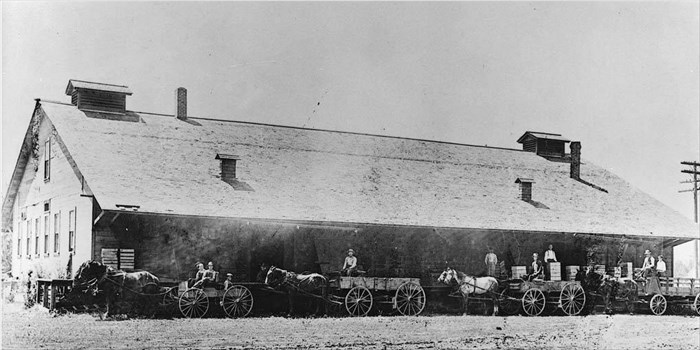
- Former names: Meyers Falls Apple Warehouse

General information
- Architectural style: Rustic
- Address: 130 E 3rd Ave
- Town or city: Kettle Falls, Washington
- Country: United States
- Current tenants: Red Apple Trading Post, Crandall Coffee Co, Meyers Falls Market
- Completed: 1906

The Old Apple Warehouse is a landmark in Kettle Falls, Washington.

== History ==
With the growth of the apple industry in Washington during the late nineteenth century, dozens of apple orchards sprung up in the area by the early 1900s. Fruit packing quickly became the main industry of Meyers Falls (now Kettle Falls).

The warehouse was built in 1906 by a co-op of orchardists, on land owned by the railroad, right next to the tracks. The building was set up so that horses with wagon loads of fruit could drive into the basement from the west end of the building, drop off their loads, and exit through the east end of the building. In 1910, an addition was built on the east end, which effectively doubled the size of the warehouse. Porches were added, and large doors were installed on both sides of the building for loading and unloading.

As an example of quantity of fruit processed in the warehouse, 40 railcars of fruit were processed through the depot in 1906. After the flooding of 1939 due to the Grand Coulee Dam, fruit processing volumes plummeted, but the warehouse was still used as the main processing and shipping point for northeastern Stevens County.

== 21st Century ==
The Old Apple Warehouse serves as a quasi-town center for Kettle Falls. Housing a grocery store, coffee company, and antique store, it is immediately recognizable when passing through the main stretch of highway of the town. In addition, the building houses a beauty parlor.

True to its name, apples are still sold in the Old Apple Warehouse from orchards that started growing in 1874.

Ron Drake, the author of the book Flip This Town, toured Kettle Falls in November 2017 and offered thoughts about how to revitalize the town. He specifically cited the Old Apple Warehouse as a historic and cultural site in Kettle Falls that could be leveraged to attract visitors.
