= Gifford–Inchelium ferry =

Means of conveyance in Washington state

Coordinates: 48.27812°N 118.14500°W

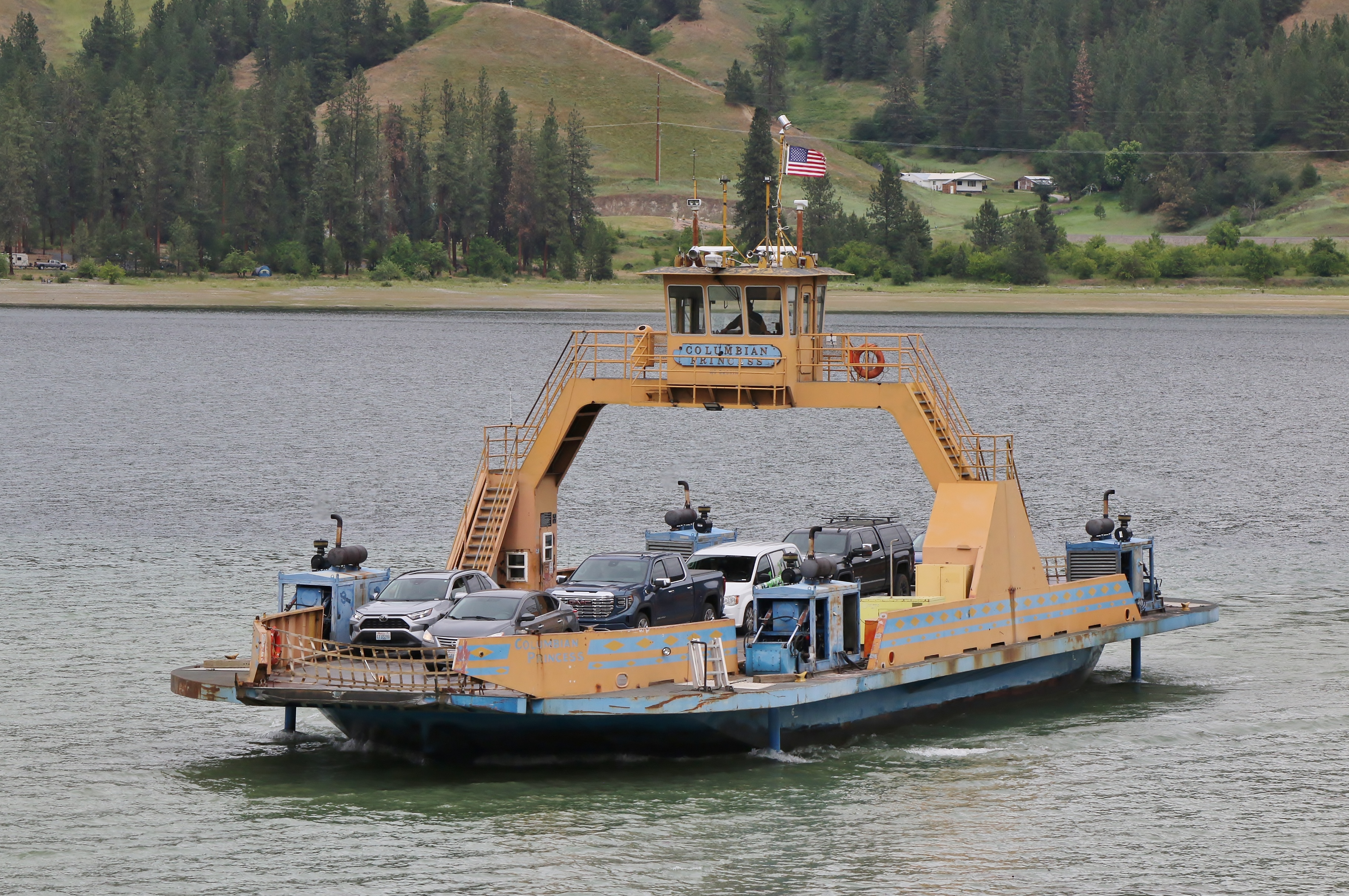
- Locale: Gifford and Inchelium
- Waterway: Roosevelt Lake (Columbia River)
- Operator: Colville Confederated Tribes
- No. of vessels: 1
- Yearly ridership: 137,731 (2024)

The Gifford–Inchelium ferry is a ferry across the Columbia River in Washington state. It connects Inchelium, Washington, to State Route 25 across the river. In 2024, the ferry carried 137,731 trips.

The Colville Confederated Tribes operate the ferry across Roosevelt Lake on the upper Columbia. The ferry was originally a private operation that began in 1898 and was expanded after the creation of Lake Franklin D. Roosevelt in 1940. It shut down in 1974 and was replaced by a new ferry, the 120-foot (37 m) Columbian Princess, in 1981 with funding from the Bureau of Indian Affairs. The contract was transferred to the tribal government in 1994. The fare to ride is free. The weight limit is 40 tons and the ferry is unable to operate when water levels drop below 1,232 feet (376 m).
