= Gifford, Washington =

Unincorporated community in Washington, United States

- Unincorporated community
- Location within Washington (state)
- Coordinates: 48°18′23″N 118°08′47″W
- Country: United States
- State: Washington
- County: Stevens
- Elevation: 1,371 ft (418 m)
- Time zone: UTC-8 (Pacific (PST))
  - Summer (DST): UTC-7 (PDT)
- ZIP code: 99131
- Area code: 509
- GNIS feature ID: 1519950

Gifford is an unincorporated community in Stevens County, Washington, United States. Gifford is located across the Columbia River from Inchelium. The community is served by Washington State Route 25 and the Gifford–Inchelium ferry. Gifford has a post office with ZIP code 99131.

Gifford was named for James O. Gifford, who settled there in 1890.

== Climate ==
This climatic region is typified by large seasonal temperature differences, with warm to hot (and often humid) summers and cold (sometimes severely cold) winters. According to the Köppen Climate Classification system, Gifford has a humid continental climate, abbreviated "Dfb" on climate maps.
