= Cedonia, Washington =

Unincorporated community in Washington, United States

- Unincorporated community
- Location within Washington (state)
- Coordinates: 48°09′14″N 118°10′09″W
- Country: United States
- State: Washington
- County: Stevens
- Elevation: 1,719 ft (524 m)
- Time zone: UTC-8 (Pacific (PST))
  - Summer (DST): UTC-7 (PDT)
- ZIP code: 99137
- Area code: 509
- GNIS feature ID: 1510867

Cedonia (pronounced sĕh-dōn-ya) is a small unincorporated community in Stevens County, Washington, United States. Formerly a town, it lies in the valley of the Columbia River, on the western slope of hills known as Summit Mines, at a river section known as Lake Roosevelt, a reservoir created by Grand Coulee Dam. Washington State Route 25 is the primary transportation arterial in the community.

The area surrounding it is primarily a farming and ranching community with some logging activity. Cedonia includes the Ye Olde Country Store, a veterinary clinic, and several homes. The Cedonia Community Church lies just outside the city limits. The church is also the source of the name Cedonia. When it was built in 1897, the settlers searched for a name for their community. They settled on the name Cedonia, a shortened version of Macedonia.

Education services are provided by Columbia High School in Hunters, Washington, about three miles due south of Cedonia.

Huckleberry Mountain of the Selkirk Mountains rises to the east of the community and the Kettle River Range of the Monashee Mountains lie across the Columbia River from Cedonia.
