= Spillimacheen =

- Location of Spillimacheen in British Columbia
- Coordinates: 50°53′59″N 116°22′04″W
- Country: Canada
- Province: British Columbia
- Region: Columbia Valley/East Kootenay
- Regional district: East Kootenay
- Time zone: UTC-7 (MST)
  - Summer (DST): UTC-6 (MDT)
- Area codes: 250, 778, 236, & 672
- Highways: Highway 95

Spillimacheen is an unincorporated community near the mouth of the Spillimacheen River on the east shore of the Columbia River, in the East Kootenay region of southeastern British Columbia. The locality, on BC Highway 95, is by road about 183 kilometres (114 mi) north of Cranbrook and 64 kilometres (40 mi) southeast of Golden.

== Name origin ==
The First Nations word origins suggest a meaning of "flat mouth," "'flat meadow," or "meeting of the waters." The earliest mention of the name was 1864, when applied to the river mouth and then to the river. The two most common spellings were Spillimacheen and Spillimachene. The riverboat landing was an access point to the mining country westward across the Columbia.

Peter McIntyre was the inaugural postmaster 1889–1889, followed by George McMillan 1889–1909. McMillan, who had arrived the prior year, named his farm after the galena ore found in the area. Consequently, the post office and the general area adopted the Galena name. The 1898 voters' list combined all residents as Galena. The 1907 list comprised separate sections for Spillimacheen, Brisco, and Galena (the undefined area spanning the gap).

== Mining ==
Reputedly, the first BC smelter was erected by prospector John McRae at the river mouth on the western shore of the Columbia in 1883. Having processed silver lead ore, the smelter was dismantled in 1906.

The Giant Mascot Mine comprised the Giant, Giant Mineral, Silver Giant, and Giant Mascot claims on the southwest side of Spillimacheen Mountain. In 1883, Albert Isaaco, W. Isaaco and Thomas (Tom) Jones made the initial stake, but developments during the 1890s were not promising. In 1907, Golden Giant Mine Ltd was more successful, extracting 500 tons of silver lead ore in 1908. Apart from 77 tons shipped in 1917 and some diamond exploration during 1926–1928, the mine was inactive until after World War II. Silver Giant Mines shipped 1,383 tons in 1947, and in partnership with Hedley Mascot Gold Mines was producing 500 tons per day by 1952. The mining camp expanded from six families in 1951 to include 40 houses, a school, and a community hall by 1954. When the mine closed in 1957, the population dispersed. Baroid of Canada continued baryte operations 1959–1966.

Other claims listed on the mountain in 1898 included Rothchilds and Hidden Treasure. At that time on Bugaboo Creek were Last Chance, Surprise, France, Magda, Hortense, June Bug, Riverside, No. 21, and Western Cross.

== Waterway and roads ==
From the mid-1880s, steamboats provided a vital link on the Upper Columbia. In 1887, the Cline sank near Spillimacheen, while carrying equipment for the NWMP. An alternative name was Jubilee Landing, which by river was 74 kilometres (46 mi) from Golden. Galena Landing was about 4 kilometres (2.5 mi) farther southeast.

During the early 1890s, Galena was an important stop on the steamer timetable. However, river ice shut down river traffic from December to April. A Golden–Fort Steele stage ran twice a month but the journey was rugged. Prior to the stages, pack trains followed the trail along the foot of the Rockies.

In 1899, the respective mileposts from Golden were Carbonate (16), Hog Ranch (23), Spillimachene (41), Shorty's (49), McKay's (66), Sinclair (68), and Windermere (82). In 1911, the listed stopping places from Golden were Hadden's (13), Johnson's (18), McKeeman's (29), Spillimacheen (41), Dolan's (54), and Windermere (82).

By 1892, Malcolm and Rosella Cameron were part owners of a Spillimacheen hotel. By 1894, Peter Lambrich was the proprietor of Riverside House at Mile 41. By 1897, J. Francis (Frank) and Jessie Deacon ran the renamed Spillimacheen Hotel. Following his mining and farming activities, Tom Jones was the proprietor by 1899. William and Diana Barry purchased the place around 1900, described in 1909 as a little tavern along the rough narrow trail. In 1912, the liquor licence was revoked. The next year, the hotel was demolished for the railway right-of-way.

In 1884, the government called tenders for a ferry across the Columbia at Spillimacheen, which commenced operations at that time. In 1896, P. Lambridge (Lambrich alternative spelling) built a large scow ferry. The ferry was subsidized 1908–1912. Being unstaffed, passengers moved the vessel by pulling on the cable. The 1912 replacement was a manned swing bridge, which comprised a 29-metre (95 ft) swing span, with an adjoining 19-metre (63 ft) king post truss. The bridge was upgraded in the early 1930s, and a running deck installed two decades later. The bridge was reconstructed in the late 1950s and replaced by a concrete structure in the late 1990s.

In 1950, Highway 4 was renumbered as Highway 95, which was rebuilt in the late 1950s and paving was completed in 1962.

== Earlier community ==
In 1886, only a couple of cabins existed at Spillimacheen Landing. By 1893, opposite Galena Landing, Harry Barr owned 129 hectares (320 acres) on Bugaboo Creek, which he sold to James Montgomery in 1897.

Erected on land donated by George McMillan from his Galena farm, the school adopted the Galena name. In 1904, Miss B.O. Frazer was the inaugural teacher. Insufficient student numbers prompted closures during 1924–1926, 1943–1946, 1947–1949, and permanently in 1971.

In 1912, Thomas Alton built a dance hall on his property. However, the large train station at Spillimacheen, built in 1913, soon became the venue for community dances.

When Hugh McDonald opened the first general store in 1913, the post office moved to a permanent location. In 1921, the name changed to Spillimachene General Store. By 1940, when called the Trading Post, a Texaco and an Imperial gas pump stood at the front. In the 1950s, a coffee shop and tourist cabins were added, but the store permanently closed in the 1980s. During the late 1930s, Clyde and Dorothy Ambrose operated a small store for a short period near the Westside Road junction. In 1948, Joe and Olga Roesch bought in this location, installing two Shell gas pumps in the early 1950s and adding a general store in 1954, which traded as Bug-a-boo Service. Spare rooms in their large house were let to lodgers. In 1977, Doug and Lorraine Bolton bought the business and property, which operated for a few years before closing. The vacant buildings still stand.

About 1900, the Federal government installed a telephone line from Golden, which would link to Windermere. Although still party lines, capacity increased substantially when BC Tel expanded into the area in 1968/69. An automatic exchange brought privacy to calls in 1997.

During the 1940s, the Alpine Club of Canada operated a base at Spillimacheen.

In 1946, when the post office name was changed from Galena, the local intention was for Spillimachene, but the Ottawa authorities inadvertently chose Spillimacheen, the spelling which endured.

In 1954, Jim and Kay Paul started Jim's Service using a couple of small buildings and a small gravity gas pump. The next year, a new building was erected with a shop, hoist, office, and electric pump.

In 1955, the opening of the Spillimacheen Dam brought electricity. Founded the prior year, the Spillimacheen-Columbia Valley Country Club organized card parties and dances. In 1958, a steel building was erected to house the community hall. By the 1980s, the community had shrunk and the building had deteriorated, being removed in 1990.

== Forestry ==
In 1902, Robert (Bob) H. and Minnie Milligan arrived. Bob logged on the Spillimacheen and Bugaboo rivers, rafting the logs downstream to Golden. The couple left in 1910.

In 1907, Thomas and Jennie Alton settled. He moved his steam-powered sawmill to available stands of trees. In 1922, his operations relocated to Harrogate.

During the 1930s and 1940s, small mills were operated by Pat Magrath, Charlie Ross & Hoffman, and Joe Roesch.

In 1950, E. Peter Nelson (son of Einar and Beatrice Nelson of Brisco) established a sawmill in partnership with Doug Stewart, whom he bought out in 1961. This major mill still operates.

In 1952, the Spillimacheen Ranger District was formed. Over the next two years, an office/warehouse and staff houses were erected. A 1974 amalgamation reduced the presence to a skeletal staff. The station closed in 1986.

== Railway ==
The Kootenay Central Railway (KCR) was a Canadian Pacific Railway (CP) subsidiary. In 1912, CP bought the Spillimacheen ranches of George McMillan and William Barry. The latter 30 hectares (75 acres) was to create the main townsite between Golden and Lake Windermere. Oswald J. Curtis sold 20 hectares (50 acres) of his farm for the Brisco townsite.

The southward advance of the rail head from Golden reached Spillimacheen in early January 1913 and the large Spillimacheen station was built that year. The location became the temporary terminus for a couple of years and the track condition from Golden restricted the mixed train to 16 kilometres per hour (10 mph).

During 1914, Capt. Frank P. Armstrong used scows to move railway construction workers, supplies, and steam shovels, between Spillimacheen and Columbia Lake. Ponds Construction was the subcontractor for Burns and Jorden on the Brisco portion. Horse- or mule-drawn equipment moved earth to build up the road bed through the large marshlands on the way to Luxor. On completion, the old machinery was abandoned near the Brisco school. The station and section house at Brisco were both small. In 1920, a proper house was built, as was the case at Luxor a year or two later.

In September 1914, a tri-weekly Golden to Edgewater service commenced, and the southeastward rail head was about 10-kilometre (6 mi) northwest of Windermere. That November, the last spike was driven near the north end of Columbia Lake. The commencement of through train service in January 1915 ended stage and riverboat traffic.

In 1931, the twice weekly service was reduced to once weekly.

Train Timetables (Regular stop or Flag stop)
	Mile	1913	1916	1919	1929	1932	1935	1939	1943	1948	1953	1955	1960	1963
Ref.														
Harrogate	132.6	Regular	Flag	Flag	Regular	Regular	Regular	Regular	Regular	Regular	Regular	Regular	Mixed	Nil
Spillimacheen	125.6	Regular	Regular	Regular	Regular	Regular	Regular	Regular	Regular	Regular	Regular	Regular	Mixed	Nil
Brisco	117.9		Flag	Flag	Regular	Regular	Regular	Regular	Regular	Regular	Regular	Regular	Mixed	Nil
Luxor	112.1		Flag	Flag	Regular	Regular	Flag	Flag	Flag	Flag	Flag	Flag	Mixed	Nil
Edgewater	107.1		Regular	Regular	Regular	Regular	Regular	Regular	Regular	Regular	Regular	Regular	Mixed	Nil

== Later community ==
In the mid-1980s, Joseph Lehman, Glenys Snow, and a small group arrived to establish the Columbia Society of Interdependent Living (Columbia S.O.I.L.). The society, which incorporates both environmental and disability issues, has liaised with federal and provincial parks to improve access for people with disabilities and the elderly. Also, the organization has secured 12 hectares (30 acres) of the former township centre of Spillimacheen to create a model community.

In 1986, George and Laquita Rollins arrived and opened Turtle Island Gift Shop. In 1992, they helped in-laws Dennis and Nola Alt establish Spilli-Station Café. The café changed hands through the years, but Nola was actively involved during the late 2010s, before new owners Bernie and Patty Derbyshire took over in 2020.

In 2006, the historic Spillimacheen Trading Post reopened as a retail honey outlet called Beeland.

In 2022, the federal government made a grant to install high-speed internet.

== Notable people ==
- George Overton (1880–1957), painter, was a resident 1938–1954.

== Maps ==
- "Kootenay map". library.ubc.ca. 1899. p. 1.
- "BC map". www.davidrumsey.com. 1925.
