= Mattawa Ropeway Conveyor =

Ropeway conveyor in Washington

Coordinates: 46.62684°N 119.864298°W

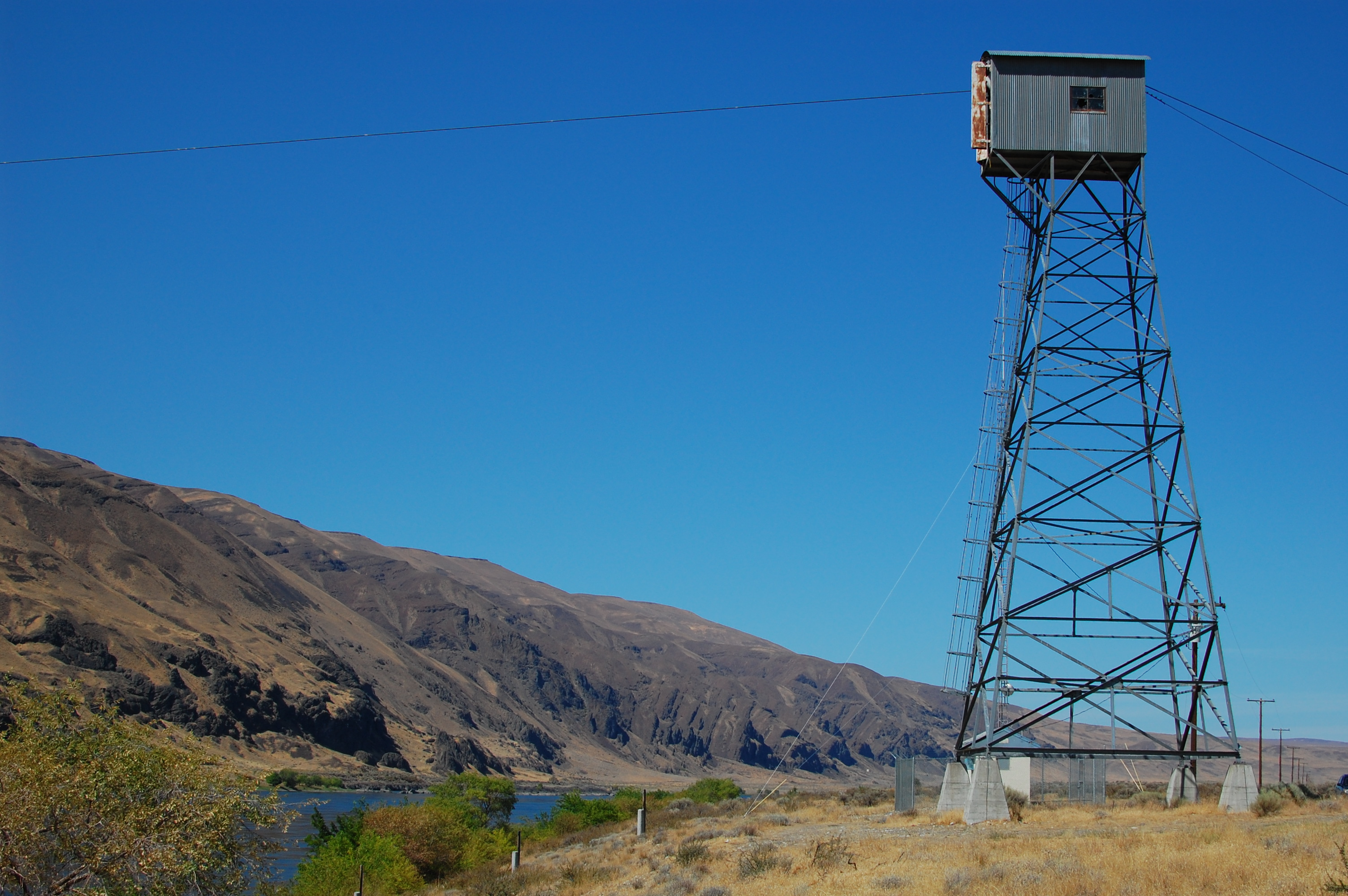

The Mattawa Ropeway Conveyor is a disused ropeway conveyor that crosses the Columbia River. It links Mattawa, Washington to the previous Department of Energy lands west of the Hanford Site. The main mechanism is on the north (Mattawa) side of the river.
