= Dry Gulch Provincial Park =

Provincial park in British Columbia, Canada

- IUCN category II (national park)
- Location within British Columbia
- Interactive map of Dry Gulch Provincial Park
- Location: Kootenay Land District, British Columbia, Canada
- Nearest city: Invermere, BC
- Coordinates: 50°35′09″N 116°02′19″W
- Area: 29 ha (72 acres)
- Established: March 16, 1956
- Governing body: BC Parks

Dry Gulch Provincial Park is a provincial park in British Columbia, Canada.
