= Brisco, British Columbia =

Brisco
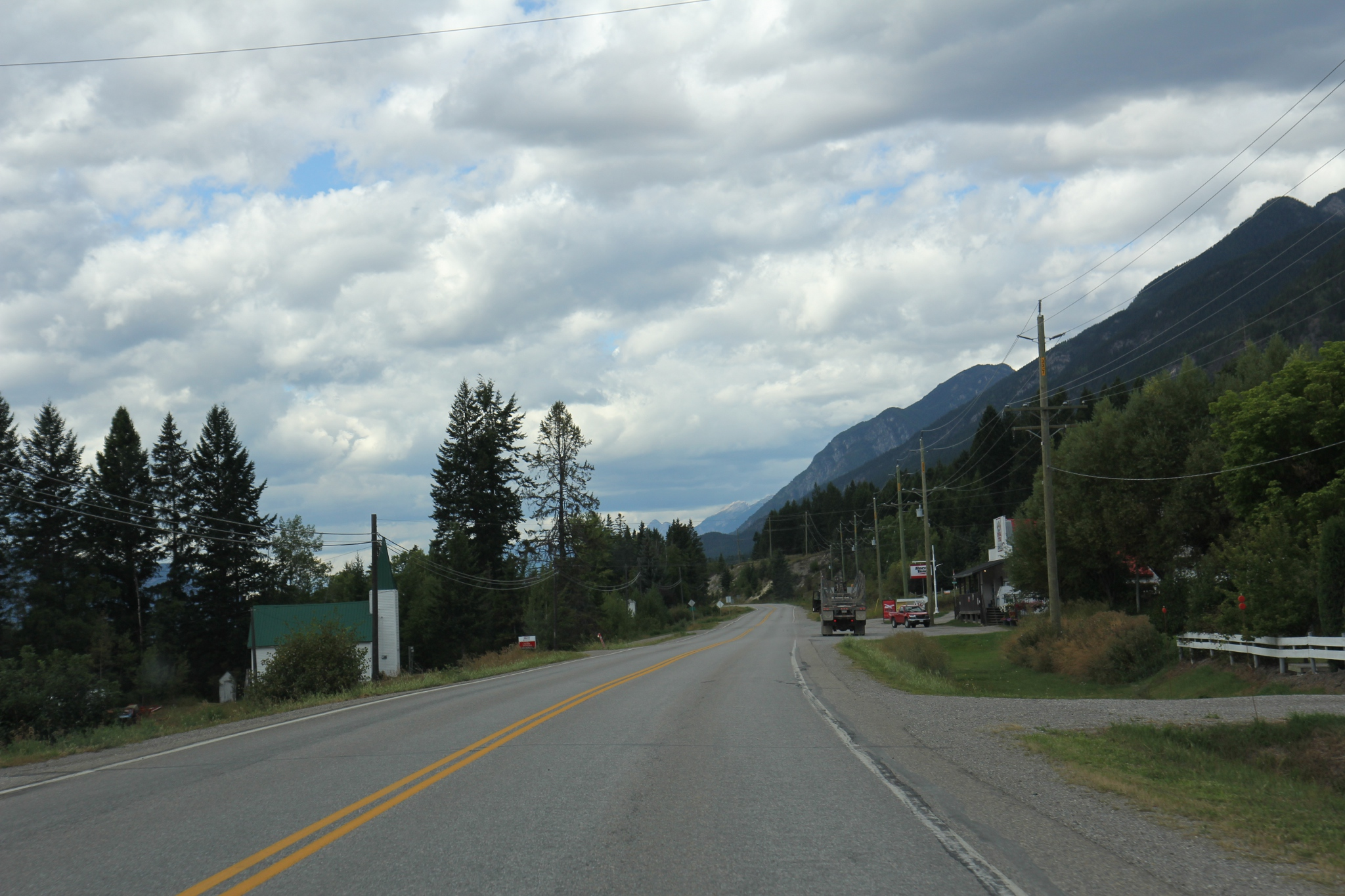
- Highway northward through downtown Brisco

- Location of Brisco in British Columbia
- Coordinates: 50°49′59″N 116°16′03″W
- Country: Canada
- Province: British Columbia
- Region: Columbia Valley/East Kootenay
- Regional district: East Kootenay
- Time zone: UTC-7 (MST)
  - Summer (DST): UTC-6 (MDT)
- Postal code: V0A 1B0
- Area codes: 250, 778, 236, & 672
- Highways: Highway 95

Brisco is an unincorporated community on the east shore of the Columbia River, in the East Kootenay region of southeastern British Columbia. The locality, on BC Highway 95, is by road about 172 kilometres (107 mi) north of Cranbrook and 75 kilometres (47 mi) southeast of Golden.

== Name origin ==
The adoption most likely derives from the Brisco Range, the name recorded on an 1863 map. Capt. Arthur Brisco, 11th Hussars, a hero of the Charge of the Light Brigade, was a friend of John Palliser, whom he joined on the 1858–59 expedition.

Daniel (Danny) Campbell, who arrived in the late 1880s, was the inaugural postmaster 1895–1898; 1901–1920. The 1898 voters' list combined all residents as Galena. The 1907 list comprised separate sections for Spillimacheen, Brisco, and Galena (the undefined area spanning the gap). Initially called Columbia Valley, the post office was renamed Brisco in 1899.

== Mining ==
In 1893, Capt. Francis Armstrong staked two claims (named after his daughters Ruth and Charlotte) at the head of Vermont Creek, a tributary of Vowell Creek. Over the decades, access was a problem and activity sporadic. In 1960, the road was rebuilt and the first concentrate was shipped in 1969. A snowslide, which wiped out the powerhouse and some buildings, ended operations in 1974. Later activity is unclear.

In the early 1900s, Tom Brown staked the Lead Queen claim near the head of Frances Creek, which he sold for $5,000. Operating for about a decade, the mine closed in 1928.

In the 1930s, John and Gordon Hart discovered a baryte site on Templeton River about 8 kilometres (5 mi) by road from Brisco. Ralph A. Thrall, who acquired the rights in 1939, formed Mountain Minerals Ltd, which crushed the product until closing in the late 1980s.

== Ferries and roads ==
Early transportation was similar to Spillimacheen. The riverboat stop was called Steamboat Landing. Whisky Hill, on the old wagon road north of Brisco, gained its name from a pack train around 1880. A mule fell over the bank while carrying three kegs of whisky.

In 1891, Harry (Shorty) Atchison settled. By 1899, he was running a stage stopping place on his preemption at Mile 49. George Mitchell, nephew of Alfred Mitchell, pre-empted 129 hectares (320 acres) in 1902. George sold land to his brothers Mac and Fred Mitchell in 1909, where they established a stopping house. Although mainly serving meals, overnight accommodation was available.

The ferry service across the Columbia was subsidized 1912–1921. By the mid-1910s, upper and lower cable ferries existed, which passengers moved by pulling on a cable, because the small vessels were unstaffed.

In 1921, a pre-used 46-metre (150 ft) howe truss was erected over the Columbia, but only the upper ferry operated during the final months of construction. In 1944, a 110-metre (360 ft) pile trestle bridge replaced the previous structure.

== Railway ==
Railway development largely mirrored Spillimacheen.

== Earlier community ==
About 1889, Thomas F. Pirie settled, calling his property Grand View Farm. In 1893, he dissolved a business partnership with C.A. Watt and married Agnes Ruddick. After Agnes died in 1903, he left.

In 1891, Edward (Ed) Watkins pre-empted land, which he worked in partnership with his brother Will. In 1896, he married Lavina Walker. Mainly cattle farmers, they remained until their deaths in the early 1940s. About 1891, William Benson (Ben) Able arrived and worked on the Watkins farm. He later acquired 81 hectares (200 acres) across from that farm, which he called Meadow Ranch. He bought expensive farm equipment, built a huge barn, and dyked about 20 hectares (50 acres). When the 1894 flood broke the dykes, his farming interest diminished. Ben Abel Creek and Abel Creek bear his name.

About 1896, Alfred Mitchell came and pre-empted the Fortress Ranch. In 1900, he married Anne Tegert. They raised cattle, sheep, horses, and hundreds of chickens.

Erected on land donated by Ed Watkins, the first school opened in fall 1905. George K. Thorpe was the inaugural teacher. The building was replaced in 1920 and 1950. On closure in 1972, students were bussed to Edgewater.

While situated on farms, post office facilities were rudimentary. Archie Wolfenden purchased 4 hectares (10 acres) from Ernie Cobb to erect a general store, which opened in 1911. The post office moved to the store in 1920. The next year, William and Christina Blair bought the business. They built several tourist cabins on the property and established another store at Edgewater. From 1946, a line of proprietors followed.

In 1911, Einar Nelson purchased 1 hectare (2 acres) from Harry Atchison, where he built a blacksmith shop and house. After marrying Beatrice Kerr in 1922, he continued as a blacksmith and vehicle mechanic. About 1926, he erected a two-storey building. On these larger premises, downstairs comprised the garage, and upstairs hosted dances and badminton until the community hall opened. He later built another blacksmith shop and rental cabins. About 1937, he built a small general store beside the garage, later adding an ice cream parlour at the rear.

In 1925, Ted and Ethel Mercer owned the first radio, which on clear evenings could receive signals from Calgary and some US cities.

The community hall, which opened near the store in 1930, hosted dances and screened silent movies. A highway upgrade in 1956 required the hall to be moved from the new right-of-way. The Brisco United church was built in 1954 on land donated by Ernest Froese.

In 1933, 1934, and 1935, the Brisco Stampede was held.

== Agriculture ==
Founded in 1922, the Brisco Farmers Institute initially promoted potato crops. The railway and better roads had opened up new markets. Dairy farmers made regular shipments to the Invermere creamery from 1920 and the Golden creamery from 1922. Loading corrals were installed at the station for shipping cattle.

Paul and Ingrid Hambruch purchased a property in 1957 and built greenhouses from 1958 onward to grow bedding plants. They opened the Golden flower shop in 1961 and bought the Invermere one in 1969.

== Forestry ==
During 1913–1915, Thomas Alton of Spillimacheen logged on George Mitchell's ranch. His steam-powered mill produced lumber for railway culverts, bridges, and ties.

During the 1920s, Bill McCreary operated a portable mill on the west shore of the river.

From the 1930s to 1980s, the Hofert Xmas Tree Co. and Kirk Xmas Tree Co. bought, grew, and shipped the seasonal product from the area to US markets.

In the mid-1940s, Ernest Tretheway ran a small mill on the far shore. In the late 1940s, he relocated a failing steam-powered mill from Spillimacheen, eventually selling the operation to Abe Neufeld who ran it for few more years.

In 1948, Jim Stone and Dick Gillis established the Stone and Gillis sawmill. The enterprise was sold to Cypress Mines in 1965 and Ken and George Lautrup (operating as Brisco Sawmills) in 1970. After fire destroyed the mill in 1983, Evans Products bought the assets. In 1984, George and Jeanette Lautrup established Brisco Wood Preservers, adding a sawmill in 1987. Producing utility poles since 1989, the company expanded into specially designed wood beams, columns, and panels in 2002.

In 1980, Bob and Claudia Mitchell, sold their outfitting business and established a sawmill. In 2000, son Owen took over, operating as Owen Mitchell Enterprises. In 2016, his son Jasper became owner, running the mill as Mitchell Wood Products.

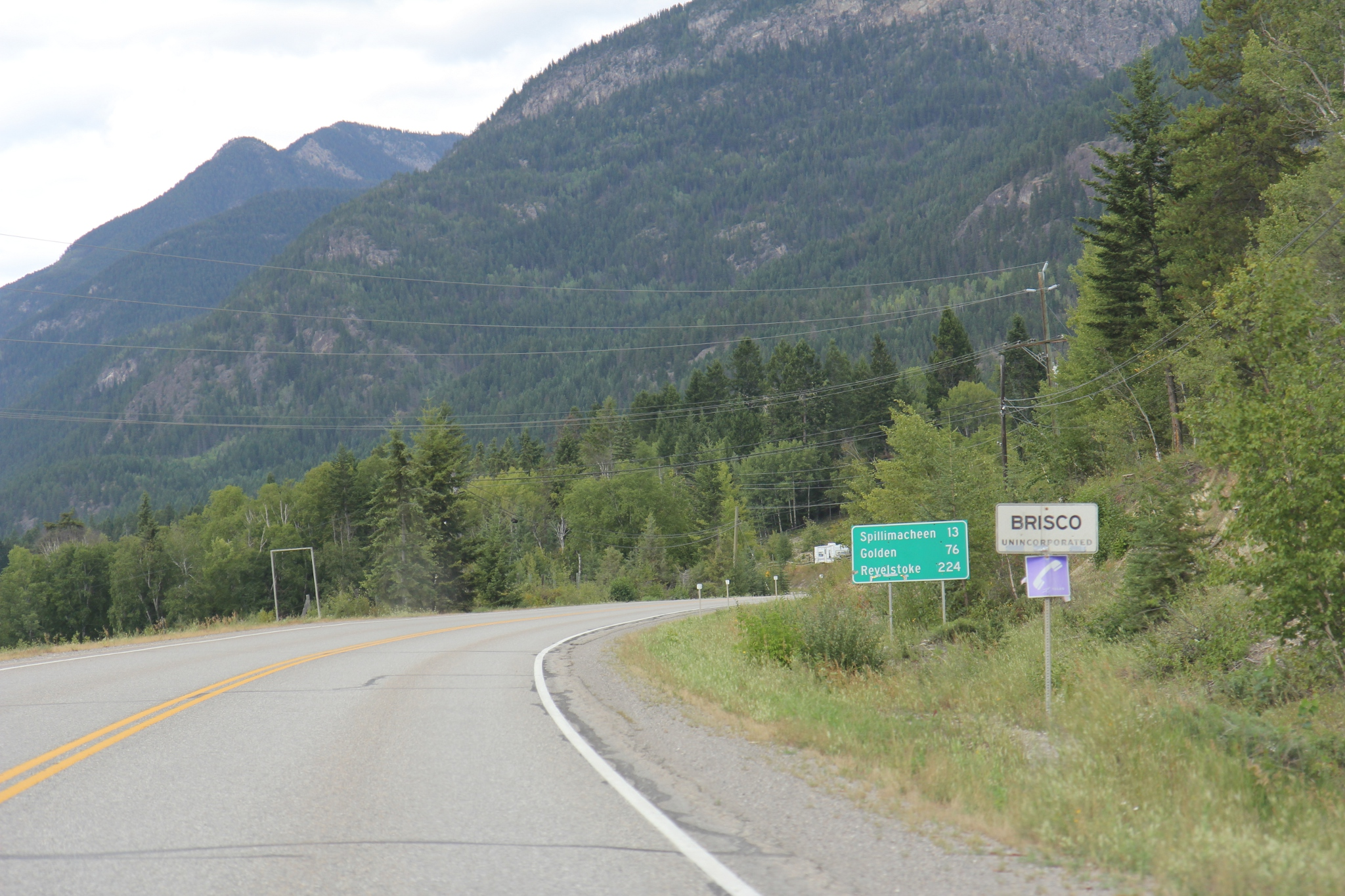
Highway northward entering Brisco

== Later community ==
To improve TV reception, the Brisco Recreation Commission (BRC) installed a repeater at Spillimacheen in 1977. The BRC purchased the old school for $1 in 1989.

On the southern perimeter are the relocated Addison's Bungalows.

Many community events are no longer held because the BRC has been unable to attract sufficient volunteers. The dedicated few oversee the community hall, former United church, and the Galena church and cemetery.

In 2022, the general store/post office/liquor outlet/gas bar was advertised for sale.

== Galena church ==
St. Mark's church, the oldest in the valley, is about 5 kilometres (3 mi) northwest of Brisco.

Thomas F. Pirie provided the land upon which volunteers erected the little log building in 1896. The cemetery includes many pioneer graves. The land was bought by John Fraser, a nephew of Rev. James Fraser (Presbyterian) in 1903, and by Fred Thatcher, son of Rev. E.G. Thatcher (Anglican) in 1919. Fred deeded the property to the Anglican Church, Invermere in 1945.

In 1902, a death from suicide was buried outside the cemetery grounds. When later replaced, the fence line was moved outward to include this grave. In 1952, the first wedding ceremony took place.

In 1990, The church was renovated. In 1996, 250 people attended a centenary celebration. In 2013, an unknown visitor who lit the stove caused a chimney fire, which a passerby extinguished. Five months later, the building and cemetery were vandalized.

== Spur Valley ==
About 9 kilometres (6 mi) southeast of Brisco, Dave Mormon ran a stopping place on North Vermilion Creek in the early 1900s. The stream was later renamed Luxor Creek. He appears to have abandoned the place in 1904. Designated as Mile 54, the Harrison stop existed by 1907. This does not seem to be Stanley and Lilian Harrison, who were about 4 kilometres (2 mi) northwest at Deadman Creek, later renamed Body Creek. Mert and Pearl Dolan resided on Vermilion Creek about 1910–1918. Dolan's was listed as the Mile 54 stop in 1911.

The Luxor train station was just north of Luxor Creek.

The Mormon property was acquired by Becan Ashton in 1907, Joe and Louise Daniken in 1928, Tex Vernon-Wood in 1946, and Art Szabo in 1957, who changed the name from North Vermilion Creek to Spur Valley. He developed part as a resort and subdivided the rest. In 1984, Gus and Maye Csokonay bought the resort, which they upgraded to include cabins, a motel, RV sites, and a campground. In 1997, a 9-hole golf course was added. In 1984, teams of forest firefighters were successful in containing a blaze on an adjacent hillside.

Groundwater is chlorinated and pumped into two reservoirs before distribution to residents.
