= Grand Coulee Bridge =

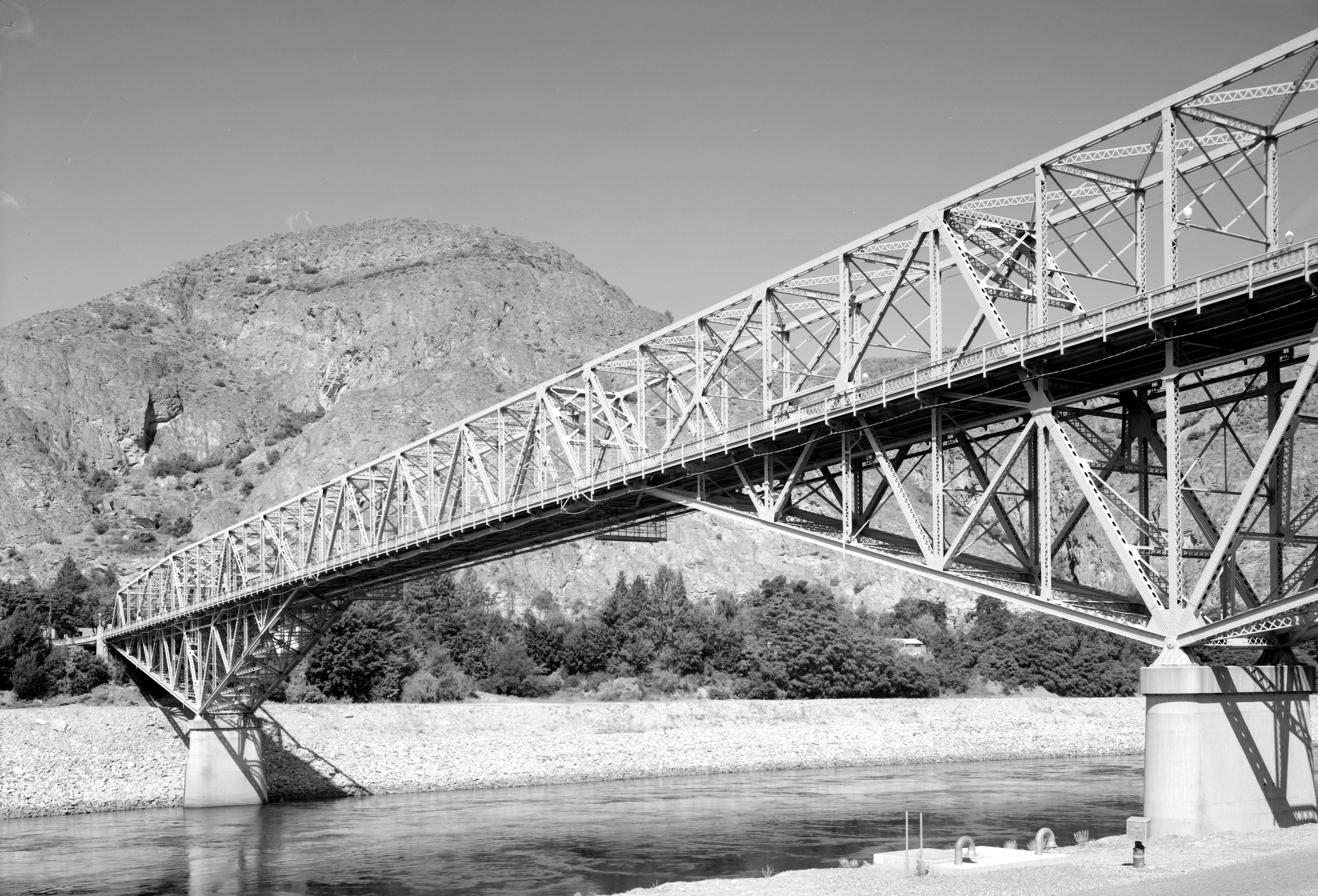
- Coordinates: 47°57′56″N 118°58′56″W
- Carries: SR 155
- Crosses: Columbia River

Characteristics
- Design: Through cantilever truss
- Material: Concrete and steel
- Total length: 1,089 ft (331.9 m)
- Longest span: 565 ft (172.2 m)

History
- Opened: 1935
- Grand Coulee Bridge
- U.S. National Register of Historic Places
- Location: Spans Columbia River, Coulee Dam, Washington
- Built: 1934–1935
- Architect: Washington Department of Highways
- MPS: Historic Bridges/Tunnels in Washington State TR
- NRHP reference No.: 82004267
- Added to NRHP: July 16, 1982

Location
- Interactive map of Grand Coulee Bridge

The Grand Coulee Bridge, or Columbia River Bridge at Grand Coulee Dam, is a through-cantilever steel truss bridge built in 1934–35. It carries State Route 155 across the Columbia River immediately below Grand Coulee Dam, near the city of Grand Coulee, Washington. It was added to the National Register of Historic Places in 1982.

The bridge was built to transport heavy equipment across the Columbia River during the construction of the dam, and thereafter as a permanent highway bridge. As such, it was designed to carry a heavier load than was typical. The bridge is supported by two concrete piers, about 150 feet (46 m) high. During construction, one of the piers began to tilt, probably due to fine glacial material under the gravel. Additional supports were added as a temporary measure. It employed between 1,000 and 1,200 men. The piers were later taken down to bedrock using pneumatic caissons.

== See also ==
- List of bridges documented by the Historic American Engineering Record in Washington (state)
- List of bridges on the National Register of Historic Places in Washington (state)
