= Kettle Falls, Washington =

- City
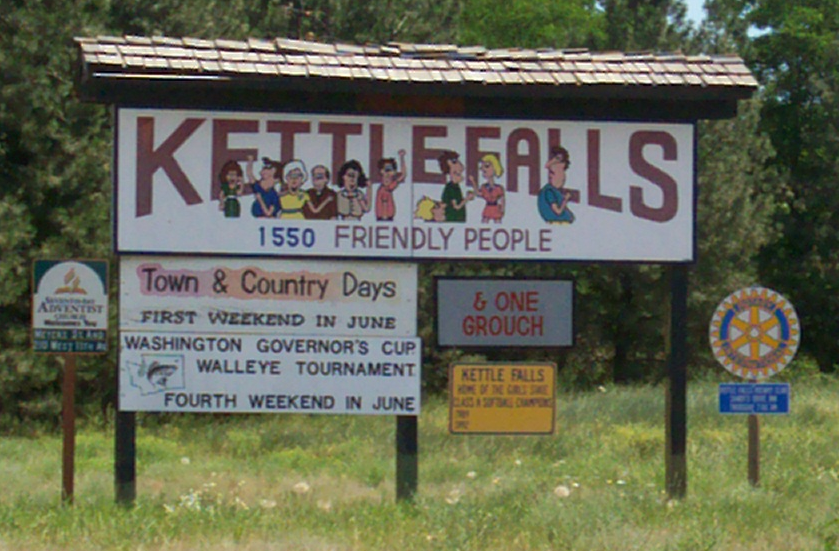
- Welcome sign at the northern end of the city
- Interactive map of Kettle Falls, Washington
- Coordinates: 48.605551°N 118.062098°W
- Country: United States
- State: Washington
- County: Stevens
- Incorporated: December 17, 1891
- Named for: Kettle Falls

Government
  - Type: Mayor–council
  - Mayor: Jesse Garrett
  - City Council: Shellee Haynes; John Ridlington; Chris Shurrum; Cliff King; Michael Weatherman

Area
  - Total: 1.114 sq mi (2.886 km^{2})
  - Land: 1.114 sq mi (2.886 km^{2})
  - Water: 0 sq mi (0.000 km^{2}) 0.0%
- Elevation: 1,627 ft (496 m)

Population (2020)
  - Total: 1,636
  - Estimate (2024): 1,649
  - Density: 1,486.9/sq mi (574.09/km^{2})
- Time zone: UTC−8 (Pacific (PST))
  - Summer (DST): UTC−7 (PDT)
- ZIP Code: 99141
- Area code: 509
- FIPS code: 53-35485
- GNIS feature ID: 2411540
- Website: cityofkettlefalls.org

Kettle Falls is a city in Stevens County, Washington, United States, named for the Kettle Falls on the Columbia River, which was submerged after Grand Coulee Dam was built. The city itself is located on the Colville River immediately upstream from its confluence with the Columbia River. The population was 1,636 at the 2020 census, and was estimated at 1,649 in 2024.

== History ==
The original Kettle Falls was officially incorporated on December 17, 1891, on the bank of the Columbia. Before it was flooded by the Grand Coulee Dam in 1940, city planners relocated the town at a community called Meyers Falls, near the railroad lines, helping to ensure its success as a trans-shipment point for the logging, agriculture, and paper industries. This is its present location, eight miles northwest of Colville and roughly 80 miles northwest of Spokane.

== Geography ==
It is 30 miles (48 km) south of the Canada–United States border at Laurier and adjacent to Lake Roosevelt, the reservoir of the Columbia River.

According to the United States Census Bureau, the city has a total area of 1.114 square miles (2.89 km^{2}), all land.

== Demographics ==
Historical population
Census	Pop.	Note	%±
1900	297		—
1910	377		26.9%
1920	276		−26.8%
1930	414		50.0%
1940	560		35.3%
1950	714		27.5%
1960	905		26.8%
1970	893		−1.3%
1980	1,087		21.7%
1990	1,272		17.0%
2000	1,527		20.0%
2010	1,595		4.5%
2020	1,636		2.6%
U.S. Decennial Census; 2020 Census

=== 2020 census ===
As of the 2020 census, Kettle Falls had a population of 1,636. The median age was 41.8 years. 22.6% of residents were under the age of 18 and 19.9% of residents were 65 years of age or older. For every 100 females there were 96.2 males, and for every 100 females age 18 and over there were 94.8 males age 18 and over.

0.0% of residents lived in urban areas, while 100.0% lived in rural areas.

There were 719 households in Kettle Falls, of which 27.1% had children under the age of 18 living in them. Of all households, 38.2% were married-couple households, 23.5% were households with a male householder and no spouse or partner present, and 29.3% were households with a female householder and no spouse or partner present. About 33.9% of all households were made up of individuals and 15.7% had someone living alone who was 65 years of age or older.

There were 770 housing units, of which 6.6% were vacant. The homeowner vacancy rate was 0.0% and the rental vacancy rate was 6.8%.

Racial composition as of the 2020 census
Race	Number	Percent
White	1,402	85.7%
Black or African American	4	0.2%
American Indian and Alaska Native	56	3.4%
Asian	15	0.9%
Native Hawaiian and Other Pacific Islander	1	0.1%
Some other race	41	2.5%
Two or more races	117	7.2%
Hispanic or Latino (of any race)	68	4.2%

=== 2010 census ===
As of the 2010 census, there were 1,595 people, 676 households, and 419 families living in the city. The population density was 1,490.7 inhabitants per square mile (575.6/km^{2}). There were 726 housing units at an average density of 678.5 units per square mile (262.0 units/km^{2}). The racial makeup of the city was 90.9% White, 0.1% African American, 2.0% Native American, 0.4% Asian, 0.1% Pacific Islander, 0.6% from other races, and 5.9% from two or more races. Hispanic or Latino of any race were 1.7% of the population.

There were 676 households, of which 31.2% had children under the age of 18 living with them, 44.7% were married couples living together, 12.3% had a female householder with no husband/wife present, 5.0% had a male householder with no wife/husband present, and 38.0% were non-families. 31.7% of all households were made up of individuals, and 13.8% had someone living alone who was 65 years of age or older. The average household size was 2.35 and the average family size was 2.95.

The median age in the city was 38.6 years. 26.6% of residents were under the age of 18; 7.6% were between the ages of 18 and 24; 23.9% were from 25 to 44; 25.4% were from 45 to 64; and 16.3% were 65 years of age or older. The gender makeup of the city was 47.6% male and 52.4% female.

=== 2000 census ===
As of the 2000 census, there were 1,527 people, 632 households, and 398 families living in the city. The population density was 1,631.1 people per square mile (629.8 people/km^{2}). There were 686 housing units at an average density of 732.8 units per square mile (282.9 units/km^{2}). The racial makeup of the city was 91.29% White, 0.07% African American, 3.86% Native American, 0.20% Asian, 0.07% Pacific Islander, 0.65% from other races, and 3.86% from two or more races. Hispanic or Latino of any race were 2.75% of the population.

There were 632 households, out of which 33.7% had children under the age of 18 living with them, 47.2% were married couples living together, 11.2% had a female householder with no husband present, and 37.0% were non-families. 31.8% of all households were made up of individuals, and 14.4% had someone living alone who was 65 years of age or older. The average household size was 2.42 and the average family size was 3.05.

In the city, the age distribution of the population shows 29.4% under the age of 18, 8.3% from 18 to 24, 25.9% from 25 to 44, 20.5% from 45 to 64, and 15.8% who were 65 years of age or older. The median age was 34 years. For every 100 females, there were 95.8 males. For every 100 females age 18 and over, there were 92.2 males.

The median income for a household in the city was $27,031, and the median income for a family was $34,375. Males had a median income of $33,750 versus $23,750 for females. The per capita income for the city was $13,614. About 15.1% of families and 21.1% of the population were below the poverty line, including 26.0% of those under age 18 and 12.9% of those age 65 or over.

== Notable people ==
- James Darling, NFL player from 1997 to 2006
- Cathy McMorris Rodgers, U.S. representative for Washington's 5th congressional district since 2005
- Carolyn Suzanne Sapp, Miss America 1992 winner and Miss Hawaii 1991 winner

== See also ==
- St. Paul's Mission
- Fort Colvile
- Old Apple Warehouse
