= Northport, Washington =

Northport
- Town
- Northport, Washington
- Location of Northport, Washington
- Coordinates: 48°54′52″N 117°46′56″W
- Country: United States
- State: Washington
- County: Stevens

Government
  - Type: Mayor–council
  - Mayor: Karene Balcom

Area
  - Total: 0.57 sq mi (1.47 km^{2})
  - Land: 0.57 sq mi (1.47 km^{2})
  - Water: 0 sq mi (0.00 km^{2})
- Elevation: 1,335 ft (407 m)

Population (2020)
  - Total: 297
  - Density: 523/sq mi (202/km^{2})
- Time zone: UTC-8 (Pacific (PST))
  - Summer (DST): UTC-7 (PDT)
- ZIP code: 99157
- Area code: 509
- FIPS code: 53-50045
- GNIS feature ID: 2413056
- Website: Town of Northport

Northport is a town in Stevens County, Washington, United States. The population was 297 at the 2020 census.

== History ==
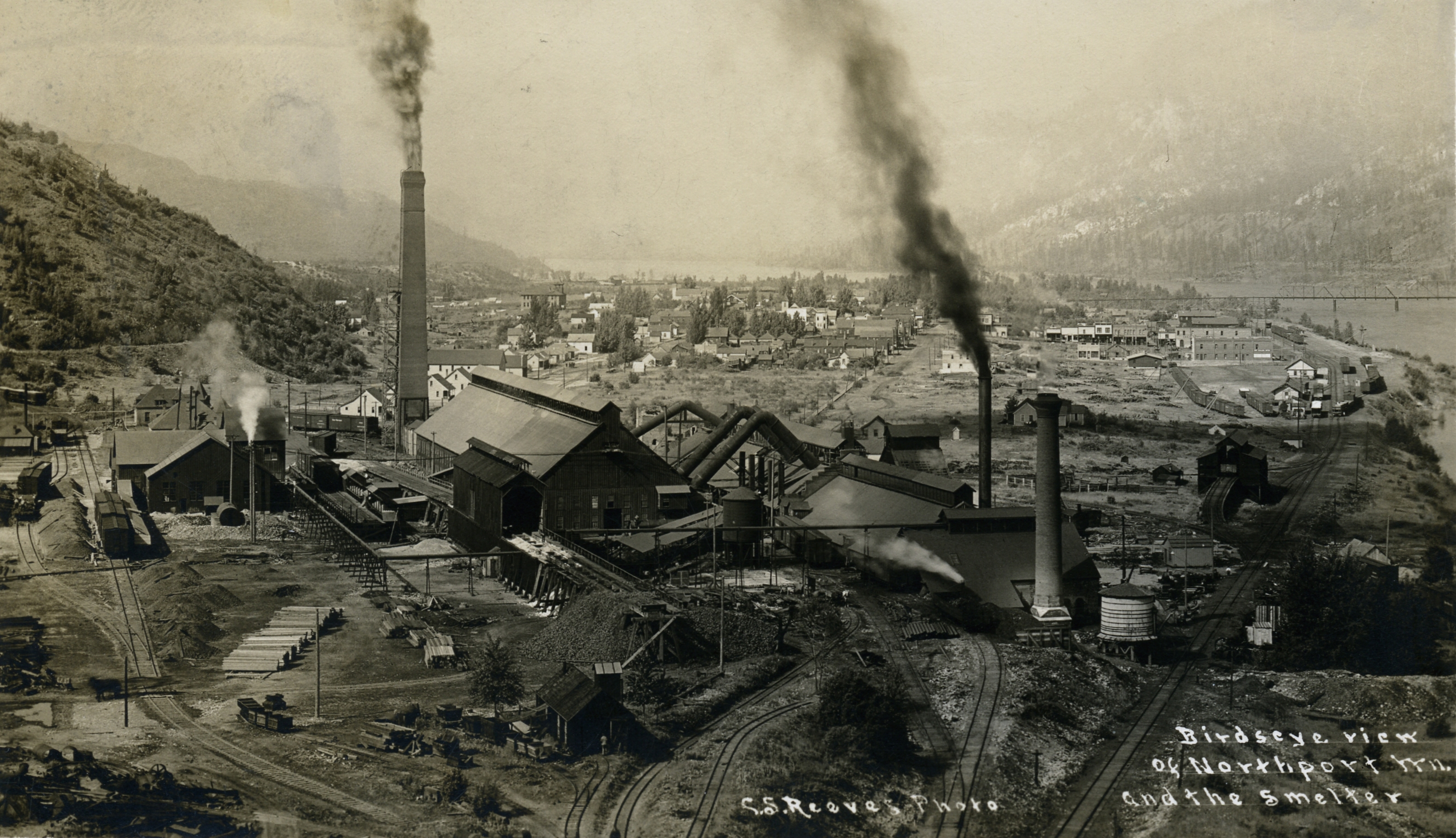
Northport 1916

Northport began when railroad builder Daniel C. Corbin had agents purchase two wooded benches overlooking the Columbia River from the federal government in 1892. Corbin had plans to extend his Spokane Falls and Northern Railway (S&FN) from Little Dalles, the town seven miles south, to the rich mining districts of southern British Columbia. Northport would provide a railhead for two railroads into Canada.

At this time, The Kootenai Steamship Company riverboats provided service from Little Dalles to Revelstoke, B.C. After the S&FN reached Northport on Sept. 18, 1892, the riverboats ran from Northport to Revelstoke.

Northport became an international port of entry in 1895.

In March 1896 a major fire occurred in the business district. At least 16 businesses were destroyed or damaged.

The north half of the Colville Indian Reservation, across the river from Northport, was opened to mining in February 1896. Miners and prospectors flooded into the area and came into town to record their claims, get supplies and entertain themselves.

In 1890, rich gold ore was discovered in Canada at Red Mountain, near the present city of Rossland, British Columbia. Mines were developed and the ore was laboriously shipped out by wagon on a rude road 17 miles (27.4 km) and ferried across the Columbia river to Northport and the S&FN. In January 1896, 174 horse teams hauled ore down the road in one week. The need for rail transportation was great and D.C. Corbin set about obtaining approvals and charters to fill the need. Construction began on the American side in May 1896. A ferry was built at Northport to carry engines and cars across the Columbia River until a bridge could be built. The Columbia and Red Mountain railroad began service in December. The bridge over the Columbia River was begun in early spring 1897 and completed in October. Northport was now a busy railway center boasting a two-story 180-foot (54.9-meter) long passenger depot, the connection point of three railroads linking the supply center of Spokane to the mining districts of British Columbia.

The Red Mountain mines were now producing more ore than the smelter at Trail British Columbia could process. The mine owners, mostly Americans, wanted another smelter. Northport had limestone and rail connections for importing coke, coal and building materials and exporting the smelter matte to distant refineries. D.C. Corbin donated the land on a bench overlooking the river north of town and construction began in August 1897. The smelter began operations in January 1898. Two hundred men were employed which soon increased to almost six hundred.

On May 3, 1898, another major fire reduced to ashes the entire business district and the red light district, more than three city blocks. The city was quickly rebuilt.

On June 23, 1898, an election was held to incorporate an area of the county with 1,500 inhabitants as the "City of Northport", and to elect a mayor and city council. Incorporation passed 228 for, 5 against. Now, instead of the county collecting over $5,000 in local saloon fees, the new town could afford to improve the streets, build sidewalks, have a health officer, a fire department, a marshall and a jail.

The US immigration inspector was located at Northport in 1900.

At this time, the city was financed without property taxes but by licensing saloons, and by fines levied on gambling and courtesans.

In these first years, the smelter mostly treated the copper and gold ores from the LeRoi mine near Rossland, B.C., but in 1906 the LeRoi contracted the Trail, B.C. smelter to treat its ores and the Northport smelter gradually ceased operations, shipping the last matte in May 1911.

After the smelter was idled, things looked bleak for Northport. Times were hard, the population fell to 300, many businesses closed and the Northport State Bank became insolvent, unable to pay its depositors.

On July 22, 1914, Northport suffered another major fire. Blocks 3 and 4 were destroyed. This included most of the business district, a warehouse and the Great Northern train depot. Only a few businesses rebuilt and the once densely packed block 4 has remained mostly vacant ever since.

Then, in September 1915, the Northport Smelting and Refining Co. was purchased by the Hercules Mining Co. and the Tamarack and Custer Consolidated Mining Co. The smelter was renovated to treat lead ores, and began operations March 12, 1916.

At the end of the world war, demand for lead fell and unfavorable freight rates led the Northport smelter to close in 1921. The plant was sold to the American Smelting and Refining Company (ASARCO) in August 1922. ASARCO dismantled the works and the boom days were over.

In 1925, in addition to the general depressed business conditions locally, the smelter at Trail, British Columbia, 20 miles (32.2 km) up the river valley, doubled sulfur emissions. The toxic smoke drifted down the river valley to the United States. Trees died, crops withered and cattle sickened. A meeting of the local farmers led to the formation of a Citizens Protective Association and helped bring the situation to the attention of members of congress. The US State Department opened negotiations with Canada and the matter was referred to The International Joint Commission. It was the first case of air pollution to come before an international tribunal. Negotiations dragged on for years. In 1934 President Roosevelt pressed the case, leading to more studies and a Final Decision was arrived at on Mar 11, 1941 in which $438,000 was paid to compensate the farmers. Individual farmers who had made claims received an amount that was only a small fraction of their losses.

The Tribunal declared that "no state has the right to use or permit the use of its territory in such a manner as to cause injury by fumes in or to the territory of another or the properties or persons therein, when the case is of serious consequence". The Trail Smelter case became "one of the most cited and fundamental cases for international environmental law".

Northport was given its name since it was once the northernmost town on the S&FN.

Due to the incredibly small sizes of Northport and Ione, the Selkirk and Northport school districts have a combined football team called the Selport Lumberjacks.

== Geography ==
According to the United States Census Bureau, the town has a total area of 0.58 square miles (1.50 km^{2}), all of it land.

=== Climate ===
This climatic region is typified by large seasonal temperature differences, with warm to hot (and often humid) summers and cold (sometimes severely cold) winters. According to the Köppen Climate Classification system, Northport has a humid continental climate, abbreviated "Dfb" on climate maps.

The hottest temperature measured in Northport is 113 °F (45 °C) during the 2021 Western North America heat wave in June. The coldest reading is −32 °F (−36 °C) from January 1909. The coldest daily maximum in Northport were two separate −5 °F (−21 °C) measurements, in 1902 and 1968. During the 1991–2020 set of normals, the average coldest maximum was relatively close to the normals at 18 °F (−8 °C). Ice days are common in winter, with normals just below freezing.

Warm nights are very rare. The warmest in recorded history is 73 °F (23 °C) in August 1945. During a normal year, the warmest low is at a mild 62 °F (17 °C).

Climate data for Northport, Washington (1991–2020 normals, extremes 1899–present)
Month	Jan	Feb	Mar	Apr	May	Jun	Jul	Aug	Sep	Oct	Nov	Dec	Year
Record high °F (°C)	57 (14)	60 (16)	76 (24)	92 (33)	102 (39)	113 (45)	111 (44)	109 (43)	105 (41)	87 (31)	69 (21)	58 (14)	113 (45)
Mean maximum °F (°C)	44.4 (6.9)	51.3 (10.7)	65.0 (18.3)	77.5 (25.3)	87.5 (30.8)	91.8 (33.2)	99.1 (37.3)	99.8 (37.7)	90.7 (32.6)	73.5 (23.1)	55.7 (13.2)	44.9 (7.2)	101.4 (38.6)
Mean daily maximum °F (°C)	31.1 (−0.5)	38.7 (3.7)	49.1 (9.5)	59.6 (15.3)	69.6 (20.9)	75.2 (24.0)	85.4 (29.7)	85.7 (29.8)	75.2 (24.0)	56.9 (13.8)	40.5 (4.7)	31.5 (−0.3)	58.2 (14.6)
Daily mean °F (°C)	25.8 (−3.4)	30.3 (−0.9)	38.1 (3.4)	46.1 (7.8)	55.2 (12.9)	60.9 (16.1)	68.0 (20.0)	67.7 (19.8)	58.9 (14.9)	45.4 (7.4)	33.9 (1.1)	26.5 (−3.1)	46.4 (8.0)
Mean daily minimum °F (°C)	20.5 (−6.4)	22.0 (−5.6)	27.2 (−2.7)	32.7 (0.4)	40.8 (4.9)	46.7 (8.2)	50.7 (10.4)	49.7 (9.8)	42.6 (5.9)	33.9 (1.1)	27.3 (−2.6)	21.5 (−5.8)	34.6 (1.4)
Mean minimum °F (°C)	3.6 (−15.8)	11.0 (−11.7)	18.5 (−7.5)	25.2 (−3.8)	31.3 (−0.4)	38.0 (3.3)	43.4 (6.3)	42.7 (5.9)	33.7 (0.9)	22.3 (−5.4)	14.6 (−9.7)	7.1 (−13.8)	−1.9 (−18.8)
Record low °F (°C)	−32 (−36)	−27 (−33)	−11 (−24)	12 (−11)	20 (−7)	26 (−3)	30 (−1)	26 (−3)	17 (−8)	6 (−14)	−11 (−24)	−28 (−33)	−32 (−36)
Average precipitation inches (mm)	2.24 (57)	1.32 (34)	1.64 (42)	1.68 (43)	2.12 (54)	2.44 (62)	1.01 (26)	0.61 (15)	0.97 (25)	1.56 (40)	2.24 (57)	2.47 (63)	20.30 (516)
Average snowfall inches (cm)	15.8 (40)	5.9 (15)	1.7 (4.3)	0.1 (0.25)	0.0 (0.0)	0.0 (0.0)	0.0 (0.0)	0.0 (0.0)	0.0 (0.0)	0.2 (0.51)	5.9 (15)	17.0 (43)	46.6 (118.06)
Average extreme snow depth inches (cm)	12.8 (33)	8.7 (22)	3.5 (8.9)	0.0 (0.0)	0.0 (0.0)	0.0 (0.0)	0.0 (0.0)	0.0 (0.0)	0.0 (0.0)	0.0 (0.0)	3.3 (8.4)	10.5 (27)	14.4 (37)
Average precipitation days (≥ 0.01 in)	12.1	8.7	9.5	9.1	10.2	10.1	5.3	3.5	5.4	9.0	12.0	13.1	108.0
Average snowy days (≥ 0.1 in)	7.0	3.5	1.4	0.1	0.0	0.0	0.0	0.0	0.0	0.1	2.8	8.7	23.6
Source 1: NOAA
Source 2: National Weather Service

== Demographics ==
Historical population
Census	Pop.	Note	%±
1900	787		—
1910	476		−39.5%
1920	906		90.3%
1930	391		−56.8%
1940	427		9.2%
1950	487		14.1%
1960	482		−1.0%
1970	423		−12.2%
1980	368		−13.0%
1990	308		−16.3%
2000	336		9.1%
2010	295		−12.2%
2020	297		0.7%
U.S. Decennial Census; 2015 Estimate

=== 2010 census ===
As of the 2010 census, there were 295 people, 139 households, and 76 families living in the town. The population density was 508.6 inhabitants per square mile (196.4/km^{2}). There were 168 housing units at an average density of 289.7 per square mile (111.9/km^{2}). The racial makeup of the town was 94.2% White, 0.3% African American, 1.7% Native American, 0.7% Asian, 1% from other races, and 2% from two or more races. Hispanic or Latino of any race were 4.1% of the population.

There were 139 households, of which 24.5% had children under the age of 18 living with them, 38.1% were married couples living together, 11.5% had a female householder with no husband present, 5% had a male householder with no wife present, and 45.3% were non-families. 38.1% of all households were made up of individuals, and 14.4% had someone living alone who was 65 years of age or older. The average household size was 2.12 and the average family size was 2.75.

The median age in the town was 48.5 years. 21% of residents were under the age of 18; 6.5% were between the ages of 18 and 24; 18.3% were from 25 to 44; 35.9% were from 45 to 64; and 18.3% were 65 years of age or older. The sexual makeup of the town was 50.2% male and 49.8% female.

=== 2000 census ===
As of the 2000 census, there were 336 people, 151 households, and 83 families living in the town. The population density was 592.7 people per square mile (227.6/km^{2}). There were 179 housing units at an average density of 315.8 per square mile (121.2/km^{2}). The racial makeup of the town was 94.94% White, 0.6% Native American, 0.6% Asian, 0.3% Pacific Islander, 0.3% from other races, and 3.27% from two or more races. Hispanic or Latino of any race were 5.36% of the population.

There were 151 households, out of which 22.5% had children under the age of 18 living with them, 47% were married couples living together, 5.3% had a female householder with no husband present, and 44.4% were non-families. 36.4% of all households were made up of individuals, and 12.6% had someone living alone who was 65 years of age or older. The average household size was 2.23 and the average family size was 3.01.

In the town, the age distribution of the population shows 25% under the age of 18, 5.7% from 18 to 24, 22% from 25 to 44, 30.1% from 45 to 64, and 17.3% who were 65 years of age or older. The median age was 43 years. For every 100 females, there were 100 males. For every 100 females age 18 and over, there were 95.3 males.

The median income for a household in the town was $21,719, and the median income for a family was $26,875. Males had a median income of $28,929 versus $16,000 for females. The per capita income for the town was $11,679. About 15.9% of families and 27.7% of the population were below the poverty line, including 38.5% of those under age 18 and 17.4% of those age 65 or over.

== Janni's chimney ==
Peter Janni was born in Italy in 1874 and came to America to work on the railroad. Eventually he ended up in Northport and in 1923 purchased a limestone quarry south of Northport. Janni shipped limestone all over Washington from the quarry. The quarry was located in the center of the tetrahedrite mineralized zone of Northern Stevens County. Ore deposits in the district occur in "Vugs" or "Chimneys" usually narrow veins of galena with high silver content. In 1953, Janni's crew discovered a chimney of galena with silver, 6 feet by 5 feet (1.8 m by 1.5 m) on the second level of the quarry. They followed it down and shipped nearly forty tons of high grade galena to CM&S Company's lead refinery in nearby Trail. After following it down 15 feet (4.6 meters) Janni came and said: "cover the damn thing up !". Janni's men pleaded to follow the chimney further, but Janni refused, saying: "maybe someday we will dig her up again". Why he abandoned the chimney remains a mystery. According to some old timers in Northport, the rich chimney is still at the quarry buried under tons of limestone, located on the second level.
