= Quincy-Columbia Basin Irrigation District =

Coordinates: 47°05′N 119°40′W

The Quincy-Columbia Basin Irrigation District is a non-profit quasi-municipality located in North Central Washington state that operates and maintains a portion of the Columbia Basin Irrigation Project. The primary function of the Irrigation District is to deliver irrigation water to farm land located in the Columbia River Basin.

== Overview ==
The Quincy-Columbia Basin Irrigation District (QCBID) is one of three independent non-profit quasi-municipalities founded under Washington state law that hold a contract with the United States Bureau of Reclamation, a division of the United States Department of Interior, to operate and maintain a portion of the Columbia Basin Project.

The Quincy-Columbia Basin Irrigation District is also a member of the Grand Coulee Hydropower Authority. Under agreement with GCHPA and Grant County Public Utility District No. 2, the Quincy Irrigation District contributes in excess of 9400 kilowatts of hydroelectric power produced at the Quincy Chute, located near the 40-mile (64 km) mark on the West Canal, to the local power grid.

== Geography ==
The service area for the Irrigation District is bounded roughly to the north by Lake Lenore, to the south by the Saddle Mountains, to the east by Moses Lake, and to the west by the Columbia River. The other two Irrigation Districts, the East-Columbia Basin Irrigation District (ECBID) and the South-Columbia Basin Irrigation District (SCBID) cover the remainder of the Columbia Basin Project.

Cities within the District Boundaries include Soap Lake, Ephrata, Quincy, George, Royal City, and portions of Moses Lake, Washington. Service areas include most of Grant County and a small portion of Adams County.

== Delivery System ==
The water source servicing the irrigated lands within the district starts at Grand Coulee Dam, located in North Central Washington. The water is pumped up into the Banks Lake Reservoir. At the outlet of Banks Lake Reservoir is Dry Falls Dam, which regulates the amount of water entering into the irrigation project's Main Canal, which runs south from Dry Falls Dam to another reservoir called Billy Clapp Lake, formed by Pinto Dam. The Main Canal continues to a point North and East of Soap Lake, Washington, to the Main Canal Bifurcation. At this point, the Main Canal splits into the East Low Canal and the West Canal. The East Low Canal serves the East and South Columbia Basin Irrigation Districts, while the West Canal exclusively services the Quincy-Columbia Basin Irrigation District.

== Crops Served ==
Crops currently grown within the Irrigation District vary widely; one estimate claims over 60 different crops are grown annually. Over $2 billion worth of crops are grown annually within the Columbia Basin Project:alfalfa, wheat, soybeans, mint, potatoes, sweet corn, grain corn, livestock, apples, cherries, peaches, apricots, oats, barley, wine grapes, beans, sugar beets, carrots, squash, watermelon, and various other crops are commonly grown within the Irrigation District.

== Statistics ==
Irrigable land - 247,452 acres (1,001.4 km^{2})

District area - Over 500,000 acres (2.0×10^{9} m^{2})

Initial capacity of West Canal - 5,100 cu ft/s (140 m^{3}/s)

West canal length - 88 miles (142 km)

Sub laterals length - 893 miles (1,437 km)

Drains/wasteways length - 1,563 miles (2,515 km)

Parcels of land served - 4,166

Number of employees - 113

Irrigable area per employee - 2,189 acres (8.9 km^{2})
