= Laser light show (Grand Coulee Dam) =

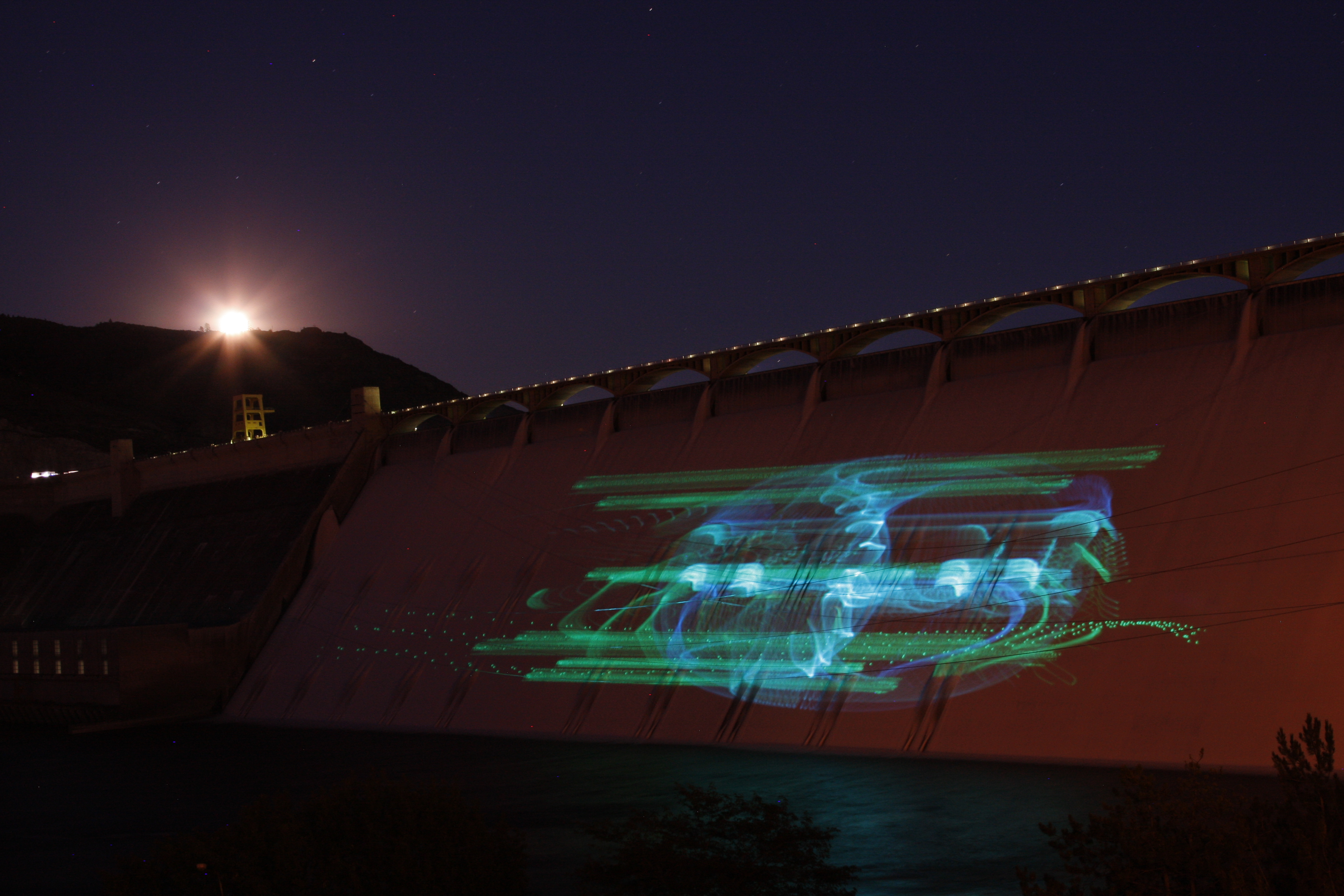
Long-exposure night photo of the Grand Coulee Dam laser show with a full moon rising, taken from the Visitor Center parking lot in August 2012

The laser light show at Grand Coulee Dam, which began in 1989, is one of the largest light shows in the U.S. The 37 minute show runs daily from Memorial Day through September 30. An addition of fireworks lights up the sky above the dam on the Sunday of each Memorial Day weekend, and July 4.

The Grand Coulee Dam premiered its first non-laser light show in 1957. Approximately 740 flood lamps near the base of the dam lit up the dam, but not enough water flooded down the spillway for the desired effect.

== Lasers and sound ==
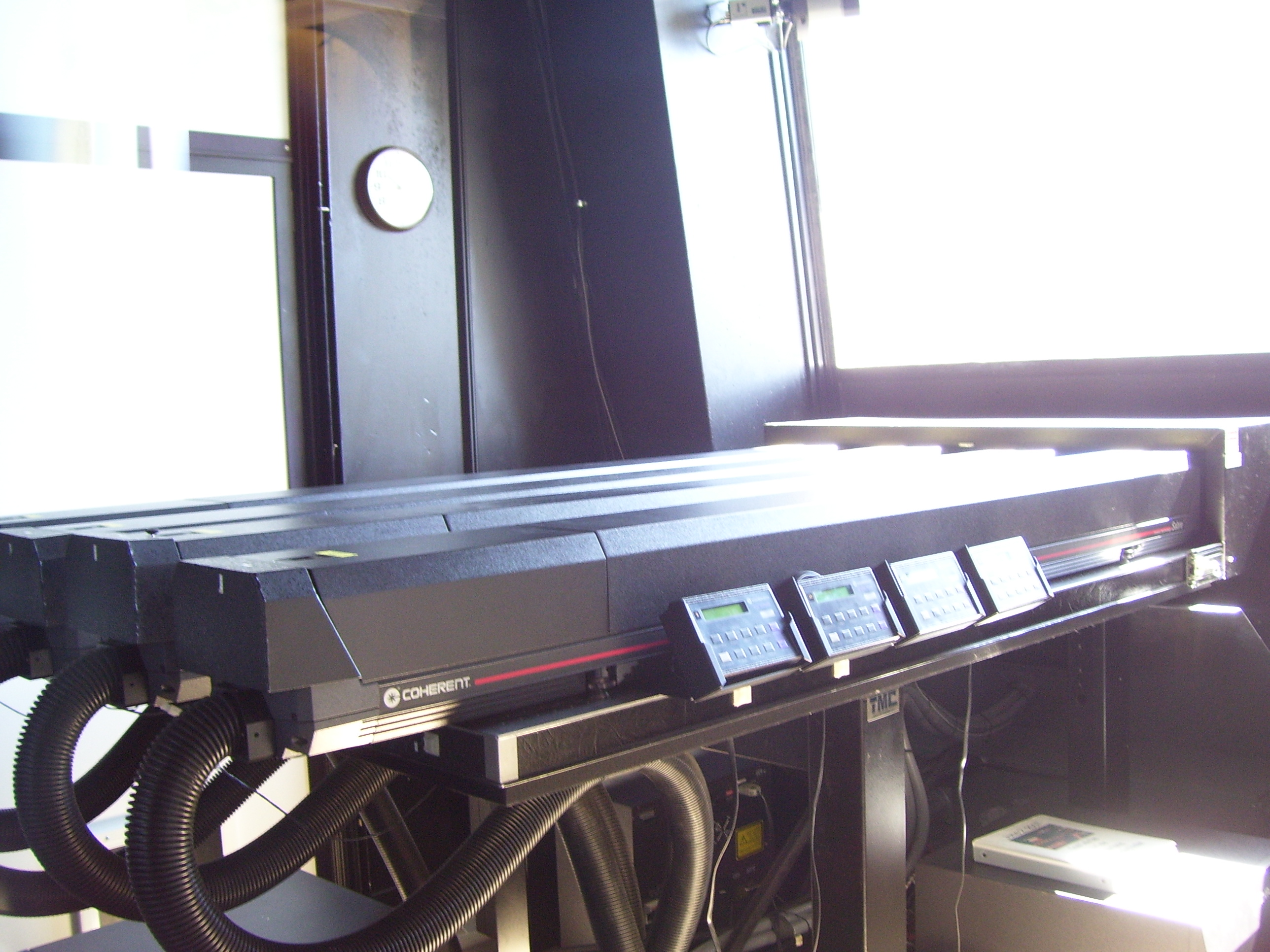
Four lasers are used to produce the image.

Lasers for the show are projected from the nearby Visitors' Arrival Center and consist of four large frame Coherent Sabre Lasers, (two 12-watt Krypton (red) and two 30-watt argon lasers (green and blue). They are split and combined with dichroic filters and controlled with analog modulators to create full color vector images. These images are projected 1100–4000 feet onto the face of the dam as well as the third power-house which is to the far left. The entire dam is utilized as a screen during the show.

The show includes Glenn Mazen voicing the character of the Columbia River which narrates the history of Columbia Basin Project, the construction of the dam, and the Indians living along its banks.

The laser system contractor was Laser Fantasy International based in Bellevue, Washington. The optical system was designed by Floyd Rollefstad; the original digital recording and playback system was designed and fabricated by Fred Lord, and was installed by Dan Lawrence, Casey Stack, Dave Haskell, Matt Monforte and Kirk Melby in 1989. The original show treatment and script research, as well as the exhibit design team was led by Jeff Silverman, who also acted as the account executive to manage process from proposal to grand opening. The programming team was led by Robert Mueller, who managed a team of six full time artists, including Cory Simpson of KOHR Productions, over a 15-week period to create this challenging production and award-winning program.

Laser Fantasy's custom vector laser graphic programming and playback system 'Production Studio' was used for show development and much of the show programming. In addition to the main show programming, the interactive portion of the tour guide operated pre-show ran from this software package in real time. The revolutionary Production Studio package was developed and coded by Jim Arledge.

In 2007, the show playback system was redesigned by Ted Smith of Lasersmith Light Show Systems, LLC in Yakima, Washington using state-of-the-art digital circuitry, allowing for future show updates as well as ease of alignment. The show's soundtrack was also cleaned up digitally. In 2009, the four-laser projection system was disassembled and upgraded by Lasersmith, to allow the system to produce higher-quality images with more color.

In 2012 the system was returned to the care of its creators, Laser Fantasy.

In summer 2013, the "Water and Life" (which has been running for the past 24 seasons) show was suspended for technical updates, to be replaced with an all-new laser light show, "One River, Many Voices", to be ready in 2014. The new show was being prepared by LumaLaser of Eugene, Oregon.

2020 saw the show go on hiatus as a preventative measure in response to the COVID-19 pandemic, but it returned in 2021.
