= Columbia Basin Initiative =

2023 agreement for salmon restoration and clean energy production

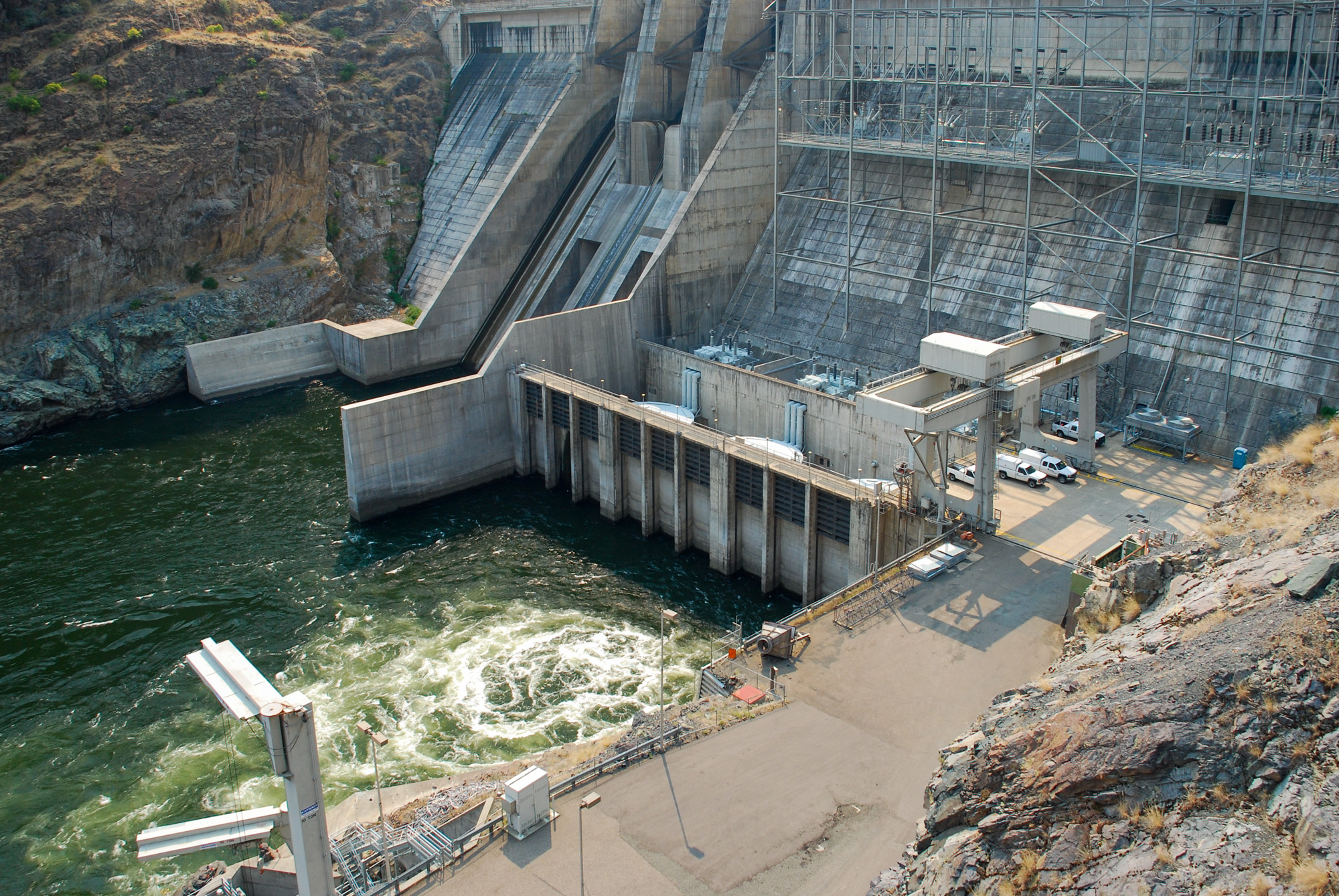
Hells Canyon Dam, Snake River

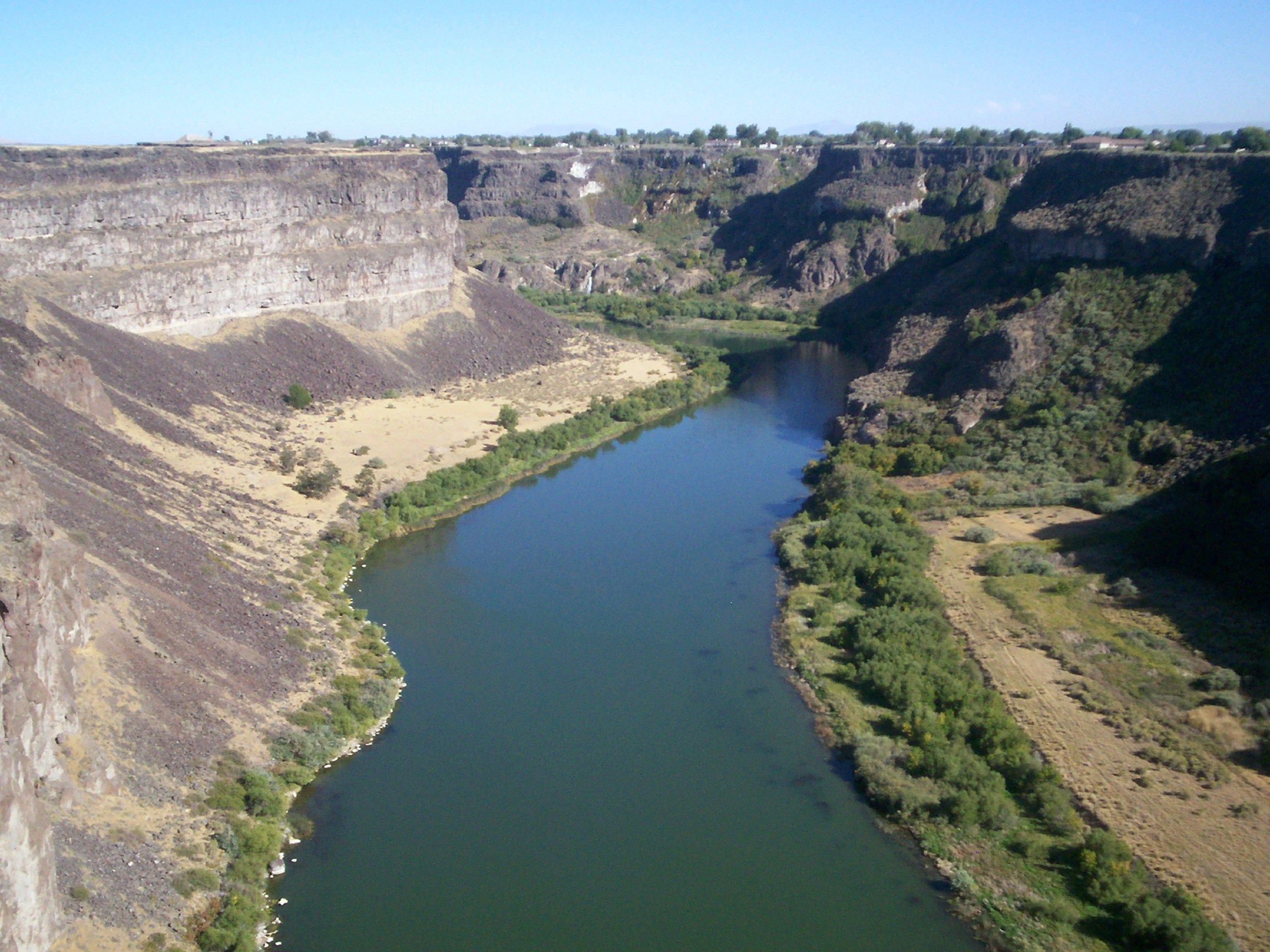
Snake River near Twin Falls, Idaho

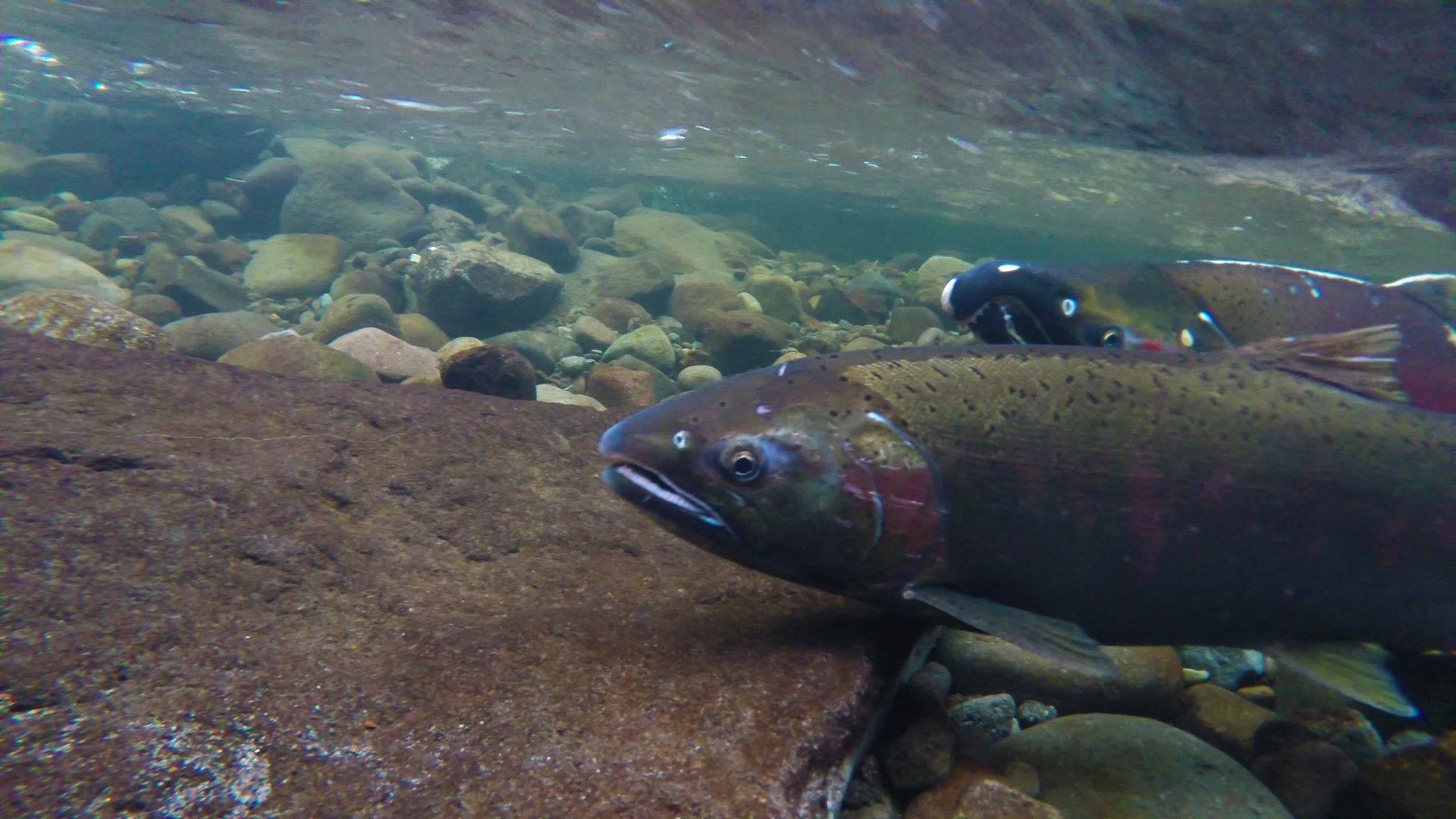
Coho Spawning on the Salmon River

The Columbia Basin Initiative is a 2023 agreement between the U.S. government, four sovereign Native American Tribes (Nez Perce, Yakama, Warm Springs and Umatilla) and the U.S. states of Washington and Oregon to provide over $1 billion in funds for salmon restoration and clean energy production. The agreement comes after over twenty years of litigation with the U.S. government for violating the Endangered Species Act. The agreement honors the treaty rights of the four tribes to fish and gather food in the Columbia Basin. The funding also will be used to support Tribally-owned energy projects.

== History ==
The Columbia Basin refers to the geographic area that spans Washington, Oregon, and Idaho.

In the 1960s, the U.S. government built four dams on the Snake River. These dams provide hydroelectric power to the region. Scientists, tribes, and fisherman believe that the dams have led to the destruction of the salmon population.

In 2022, Washington Governor Jay Inslee and U.S. Senator Patty Murray published a report about the cost of replacing the energy and irrigation of the Lower Snake Sams.

=== Salmon restoration ===
Salmon are a critical food source for animals in the region. Salmon are also important to the culture, economy, and way of life of tribal nations and indigenous people in the area.

Scientists argue that there is a threat of extinction for thirteen species of salmon and steelhead trout. Climate change is also impacting the salmon population through warming waters.

The Columbia Basin Initiative makes changes to dam schedules during salmon runs and migration in an effort to preserve the salmon population.

=== Tribal sovereignty ===
The 1855 Treaty of Point Elliott created the Yakama Nation, which included 1.3 million acres of land. While the federal government retained 11 million acres of land, there was a provision that tribal members could continue to fish and gather food in that area.

== Litigation and the Endangered Species Act ==
In 1992, the US National Oceanic and Atmospheric Administration (NOAA) released a report stating that the dams on the Lower Snake River would not endanger the fish population. The Idaho Department of Fish and Game sued the U.S. District Court, challenge the report. The court ruled that the NOAA report was "arbitrary and capricious."

A 2021 lawsuit includes U.S. Army Corps of Engineers, Bureau of Reclamation, Bonneville Power Administration, United States Fish and Wildlife Service, and the National Marine Fisheries Service. Earthjustice represented the plaintiffs. The plaintiffs agreed to put the lawsuit on pause while the parties created a plan to save the salmon.

Proponents believe that the pause in litigation charts a path for breaching the four lower Snake River Dams. Opponents including Rep. Cathy McMorris Rodgers of Washington State and Jim Matheson, CEO of the National Rural Electric Cooperative Association argue that the dams provide affordable and reliable sources of power for the region.

One of the goals is to replace the hydropower with another form of clean energy, and ultimately to breech the four Lower Snake River Dams.

== Timeline ==
1938: the US Congress passes the Bonneville Project Act which allows the sale of power from federal dams on the Columbia River.

1938: Congress passes the Mitchell Act which establishes salmon hatcheries to replace the salmon population lost from the dams.

1945: River and Harbors Act approves building four dams on the lower Snake River. Bonneville Power Administration is in charge of marketing the power.

1973: Endangered Species Act is passed.

1980: Congress passes the Northwest Power Act to acknowledge the declining salmon population.

1992: The Idaho Department of Fish and Game sued to National Marine Fisheries Service for its biological opinion on the impact of the Lower Snake Dams on the salmon population.
