= Franklin D. Roosevelt Lake =

Reservoir in Washington, United States

- Lake Roosevelt
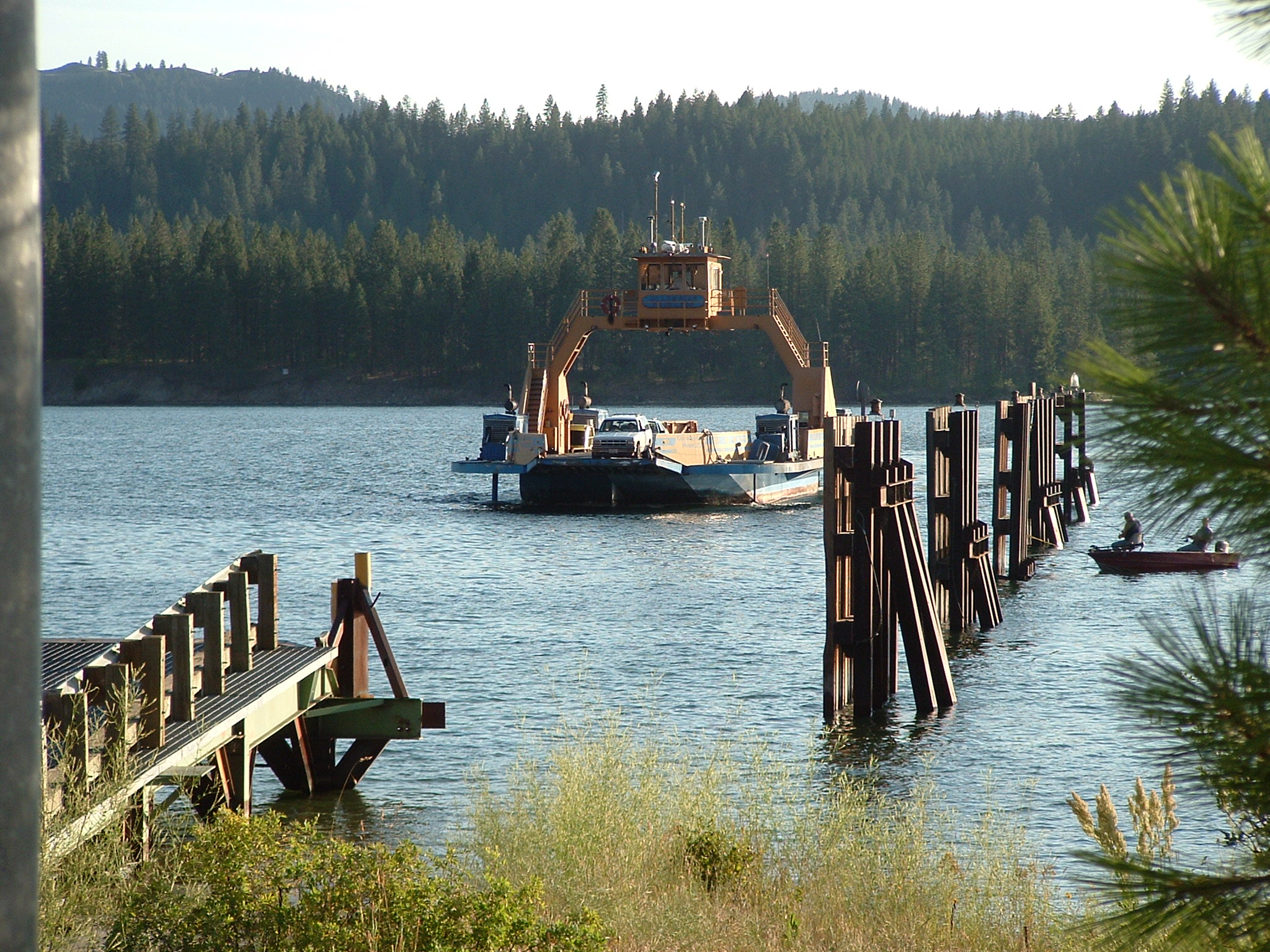
- Gifford Ferry crossing Lake Roosevelt near Inchelium

- Location within Washington (state) Location within the United States
- Location: Washington, US
- Coordinates: 48°08′17.31″N 118°13′09.02″W at Grand Coulee Dam
- Lake type: reservoir
- Primary inflows: Columbia River; Spokane River; San Poil River
- Primary outflows: Columbia River
- Basin countries: United States
- Surface area: 125 sq mi (320 km^{2})
- Surface elevation: 1,290 ft (390 m)

Franklin D. Roosevelt Lake (also called Lake Roosevelt) is the reservoir created in 1941 by the impoundment of the Columbia River by the Grand Coulee Dam in Washington state. It is named for Franklin D. Roosevelt, who was president during the construction of the dam. Covering 125 square miles (80,000 acres), it stretches about 150 miles (240 km) from the Canada–US border to Grand Coulee Dam, with over 600 miles (970 km) of shoreline; by surface area it is the largest lake and reservoir in Washington. It is the home of the Lake Roosevelt National Recreation Area.

The reservoir lies in parts of five counties in northeastern Washington; roughly in descending order of lake acreage they are Ferry, Stevens, Lincoln, Okanogan, and Grant counties.

== Etymology ==
Originally, the Bureau of Reclamation referred to the impoundment formed behind Grand Coulee Dam as the Columbia Reservoir. It was unofficially referred to as "Columbia Lake" and "Empire Lake" by local newspapers, including the Colville Examiner in Stevens County; the latter name was chosen in a 1941 contest organized by the Spokane Daily Chronicle and forwarded to the Department of the Interior as a suggestion. "Empire Lake" was suggested by 113 entries and was among the most popular of the suggestions, which also included "Grand Coulee" (later used for a separate reservoir), "Sunset", "Spokane", and "Roosevelt"; entries with the name "Columbia" were not considered due to its previous rejection by federal officials as an official name.

On April 17, 1945, five days after the death of President Roosevelt, Secretary of the Interior Harold L. Ickes renamed the reservoir Franklin D. Roosevelt Lake. Secretary Ickes stated this token honor recognized how President Roosevelt championed the dam and advocated the legislation to create it. The accompanying Coulee Dam National Recreation Area was renamed for Roosevelt in 1996 to match the lake.

== Administration ==
The lake and lands are managed under the Lake Roosevelt Cooperative Management Agreement dated April 5, 1990, succeeding an original 1946 agreement. Per the agreement, the management and regulations of Lake Roosevelt Management Area set out in the agreement are not intended to nor shall they interfere with or be inconsistent with the purposes for which the Columbia Basin Project was established, is operated and maintained; those purposes being primarily flood control, improved navigation, streamflow regulation, providing for storage and for the delivery of stored waters thereof for the reclamation of public and private lands and Indian reservations, for the generation of electrical power and for other beneficial uses, nor it is in intended to modify or alter any obligations or authority of the parties.

The National Park Service manages Lake Roosevelt National Recreation Area. The NPS maintains visitor centers, boat-in campsites, shoreline camping, and conducts marine patrols for compliance with United States Coast Guard marine safety rules.

The Bureau of Reclamation has two management zones. One is directly behind the dam. It follows the log boom line from the west bank of the river to about mid-channel. Then at the Grant and Okanogan county line (in the middle of the lake) the boundary goes uplake for a short distance until it cuts across to the east shoreline. The other zone is located on the east side of the lake at China Bar, 48°49′23″N 117°55′57″W. Reclamation operates a log collection facility. Reclamation captures logs and other large debris before it enters Lake Roosevelt.

Bureau of Indian Affairs indirectly manages parts of the lake that are along the Colville Indian Reservation and Spokane Reservation.

Although some Washington Department of Natural Resources lands abut against Lake Roosevelt National Recreation Area, the state's Discover Pass does not cover use of NPS boat launches or tribal lands and waters.

== Pollution litigation ==
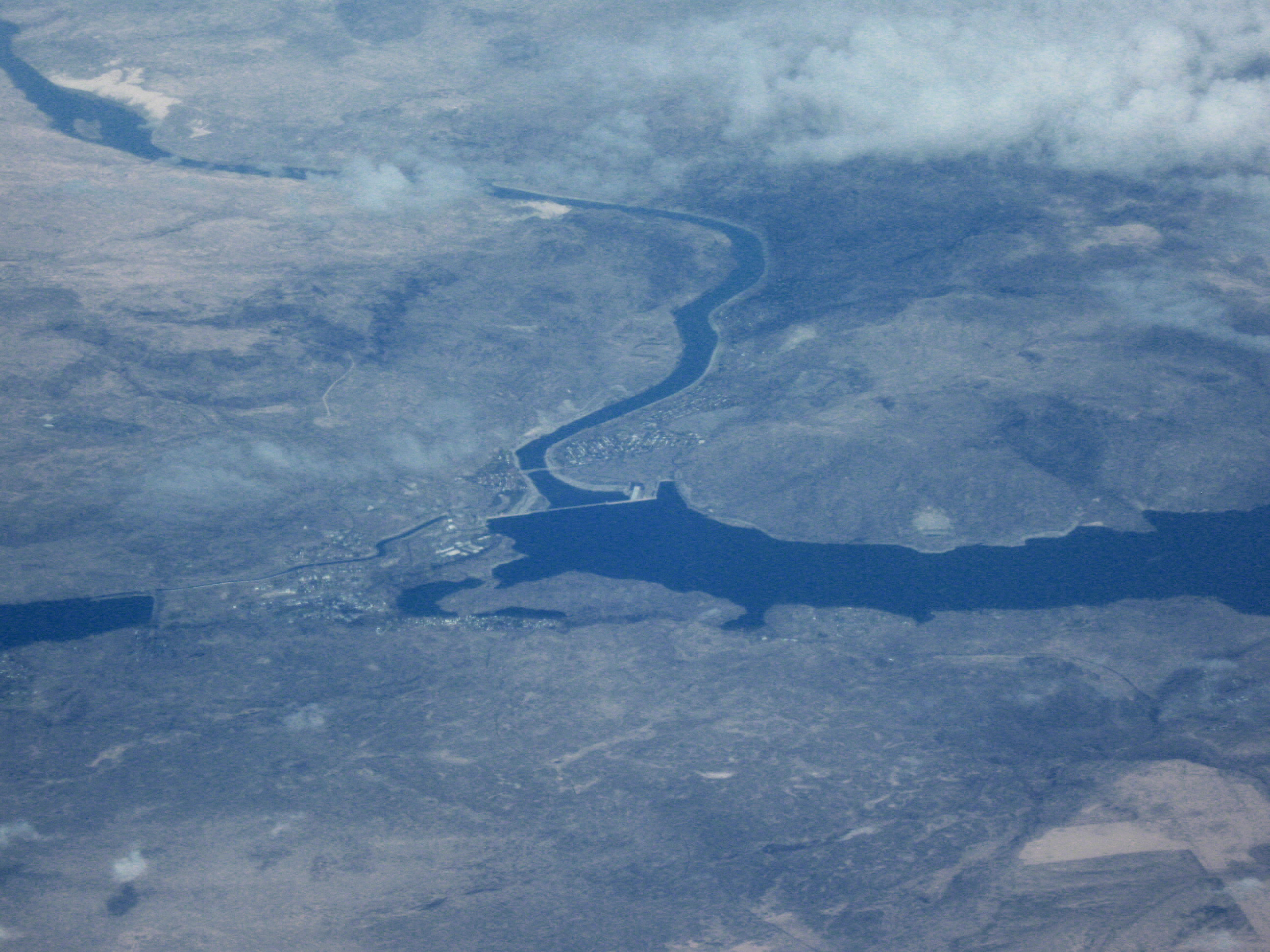
Franklin Delano Roosevelt Lake looking downstream toward Grand Coulee Dam

The lake is downstream from the Canadian province of British Columbia's Trail Smelter, and has been the subject of litigation over environmental concerns.

Cominco's smelter deposited slag from its plant into the Columbia River, which then flowed into Lake Roosevelt. Environmental concerns were raised when these deposits were found to include mercury, lead and zinc. This discovery led the nearby indigenous group, the Colville Confederated Tribes, to take action against Cominco and hold them responsible for degrading the water quality of the lake. The pollution raised health concerns for tribe members, who used the beaches and campsites along the river and ate fish from the river "for subsistence, cultural and spiritual reasons". The lawsuit, launched in 2004, was unique in that it demanded Cominco comply with a U.S. Environmental Protection Agency (EPA) order to provide funding for pollution studies of the Trail operation. In a media statement released in 2003, Cominco agreed to invest $13-million for studies of the health and ecology of Lake Roosevelt, as well as fund the cleanup required to rid the lake of metal contamination associated with the company's smelting practices; although the company's agreement to fund the studies was well-intentioned, the Colville Confederated Tribes countered that Cominco's offer was inadequate because it "did not meet the quality of studies and cleanup guarantees that would be required under EPA rules".

The lawsuit between Cominco and the Colville Confederated Tribes sparked more tensions between Canada and the U.S. over transborder environmental laws. As a Canadian company, Cominco felt that their operation was being unfairly targeted because the lawsuit was ordering them to follow an American governing body's orders to clean up Lake Roosevelt. Cominco also objected to the implication in the lawsuit that it was the only company responsible for the pollution of Lake Roosevelt.

In 1994, Cominco stopped depositing smelting byproducts into the Columbia River and in 2004 reportedly spent about $1 billion modernizing the Trail plant and reducing its emissions.

== See also ==
- List of lakes in Washington
- Banks Lake (nearby reservoir)
- Grand Coulee (ancient riverbed)
- Columbia Basin Project
- Columbia River
- Grand Coulee Dam
