= North Dam =

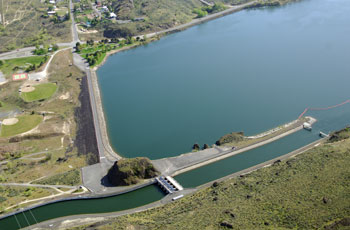

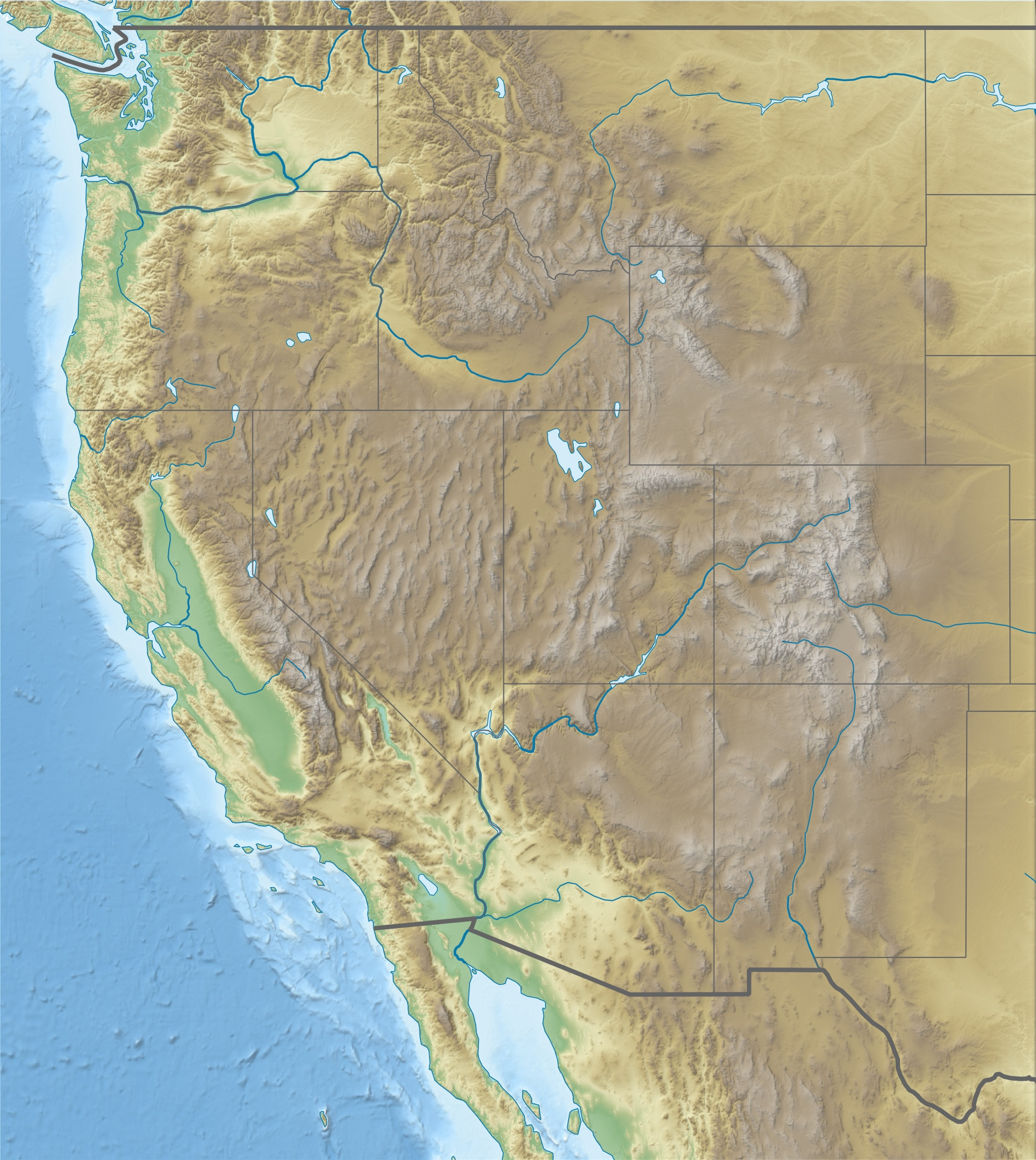
- Location of North Dam in the western U.S.
- Country: United States
- Location: Grant County, Washington
- Coordinates: 47°56′27.03″N 119°1′2.66″W
- Construction began: 1946
- Opening date: 1951
- Operator: United States Bureau of Reclamation

Dam and spillways
- Type of dam: Embankment, earth-fill
- Impounds: Grand Coulee
- Height: 145 ft (44 m)
- Length: 1,450 ft (442 m)
- Elevation at crest: 1,580 ft (480 m)

Reservoir
- Creates: Banks Lake
- Total capacity: 1,275,000 acre⋅ft (1.573 km^{3})
- Active capacity: 715,000 acre⋅ft (0.882 km^{3})
- Catchment area: 278.3 sq mi (721 km^{2})
- Surface area: 27,000 acres (109 km^{2})
- Normal elevation: 1,570 ft (480 m)

North Dam is an earth-fill embankment dam near the town of Grand Coulee in Grant County, Washington, United States. Construction of the dam began in 1946 and it was completed in 1951. Along with Dry Falls Dam about 22 mi (35 km) to the southwest, North Dam creates the reservoir Banks Lake within the ancient Grand Coulee riverbed. The lake serves as the equalizer reservoir of the Columbia Basin Project. Near the North Dam's left abutment is the entrance to the feeder canal of the project. The canal serves to either deliver water to the pump-generating plant at Grand Coulee Dam or return water to Banks Lake from the same pumped-storage plant.

The North Dam, near the town of Grand Coulee, has a maximum height of 145 feet (44 m) and a crest length of 1,400 feet (430 m). Crest elevation of both dams is 1,580 feet (480 m), and the maximum water level in Banks Lake is elevation 1,570 feet (480 m). Both North and Dry Falls dams have 10 feet (3.0 m) of freeboard for protection against wave action due to high winds.
