= Dry Falls Dam =

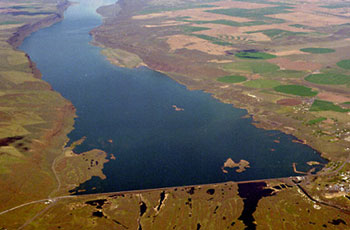
- Location: Grant County, Washington, USA
- Coordinates: 47°37′12″N 119°18′27″W
- Opening date: 1949
- Operator(s): United States Bureau of Reclamation

Dam and spillways
- Impounds: Grand Coulee
- Height: 123 feet (37 m)
- Length: 9,800 feet (2,990 m)
- Width (base): 480 feet (150 m)

Reservoir
- Creates: Banks Lake
- Total capacity: 1,275,000 acre-feet (1.573 km^{3})
- Catchment area: 278.3 square miles (721 km^{2})
- Surface area: 27,000 acres (109 km^{2})

Dry Falls Dam is a rockfaced earthfill type dam in the U.S. state of Washington. Located in Grant County near Coulee City, it was built as part of the Bureau of Reclamation's Columbia Basin Project. Water from the Columbia River, impounded by Grand Coulee Dam, is pumped into Grand Coulee, a formerly dry canyon, through the short Feeder Canal. Grand Coulee's north end is sealed by North Dam and Dry Falls Dam stretches across the midsection of the Coulee. This allows the water pumped from the Columbia River to fill the upper Grand Coulee, creating a large equalizing reservoir known as Banks Lake. Water from the reservoir is fed into the irrigation project's Main Canal, which runs south from Dry Falls Dam to another reservoir called Billy Clapp Lake, formed by Pinto Dam.

== Works ==
Both North and Dry Falls Dams are rock-faced, earthfill dams. They were built to create Banks Lake, 27 miles (43 km) long as an equalizing reservoir, with storage capacity of 715,000 acre-feet for irrigation. The reverse flow, back to the Columbia River, provides additional electrical power. The feeder canal from Banks Lake has a capacity of 26,000 cubic feet per second, Dry Falls Dam and the Main Canal headworks are near Coulee City. While not a part of the Dry Falls Dam, the Main Canal Headworks was expanded to add a six pump/generating units. The Main Canal was widened from 50 to 80 feet (15 to 24 m).

== History ==
Originally known as the South Coulee Dam, Dry Falls Dam began construction in 1946. Roy L. Blair and Company and James Crick and Sons, were awarded the contract for $2,771,887 to build the dam. Work began in mid-July. Included in the contract was the dam across the Grand Coulee, the approach channel, the headworks and control structure, and the initial reach to the main canal. A cutoff trench was created down to bedrock along the length of the dam. A continuous concrete wall was centered in the trench with footings at least 3 feet (0.91 m) deep. The wall prevents seepage of water under the dam, and is from 5 to 10 feet (1.5 to 3.0 m) high. The construction of the canal head works began in March 1948, and was completed a year later. Designed as a zoned earth embankment structure with an impervious central core, a semi-pervious layer on either side of the core, and a layer of rock fill. The semi-pervious layer was built in 1 foot (0.30 m) layers and compacted. The rock fill laid up in 3 feet (0.91 m) layers without compaction.
