= Columbia River drainage basin =

Drainage basin of the Columbia River in western North America

Coordinates: 46°N 116°W

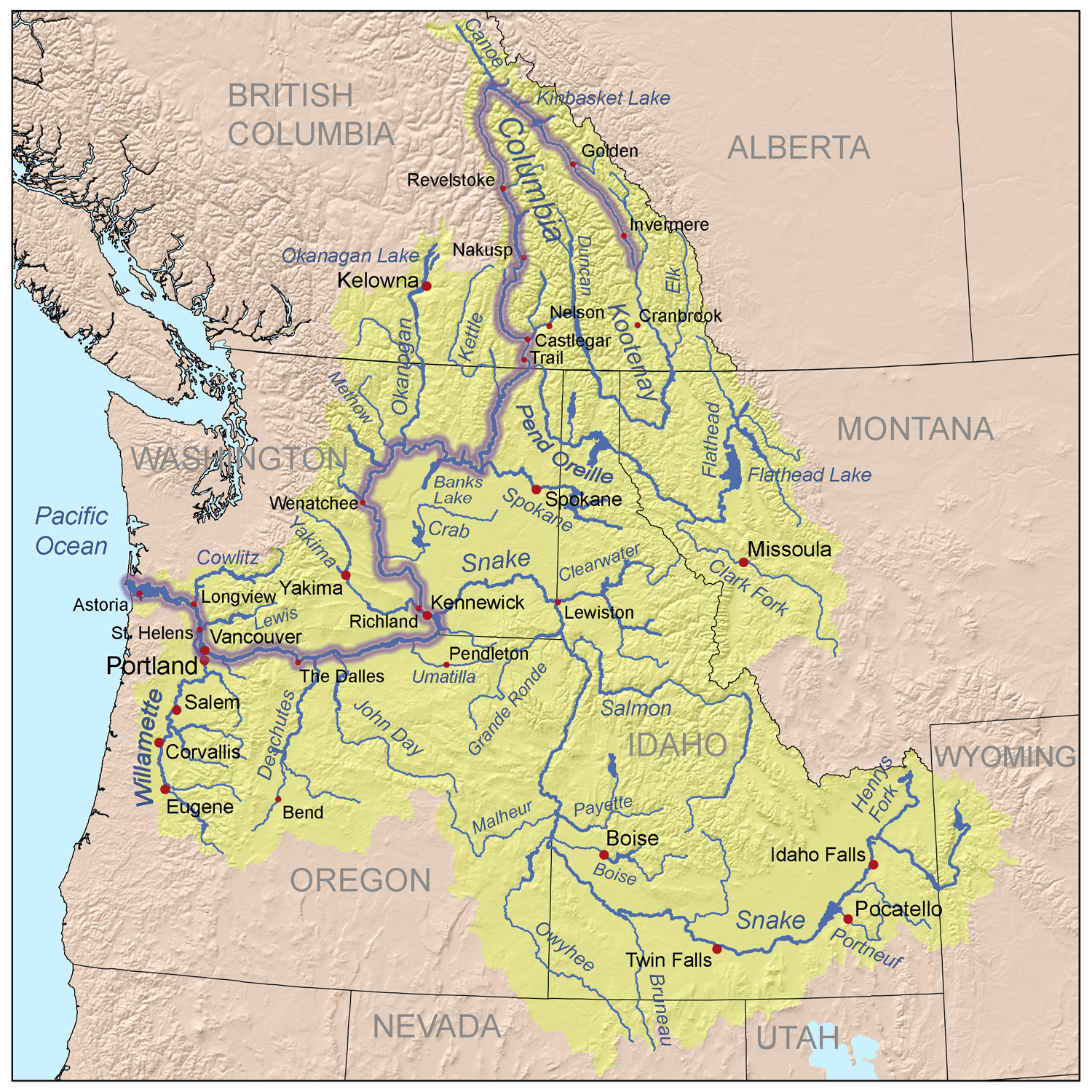
The Columbia Basin

The Columbia River drainage basin is the drainage basin of the Columbia River in the Pacific Northwest region of North America. It covers 668,000 km^{2} or 258,000 sq mi. In common usage, the term often refers to a smaller area, generally the portion of the drainage basin that lies within eastern Washington.

Usage of the term "Columbia Basin" in British Columbia generally refers only to the immediate basins of the Columbia and Kootenay Rivers and excludes that of the Okanagan, Kettle and Similkameen Rivers.

== Description ==
The Columbia Basin includes the southeastern portion of the Canadian province of British Columbia, most of the U.S. states of Idaho, Oregon, and Washington, the western part of Montana, and very small portions of Nevada, Utah, and Wyoming. The south and southeastern drainage divide borders the interior drainage of the northern Great Basin. To the northeast the region borders the basins of the Saskatchewan River (Hudson Bay) and the Mackenzie River (Beaufort Sea), and to the northwest the basin of the Fraser River. The Columbia Basin extends from the Rocky Mountains in the east through the Cascade Range to the Columbia River's outflow at the Pacific Ocean in the west.

The Columbia River pours more water into the Pacific Ocean than any other river in North or South America. In its 1,270 miles (2,040 km) course to the Pacific Ocean, the Columbia flows through four mountain ranges—the Rockies, Selkirks, Cascades, and coastal mountains—and drains 258,000 square miles (668,000 km^{2}). The mainstem of the Columbia rises in Columbia Lake on the west slope of the Rocky Mountain Range in Canada. Its largest tributary, the Snake, travels 1,038 miles (1,670 km) from its source in Yellowstone National Park in Wyoming before joining the Columbia.

=== Washington region ===
Residents of the area surrounding the confluence of the Columbia and Snake rivers—a region centering on the Tri-Cities, Washington metropolitan area—use the term "Columbia Basin" to refer to their own, much smaller region. This usage is roughly synonymous with the Columbia Plateau or roughly equivalent to the relatively unforested area bounded by the Cascades, Blue, Wallowa, and Rocky mountain ranges and the Okanagan Highland. This sense of the term Columbia Basin has expanded from its early focus on the land irrigated by Grand Coulee Dam and the Columbia Basin Project to include other irrigation districts such as the Yakima and Walla Walla valleys. The area includes valuable farmland that has excellent soil profile and underlying silty loess. At its center is the Pasco Basin, an area roughly double the size of, and fully containing, the Hanford Site.

=== Oregon region ===
Many major rivers that flow through Oregon are tributaries of the Columbia River, including the Umatilla River and John Day River in northeastern Oregon. The largest tributaries from the south are the Deschutes River in Central Oregon, which provides much of the drainage on the eastern side of the Cascade Range, and the Willamette River, which flows between the Oregon Coast Range and the Cascade Range. The Willamette accounts for 12 to 15 percent of the Columbia's flow, and the basin that contains two-thirds of Oregon's population, including the state capital, Salem, Oregon, and the state's largest city, Portland, Oregon which surrounds the Willamette's mouth at the Columbia.

== History ==
When Lewis and Clark explored the region in the early 19th century, huge numbers of fish (salmon) returned to spawn every year. "The multitudes of this fish are almost inconceivable," Clark wrote in the autumn of 1805. At that time, the Columbia and its tributaries provided 12,935 miles (20,817 km) of pristine river habitat. In the early 20th century, the government and private interests began constructing dams on the tributaries of the Columbia River to provide water for irrigation or flood control. The federal dams on the Columbia and Snake Rivers devastated salmon runs, inundated Columbia River Basin Tribes villages and burial grounds, and deprived tribal members of the ability to exercise traditional ways of life.

== See also ==
- Inland Northwest
