= Pinto Dam =

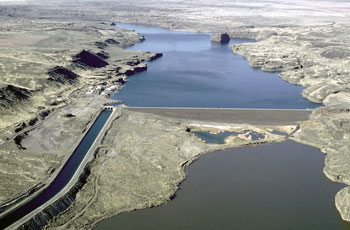
- Interactive map of Pinto Dam
- Country: United States
- Location: Grant County, Washington, USA
- Coordinates: 47°26′50″N 119°15′00″W
- Opening date: 1948
- Operator: United States Bureau of Reclamation

Dam and spillways
- Height: 130 ft (40 m)
- Length: 1,900 feet (579 m)
- Width (base): 600 ft (180 m)

Reservoir
- Creates: Billy Clapp Lake
- Total capacity: 21,200 acre⋅ft (0.0261 km^{3})
- Catchment area: 190 sq mi (490 km^{2})
- Surface area: 973.6 acres (3.940 km^{2})
- Normal elevation: 1,339 ft (408 m)

Pinto Dam is a dam in Grant County, Washington.

The dam was a project of the United States Bureau of Reclamation, completed from 1946 through 1948 as one element of the vast Columbia Basin Project for irrigation water storage, flood control, and hydroelectric power generation. Pinto Dam is an earthen structure, 130 feet high and 1900 feet long at its crest, that provides offstream storage of water.

The six-mile-long crescent-shaped reservoir it creates, Billy Clapp Lake, was originally called Long Lake Reservoir, but was renamed for one of the sponsors of the project, a lawyer from Ephrata, Washington. The lake offers year-round fishing for yellow perch, crappie, rainbow trout, and walleye. The Stratford Wildlife Recreation Area borders Billy Clapp Lake on its eastern shore and hosts migrating waterfowl. Another sizable lake, Brook Lake, also stands below the dam.

== Columbia Basin Project ==
Pinto Dam and Billy Clapp Lake are part of the Main Canal (1951) of the Columbia Basin project. The canal is 8.3 miles (13.4 km), from Banks lake to Billy Clapp Lake. From the Billy Clap Lakes outlet, the lower reach of the Main Canal continues westward to divide into the East Low and West Canals near Adco on Washington 28. The canals' total length is about 21 miles (34 km), including about 5.33 miles (8.58 km) in Long Lake. By constructing Long Lake Dam, later renamed Pinto Dam, Reclamation utilized the coulee to avoid additional canal costs.

=== Billy Clapp Lake ===
Billy Clapp Lake formed behind Pinto Dam along the length of Long Lake Coulee. The coulee is the result of the Missoula Floods. The reservoir is 6 miles (9.7 km) long and .5 miles (0.80 km) wide with a maximum depth of 300 feet (91 m) feet. Previous to the creation of the reservoir, the basin contained five smaller lakes, i.e., Long, Coffee Pot, Pot, Cold Spring and July Lakes.

=== Pinto Dam ===
Pinto Dam, a zoned earth and rockfill structure, is 1,900 feet (580 m) long and 163 feet (50 m) high above bedrock. An uncontrolled open-channel emergency spillway is provided around the left abutment of the dam in a channel excavated in rock. Billy Clapp Headworks has radial gates to regulate the flow of water into the lower reach of the Main Canal.
