= Grand Coulee Dam =

Dam in the US state of Washington

- Location of the dam in the USA
- Interactive map of Grand Coulee Dam
- Country: United States
- Location: Grant and Okanogan counties, Washington
- Coordinates: 47.9572°N 118.9785°W
- Purpose: Power, regulation, irrigation
- Status: Operational
- Construction began: July 16, 1933 (93 years ago)
- Opening date: June 1, 1942 (84 years ago)
- Construction cost: Original dam: $163 million 1943; Third powerplant: $730 million 1973
- Operator: Bureau of Reclamation

Dam and spillways
- Type of dam: Concrete gravity
- Impounds: Columbia River
- Height: 550 ft (168 m)
- Length: 5,223 feet (1,592 m)
- Width (crest): 30 ft (9 m)
- Width (base): 500 ft (152 m)
- Dam volume: 11,975,520 cu yd (9,155,942 m^{3})
- Spillway type: Service, drum gate
- Spillway capacity: 1,000,000 cu ft/s (28,317 m^{3}/s)

Reservoir
- Creates: Franklin Delano Roosevelt Lake; Banks Lake
- Total capacity: 9,562,000 acre⋅ft (12 km^{3})
- Active capacity: 5,185,400 acre⋅ft (6 km^{3})
- Catchment area: 74,100 sq mi (191,918 km^{2})
- Surface area: 125 sq mi (324 km^{2})

Power Station
- Commission date: 1941–1950 (Left/Right); 1975–1980 (Third); 1973–1984 (PS)
- Type: Conventional, pumped-storage
- Hydraulic head: 380 ft (116 m)
- Turbines: 33: 27 × Francis turbines 6 × pump-generators
- Installed capacity: 6,809 MW; 7,079 MW (max)
- Capacity factor: 35%
- Annual generation: approx. 21.17 TWh (2022)
- Website www.usbr.gov/pn/grandcoulee/

The Grand Coulee Dam is a concrete gravity dam on the Columbia River in the U.S. state of Washington, built to produce hydroelectric power and provide irrigation water. Constructed between 1933 and 1942, Grand Coulee originally had two powerhouses. The third powerhouse ("Nat"), completed in 1974 to increase energy production, makes the Grand Coulee Dam the largest power station in the United States by nameplate capacity at 6,809 MW.

The proposal to build the dam was the focus of intense debate during the 1920s between two groups. One group wanted to irrigate the ancient Grand Coulee with a gravity canal while the other pursued a high dam and pumping scheme. The dam supporters won in 1933, but, although they fully intended otherwise, the initial proposal by the Bureau of Reclamation was for a "low dam" 290 feet (88 m) tall which would generate electricity without supporting irrigation. That year, the U.S. Bureau of Reclamation and a consortium of three companies called MWAK (Mason-Walsh-Atkinson Kier Company) began construction on a high dam, although they had received approval for a low dam. After visiting the construction site in August 1934, President Franklin Delano Roosevelt endorsed the "high dam" design, which at 550 ft (168 m) high would provide enough electricity to pump water into the Columbia basin for irrigation. Congress approved the high dam in 1935, and it was completed in 1942. The first waters overtopped the Grand Coulee Dam's spillway on June 1 of that year.

Power from the dam fueled the growing industries of the Northwest United States during World War II. Between 1967 and 1974, the third powerplant was constructed. The decision to construct the additional facility was influenced by growing energy demand, regulated river flows stipulated in the Columbia River Treaty with Canada, and competition with the Soviet Union. Through a series of upgrades and the installation of pump-generators, the dam now supplies four power stations with an installed capacity of 6,809 MW. As the centerpiece of the Columbia Basin Project, the dam's reservoir supplies water for the irrigation of 671,000 acres (2,700 km^{2}).

The reservoir is called Franklin Delano Roosevelt Lake, named after the president who endorsed the dam's construction. Creation of the reservoir forced the relocation of over 3,000 people, including Native Americans whose lands were flooded. The dam was constructed without fish passage. The next one downstream, Chief Joseph Dam, which was built decades later, also does not have fish passage. This means no salmon reach the Grand Coulee Dam or much of the Colville Indian Reservation.

== Background ==
The Grand Coulee is an ancient river bed on the Columbia Plateau created during the Pliocene Epoch (Calabrian) by retreating glaciers and floods. Originally, geologists believed a glacier that diverted the Columbia River formed the Grand Coulee, but it was revealed in the mid-late 20th century that massive floods from Lake Missoula carved most of the gorge. The earliest known proposal to irrigate the Grand Coulee with the Columbia River dates to 1892, when the Coulee City News and The Spokesman Review reported on a scheme by a man named Laughlin McLean to construct a 1,000 ft (305 m) dam across the Columbia River, high enough that water would back up into the Grand Coulee. A dam that size would have its reservoir encroach into Canada, which would violate treaties. Soon after the Bureau of Reclamation was founded, it investigated a scheme for pumping water from the Columbia River to irrigate parts of central Washington. An attempt to raise funds for irrigation failed in 1914, as Washington voters rejected a bond measure.

Such a power if developed would operate railroads, factories, mines, irrigation pumps, furnish heat and light in such measure that all in all it would be the most unique, the most interesting, and the most remarkable development of both irrigation and power in this age of industrial and scientific miracles.

— Rufus Woods

In 1917, William M. Clapp, a lawyer from Ephrata, Washington, proposed the Columbia be dammed immediately below the Grand Coulee. He suggested a concrete dam could flood the plateau, just as nature blocked it with ice centuries ago. Clapp was joined by James O'Sullivan, another lawyer, and by Rufus Woods, publisher of The Wenatchee World newspaper in the nearby agricultural centre of Wenatchee. Together, they became known as the "Dam College". Woods began promoting the Grand Coulee Dam in his newspaper, often with articles written by O'Sullivan.

The dam idea gained popularity with the public in 1918. Backers of reclamation in Central Washington split into two camps. The "pumpers" favored a dam with pumps to elevate water from the river into the Grand Coulee from which canals and pipes could irrigate farmland. The "ditchers" favored diverting water from northeast Washington's Pend Oreille River via a gravity canal to irrigate farmland in Central and Eastern Washington. Many locals such as Woods, O'Sullivan and Clapp were pumpers, while many influential businessmen in Spokane associated with the Washington Water and Power Company (WWPC) were staunch ditchers. The pumpers argued that hydroelectricity from the dam could cover costs and claimed the ditchers sought to maintain a monopoly on electric power.

The ditchers took several steps to ensure support for their proposals. In 1921, WWPC secured a preliminary permit to build a dam at Kettle Falls, about 110 mi (177 km) upstream from the Grand Coulee. If built, the Kettle Falls Dam would have lain in the path of the Grand Coulee Dam's reservoir, essentially blocking its construction. WWPC planted rumors in the newspapers, stating exploratory drilling at the Grand Coulee site found no granite on which a dam's foundations could rest, only clay and fragmented rock. This was later disproved with Reclamation-ordered drilling. Ditchers hired General George W. Goethals, engineer of the Panama Canal, to prepare a report. Goethals visited the state and produced a report backing the ditchers. The Bureau of Reclamation was unimpressed by Goethals' report, believing it filled with errors.

In July 1923, President Warren G. Harding visited Washington state and expressed support for irrigation work there, but died a month later. His successor, Calvin Coolidge, had little interest in irrigation projects. The Bureau of Reclamation, desirous of a major project that would bolster its reputation, was focusing on the Boulder Canyon Project that resulted in the Hoover Dam. Reclamation was authorized to conduct a study in 1923, but the project's cost made federal officials reluctant. The Washington state proposals received little support from those further east, who feared the irrigation would result in more crops, depressing prices. With President Coolidge opposed to the project, bills to appropriate money for surveys of the Grand Coulee site failed.

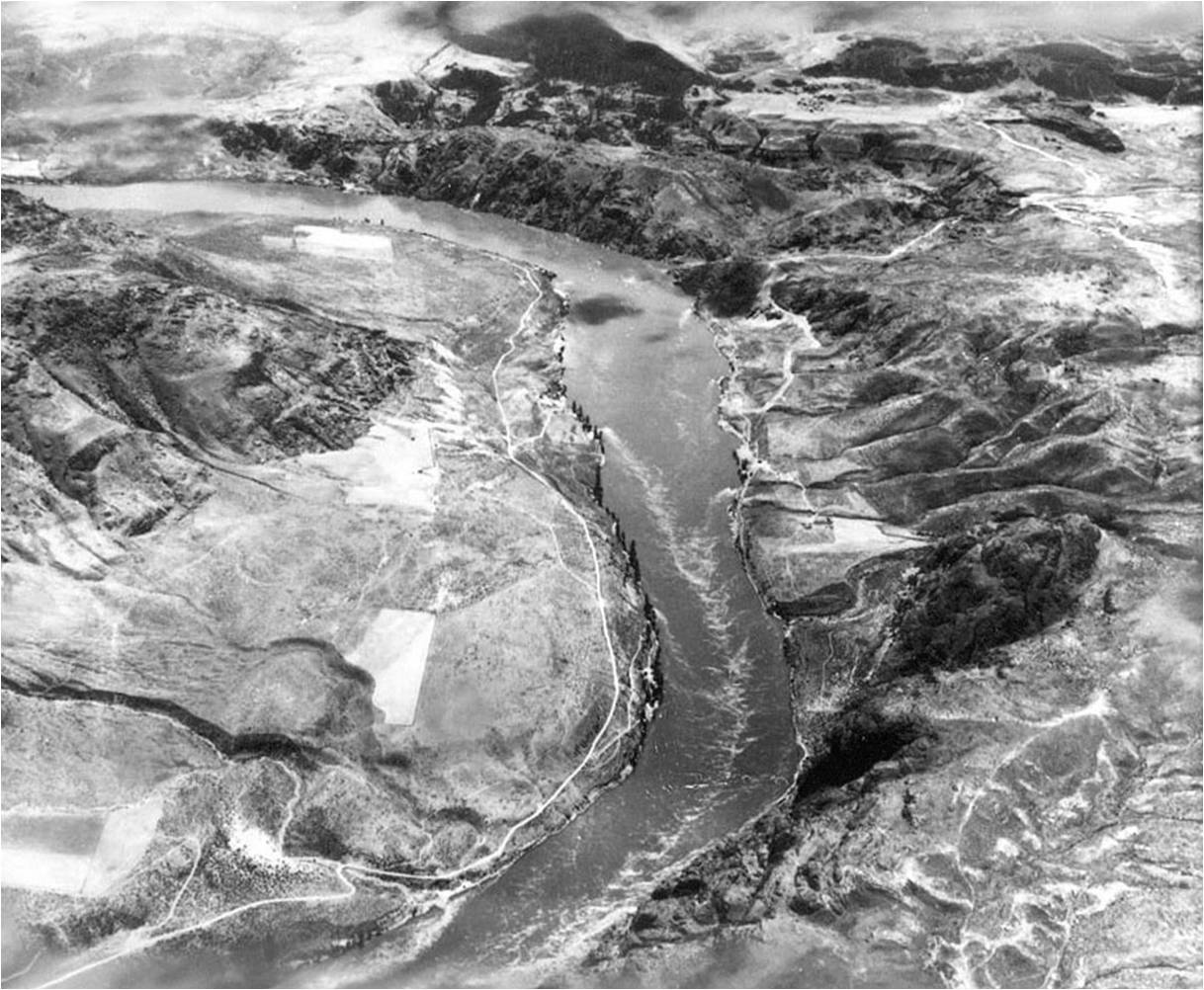
The dam site before construction, looking south

In 1925, Congress authorized a U.S. Army Corps of Engineers study of the Columbia River. This study was included in the Rivers and Harbors Act of March 1925, which provided for studies on the navigation, power, flood control and irrigation potential of rivers. In April 1926, the Army Corps responded with the first of the "308 Reports" named after the 1925 House Document No. 308 (69th Congress, 1st Session). With the help of Washington's Senators, Wesley Jones and Clarence Dill, Congress ordered $600,000 in further studies to be carried out by the Army Corps and Federal Power Commission on the Columbia River Basin and Snake Rivers. U.S. Army Major John Butler was responsible for the upper Columbia River and Snake River and in 1932, his 1,000-page report was submitted to Congress. It recommended the Grand Coulee Dam and nine others on the river, including some in Canada. The report stated electricity sales from the Grand Coulee Dam could pay for construction costs. Reclamation—whose interest in the dam was revitalized by the report—endorsed it.

Although there was support for the Grand Coulee Dam, others argued there was little need for more electricity in the Northwest and crops were in surplus. The Army Corps did not believe construction should be a federal project and saw low demand for electricity. Reclamation argued energy demand would rise by the time the dam was complete. The head of Reclamation, Elwood Mead, stated he wanted the dam built no matter the cost. President Franklin D. Roosevelt, who took office in March 1933, supported the dam because of its irrigation potential and the power it would provide, but he was uneasy with its $450 million price tag. For this reason, he supported a 290 ft (88 m) "low dam" instead of the 550 ft (168 m) "high dam". He provided $63 million in federal funding, while Washington State provided $377,000. In 1933, Washington governor Clarence Martin set up the Columbia Basin Commission to oversee the dam project, and Reclamation was selected to oversee construction.

== Construction ==
=== Low dam ===
On July 16, 1933, a crowd of 3,000 witnessed the driving of the first stake at the low dam site, marking the start of excavation. Core drilling began in September, while the Bureau of Reclamation accelerated its studies and designs for the dam. The structure was intended to control floods and provide irrigation and hydroelectric power, albeit at a reduced capacity. However, it would not raise the reservoir high enough to irrigate the plateau surrounding the Grand Coulee. The design allowed for the possibility of future height increases and upgrades.

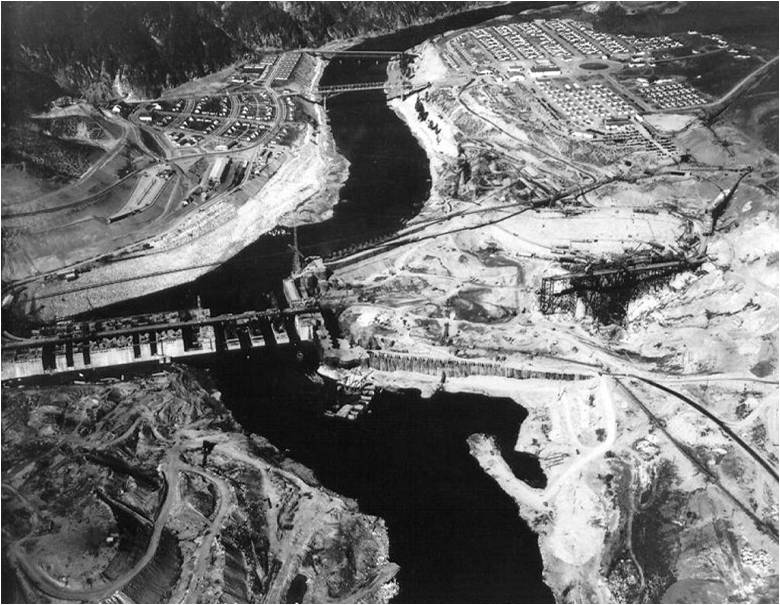
The east-side cofferdam after the west base was complete

Before and during construction, workers and engineers experienced problems. Contracts for companies to construct the various parts of the dam were difficult to award as few companies were sizable enough to fill them. This forced companies to consolidate. Native American graves had to be relocated and temporary fish ladders had to be constructed. During construction additional problems included landslides and the need to protect newly poured concrete from freezing. Construction on the downstream Grand Coulee Bridge began in May 1934 and more considerable earth-moving began in August. Excavation for the dam's foundation required the removal of 22 million cubic yards (17 million m³) of dirt and stone.

To reduce the amount of trucking required in the excavation, a conveyor belt nearly 2 mi (3.2 km) long was built. To further secure the foundation, workers drilled 660–880 ft (200–270 m) holes into the granite and filled any fissures with grout, creating a grout curtain. At times, excavated areas collapsed from overburden. In order to secure these areas from further movement and continue excavation, 3-inch (76 mm) diameter pipes were inserted into the mass and chilled with cold liquid from a refrigeration plant. This froze the earth and secured it so construction could continue.

Final contract bidding for the dam began June 18, 1934, in Spokane, and four bids were submitted. One bid was from a lawyer with no financial backing; another was from actress Mae West which consisted of nothing more than a poem and promise to divert the river. Of the two serious bids, the lowest bid was from a consortium of three companies: Silas Mason Co. from Louisville, Kentucky; Walsh Construction Co. of Davenport, Iowa and New York; and Atkinson-Kier Company of San Francisco and San Diego. The consortium was known as MWAK, and their bid was $29,339,301, almost 15% lower than the $34.5 million option submitted by the next bidder, Six Companies, Inc., which was building Hoover Dam at the time.

=== Cofferdams ===
Two large cofferdams were constructed for the dam, but they were parallel to the river rather than straddling its width, so drilling into the canyon walls was not required. By the end of 1935 about 1,200 workers completed the west and east cofferdams. The west cofferdam was 2,000 ft (610 m) long, 50 ft (15 m) thick and was constructed 110 ft (34 m) above the bedrock. The cofferdams allowed workers to dry portions of the riverbed and begin constructing the dam, while water continued to flow down the center of the riverbed.

In August 1936, once the west foundation was complete, portions of the west cofferdam were dismantled, allowing water to flow through part of the dam's new foundation. In February 1936, MWAK had begun constructing cofferdams above and below the channel between the east and west cofferdams. By December, the entire Columbia River was diverted over the foundations constructed within the east and west cofferdams. On December 15, 1936, the Wenatchee Daily World announced the river was diverted and by early the next year, people were arriving in large numbers to see the riverbed.

=== Design change ===
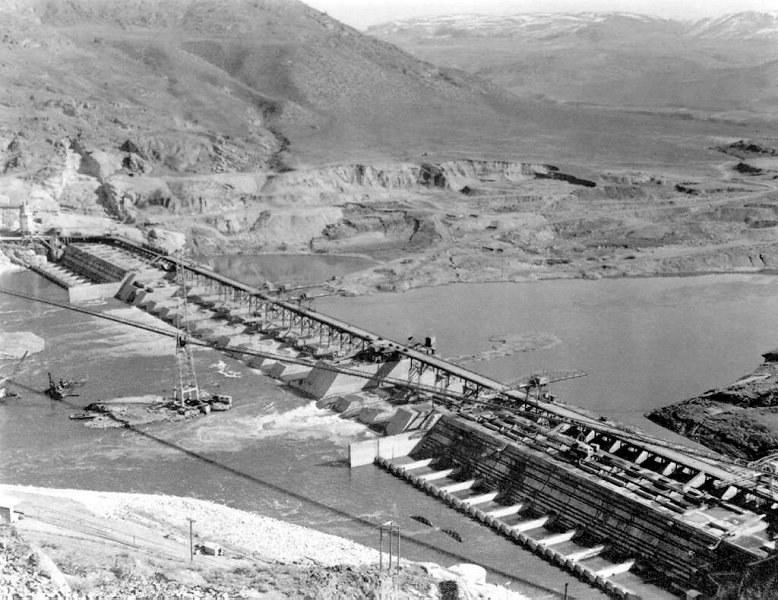
The base of the dam in 1938

On August 4, 1934, President Franklin D. Roosevelt visited the construction site and was impressed by the project and its purpose. He spoke to workers and spectators, closing with this statement: "I leave here today with the feeling that this work is well undertaken; that we are going ahead with a useful project, and we are going to see it through for the benefit of our country." Soon afterward, Reclamation was allowed to proceed with the high dam plan but faced the problems of transitioning the design and negotiating an altered contract with MWAK. In June 1935, for an additional $7 million, MWAK and Six Companies, Inc. agreed to join together as Consolidated Builders Inc. and construct the high dam. Six Companies had just finished the Hoover Dam and was nearing completion of Parker Dam. The new design, chosen and approved by the Reclamation office in Denver, included several improvements, one of which was the irrigation pumping plant.

Roosevelt envisioned the dam would fit into his New Deal under the Public Works Administration; it would create jobs and farming opportunities and would pay for itself. In addition, as part of a larger public effort, Roosevelt wanted to keep electricity prices low by limiting private ownership of utility companies, which could charge high prices for energy. Many opposed a federal takeover of the project, including its most prominent supporters, but Washington State lacked the resources to fully realize the project. In August 1935, with the help of Roosevelt and a Supreme Court decision allowing the acquisition of public land and Indian Reservations, Congress authorized funding for the upgraded high dam under the 1935 River and Harbors Act. The most significant legislative hurdle for the dam was over:

That for the purpose of controlling floods, improving navigation, regulating the flow of the streams of the United States, providing for storage and for the delivery of the stored waters thereof, for the reclamation of public lands and Indian reservations, and other beneficial uses, and for the generation of electric energy as a means of financially aiding and assisting such undertakings the projects known as "Parker Dam" on the Colorado River and "Grand Coulee Dam" on the Columbia River are hereby authorized and adopted.

— 1935 Rivers and Harbors Act SEC 2, August 30, 1935, [H.R. 6250] [Public, No. 409]

=== First concrete pour and completion ===
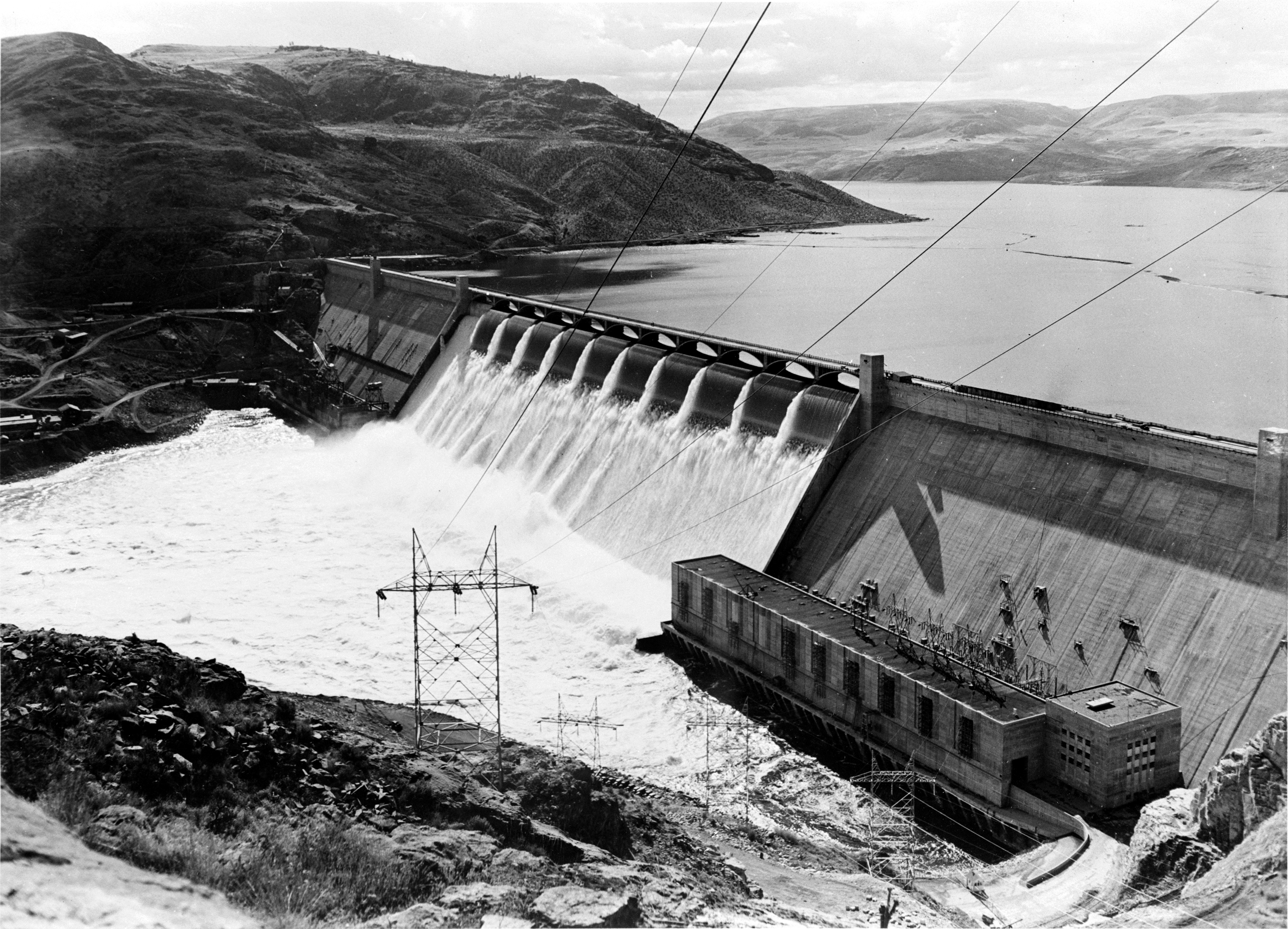
The dam after completion, with water moving into the spillway

On December 6, 1935, Governor Clarence Martin presided over the ceremonial first concrete pour. During construction, bulk concrete was delivered on site by rail-cars where it was further processed by eight large mixers before being placed in form. Concrete was poured into 50 ft^{2} (4.6 m^{2}) columns by crane-lifted buckets, each supporting eight tons of concrete. To cool the concrete and facilitate curing, about 2,000 mi (3,200 km) of piping was placed throughout the hardening mass. Cold water from the river was pumped into the pipes, reducing the temperature within the forms from 105 °F (41 °C) to 45 °F (7 °C). This caused the dam to contract about 8 inches (20 cm) in length; the resulting gaps were filled with grout.

Until the project began, the stretch of the Columbia River where the dam was to rise was as yet unbridged, making it difficult to move men and materials. In January 1936, the Grand Coulee Bridge, a permanent highway bridge, was opened after major delays caused by high water. Three additional and temporary bridges downstream had moved vehicles and workers along with sand and gravel for cement mixing. In March 1938, MWAK completed the lower dam and Consolidated Builders Inc. began constructing the high dam. In December 1939, the west power house was completed. About 5,500 workers were on site that year. Between 1940 and 1941, the dam's eleven floodgates were installed on the spillway. In January 1941, the dam's first generator went into operation. On June 1, 1942, the reservoir was full and the first water flowed over the dam's spillway. On January 31, 1943, work was officially complete. The last of the original 18 generators did not operate until 1949.

=== Reservoir clearing ===
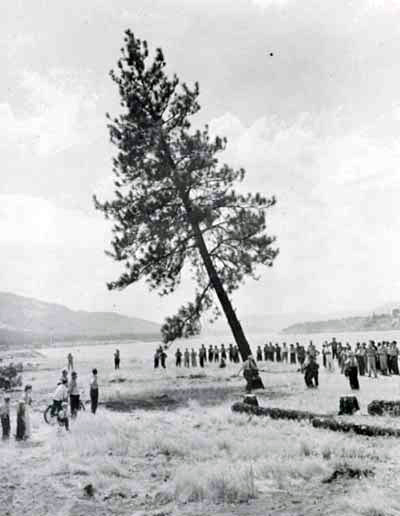
Banks and Smith felling the last tree in the reservoir zone, 1941

In 1933, Reclamation began efforts to purchase land behind the dam as far as 151 mi (243 km) upstream for the future reservoir zone. The reservoir, known later as Lake Roosevelt, flooded 70,500 acres (285 km^{2}) and Reclamation acquired an additional 11,500 acres (47 km^{2}) around the future shoreline. Within the zone were eleven towns, two railroads, three state highways, about one hundred and fifty miles of country roads, four sawmills, fourteen bridges, four telegraph and telephone systems, and many power lines and cemeteries. All facilities had to be purchased or relocated, and 3,000 residents were relocated. The Anti-Speculation Act was passed in 1937, limiting the amount of land farmers could own to prevent inflated prices.

The government appraised the land and offered to purchase it from the affected residents. Many refused to accept the offers, and Reclamation filed condemnation suits. Members of the Colville Confederated and Spokane tribes who had settlements within the reservoir zone were also resettled. The Acquisition of Indian Lands for Grand Coulee Dam Act of June 29, 1940, allowed the Secretary of the Interior to acquire land on the Colville and Spokane Reservations, eventually accounting for 21,100 acres (85 km^{2}). By 1942, all land had been purchased at market value: a cost of $10.5 million that included the relocation of farms, bridges, highways and railroads. Relocation reimbursement was not offered to property owners, which was common until U.S. laws changed in 1958.

In late 1938, the Works Progress Administration began clearing what would be 54,000 acres (220 km^{2}) of trees and other plants. The cut timber was floated downstream and sold to the highest bidder, Lincoln Lumber Company, which paid $2.25 per thousand board feet, equivalent to $51 in 2025. The pace of clearing was accelerated in April 1941 when it was declared a national defense project, and the last tree was felled on July 19, 1941. The felling was done by Reclamation Supervising Engineer Frank A. Banks and State WPA Administrator Carl W. Smith during a ceremony. 2,626 people living in five main camps along the Columbia worked on the project. When it was finished, $4.9 million had been spent in labor.

=== Labor and supporting infrastructure ===
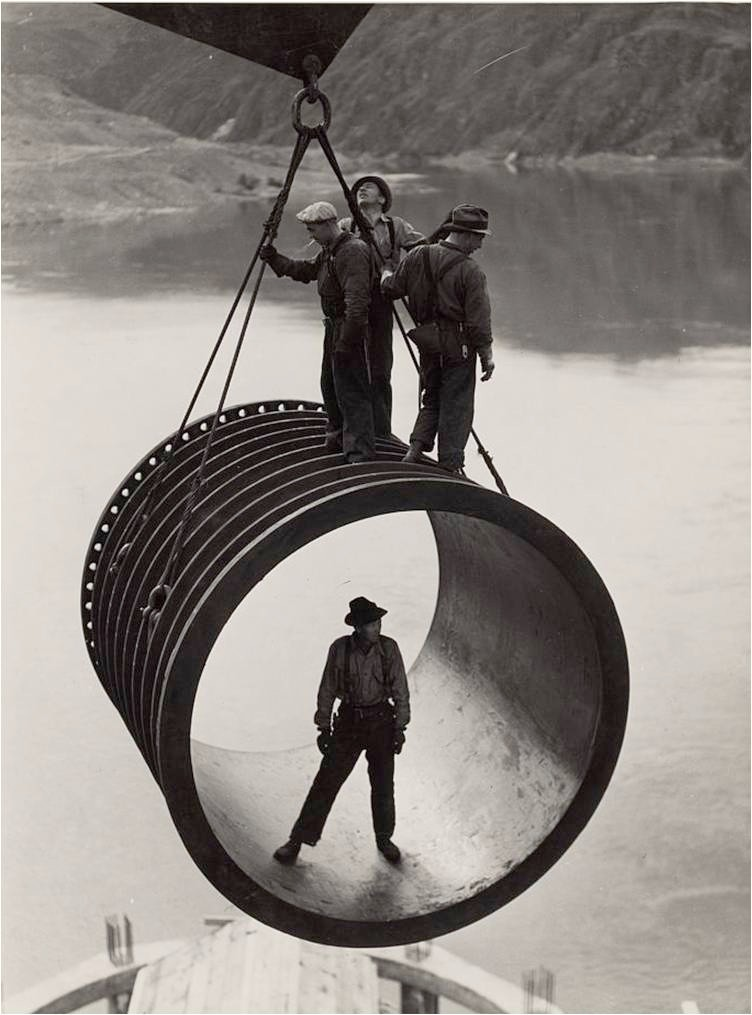
Workers installing a penstock section

Workers building the dam received an average of 80¢ an hour; the payroll for the dam was among the largest in the nation. The workers were mainly pulled from Grant, Lincoln, Douglas, and Okanogan counties and women were allowed to work only in the dorms and the cookhouse. Around 8,000 people worked on the project, and Frank A. Banks served as the chief construction engineer. Bert A. Hall was the chief inspector who would accept the dam from the contractors. Orin G. Patch served as the chief of concrete. Construction conditions were dangerous and 77 workers died.

To prepare for construction, housing for workers was needed along with four bridges downstream of the dam site, one of which, the Grand Coulee Bridge, exists today. The Bureau of Reclamation provided housing and located their administrative building at Engineer's Town, which was directly downstream of the construction site on the west side of the river. Opposite Engineer's Town, MWAK constructed Mason City in 1934. Mason City contained a hospital, post office, electricity and other amenities along with a population of 3,000. Three-bedroom houses in the city were rented for $32 a month.

Of the two living areas, Engineer's City was considered to have the better housing. Several other living areas formed around the construction site in an area known as Shack Town, which did not have reliable access to electricity and the same amenities as the other towns. Incorporated in 1935, the city of Grand Coulee supported workers as well and is just west of the dam on the plateau. MWAK eventually sold Mason City to Reclamation in 1937 before its contract was completed. In 1956, Reclamation combined both Mason City and Engineer's Town to form the city of Coulee Dam. It was incorporated as a city in February 1959.

=== Irrigation pumps ===
With the onset of World War II, power generation was given priority over irrigation. In 1943, Congress authorized the Columbia Basin Project and the Bureau of Reclamation began construction of irrigation facilities in 1948. Directly to the west and above the Grand Coulee Dam, the North Dam was constructed. This dam, along with the Dry Falls Dam to the south, enclosed and created Banks Lake, which covered the northern 27 mi (43 km) of the Grand Coulee. Additional dams, such as the Pinto and O'Sullivan Dams, were constructed alongside siphons and canals, creating a vast irrigation supply network called the Columbia Basin Project. Irrigation began between 1951 and 1953 as six of the 12 pumps were installed and Banks Lake was filled.

== Expansion ==
=== Third powerplant ===
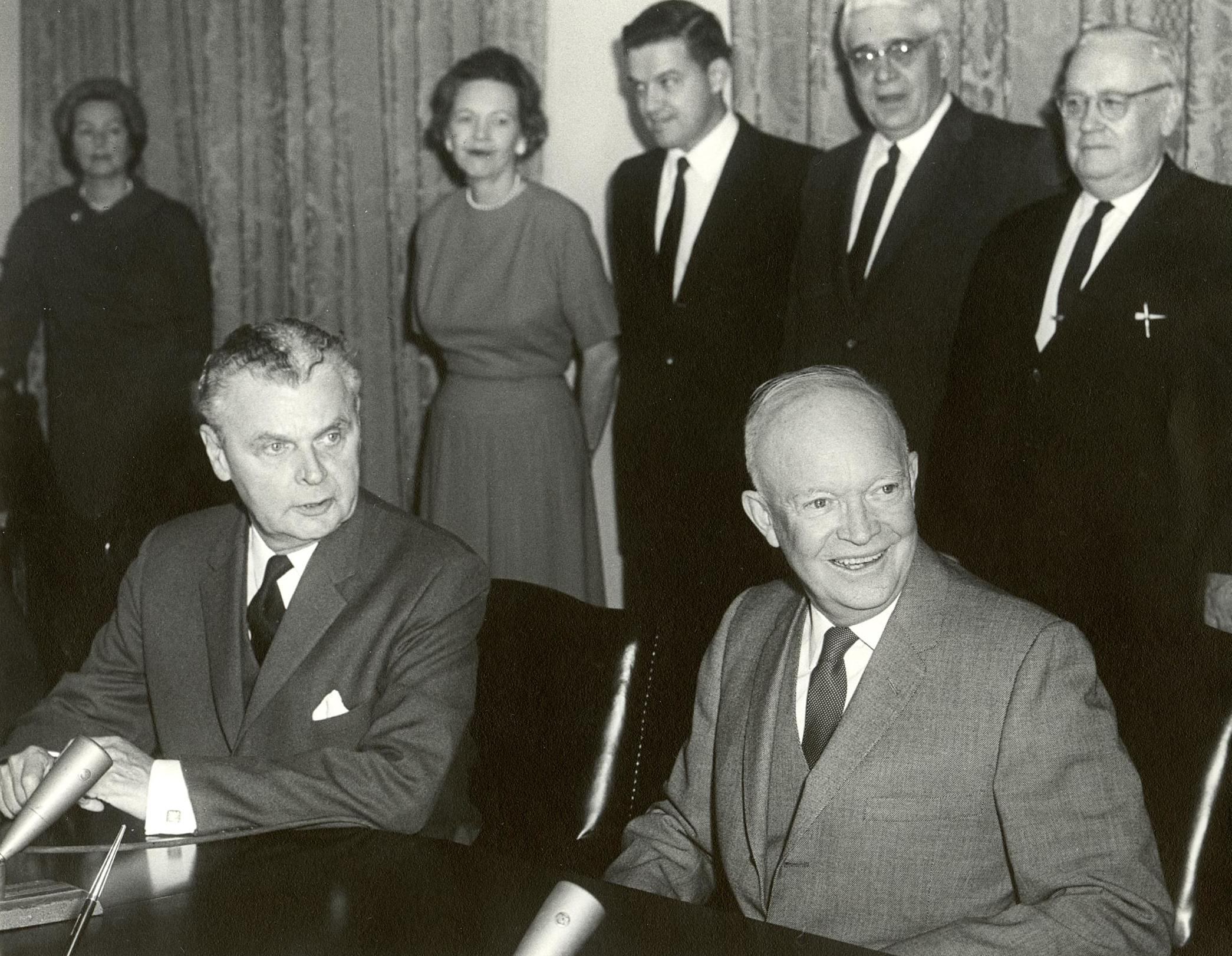
Canadian Prime Minister John Diefenbaker (seated left) and US President Dwight Eisenhower at the signing of the Columbia River Treaty, 1961

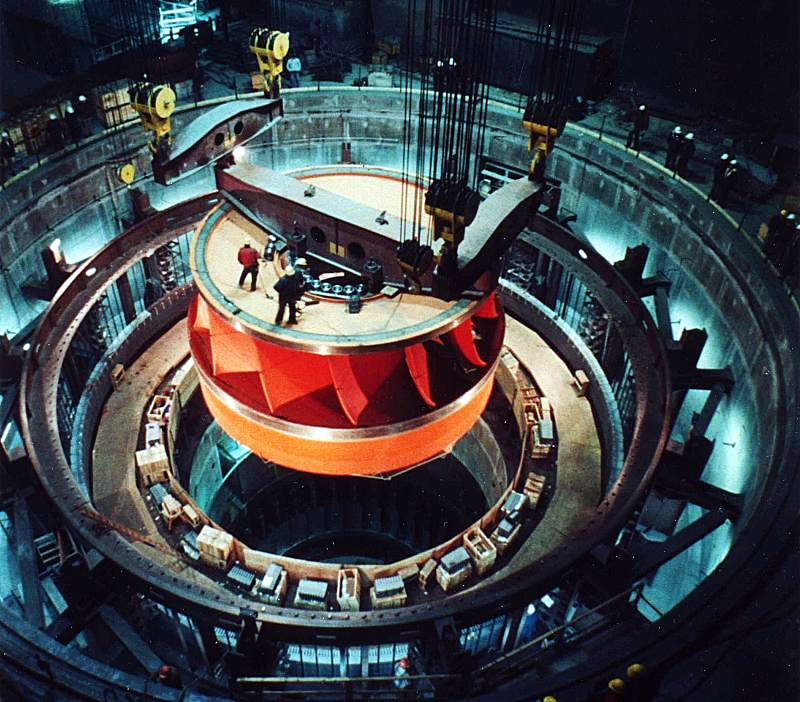
One of the new turbines in the Third Powerplant

After World War II, the growing demand for electricity sparked interest in constructing another power plant supported by the Grand Coulee Dam. One obstacle to an additional power plant was the great seasonality of the Columbia River's streamflow. Today the flow is closely managed—there is almost no seasonality. Historically, about 75% of the river's annual flow occurred between April and September. During low flow periods, the river's discharge was between 50,000 cu ft/s (1,400 m^{3}/s) and 80,000 cu ft/s (2,300 m^{3}/s) while maximum spring runoff flows were around 500,000 cu ft/s (14,000 m^{3}/s). Only nine out of the dam's eighteen generators could run year-round. The remaining nine operated for less than six months a year. In 1952, Congress authorized $125,000 for Reclamation to conduct a feasibility study on the Third Powerplant which was completed in 1953 and recommended two locations. Nine identical 108 MW generators were recommended, but as matters stood, they would be able to operate only in periods of high water.

Further regulation of the Columbia's flows was necessary to make the new power plant feasible. It would require water storage and regulation projects in Canada and a treaty to resolve the many economic and political issues involved. The Bureau of Reclamation and Army Corps of Engineers explored alternatives that would not depend on a treaty with Canada, such as raising the level of Flathead Lake or Pend Oreille Lake, but both proposals faced strong local opposition. The Columbia River Treaty, which had been discussed between the U.S. and Canada since 1944, was seen as the answer. Efforts to build the Third Powerplant were also influenced by competition with the Soviet Union, which had constructed power plants on the Volga River larger than the Grand Coulee Dam.

On September 16, 1964, the Columbia River Treaty was ratified and included an agreement by Canada to construct the Duncan, Keenleyside, Mica Dams upstream and the U.S. would build the Libby Dam in Montana. Shortly afterward, Washington Senator Henry M. Jackson, who was influential in constructing the new power plant, announced Reclamation would present the project to Congress for appropriation and funding. To keep up with Soviet competition and increase the generating capacity it was determined the generators could be upgraded to much larger designs. With the possibility of international companies bidding on the project, the Soviets, who had just installed a 500 MW hydroelectric generator on the Yenisei River, indicated their interest. To avoid the potential embarrassment of an international rival building a domestic power plant, the Department of the Interior declined international bidding. The Third Powerplant was approved and President Lyndon Johnson signed its appropriation bill on June 14, 1966.

Between 1967 and 1974, the dam was expanded to add the Third Powerplant, with architectural design by Marcel Breuer. Beginning in July 1967, this involved demolishing the northeast side of the dam and building a new fore-bay section. The excavation of 22,000,000 cu yd (16,820,207 m^{3}) of dirt and rock had been completed before the new 1,725 ft (526 m) long section of dam was built. The addition made the original 4,300 ft (1,300 m) dam almost a mile long. Original designs for the powerhouse had twelve smaller units but were altered to incorporate six of the largest generators available. To supply them with water, six 40 ft (12 m) diameter penstocks were installed. Of the new turbines and generators, three 600 MW units were built by Westinghouse and three 700 MW units by General Electric. The first new generator was commissioned in 1975 and the final one in 1980. The three 700 MW units were later upgraded to 805 MW by Siemens.

=== Pump-generating plant ===
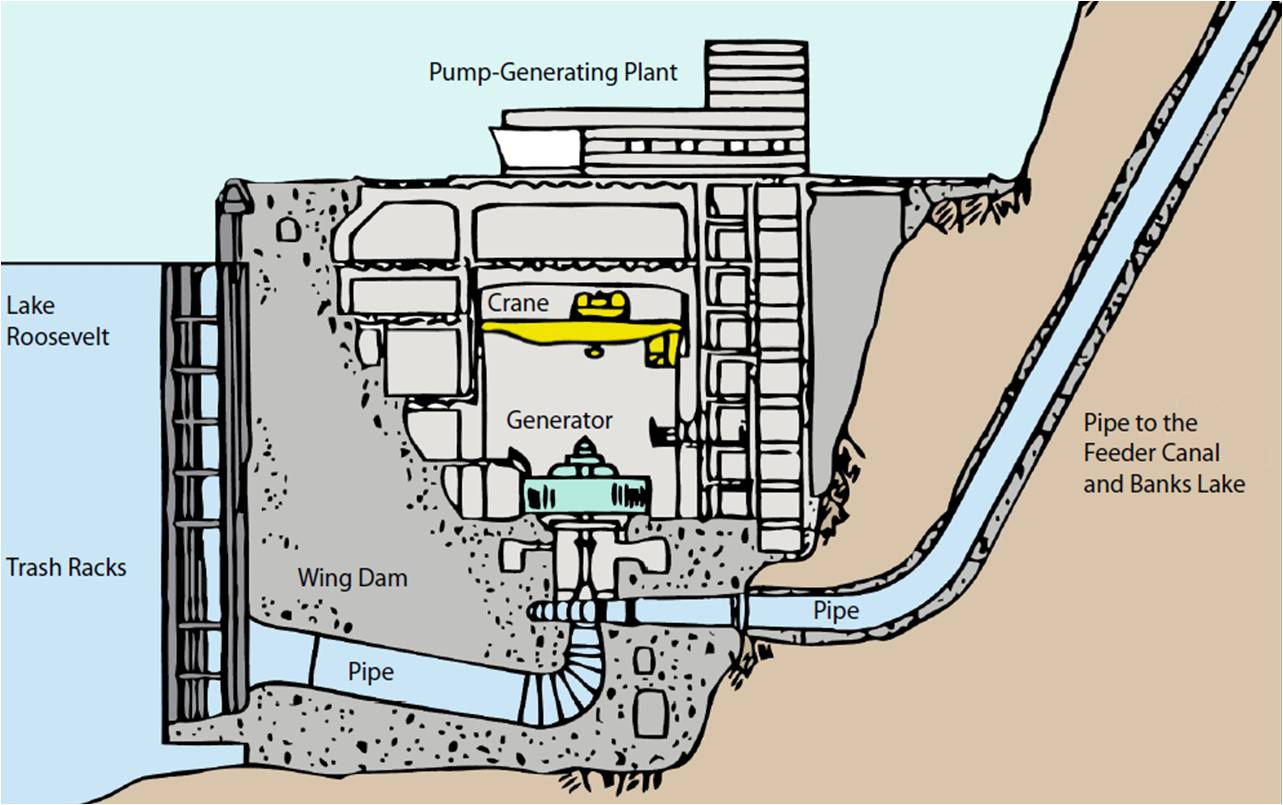
Cross-section of the Pump-Generating Plant

After power shortages in the Northwest during the 1960s, it was determined the six remaining planned pumps be pump-generators. When energy demand is high, the pump-generators can generate electricity with water from the Banks Lake feeder canal adjacent to the dam at a higher elevation. By 1973, the Pump-Generating Plant was completed and the first two generators (P/G-7 and P/G-8) were operational. In 1983, two more generators went online, and by January 1984 the final two were operational. The six pump-generators added 314 MW to the dam's capacity. In May 2009, the Pump-Generating Plant was officially renamed the John W. Keys III Pump-Generating Power Plant after John W. Keys III, the U.S. Bureau of Reclamation's commissioner from 2001 to 2006.

=== Overhauls ===
A major overhaul of the Third Powerplant, which contains generators numbered G19 through G24, began in March 2008 and will be continuing for many years. Among the projects to be completed before the generators themselves can begin to be overhauled include replacing underground 500 kV oil-filled cables for G19, G20 and G21 generators with overhead transmission lines (started in February 2009), new 236 MW transformers for G19 and G20 (started in November 2006), and several other projects.

Planning, design, procurement and site preparation for the 805 MW G22, G23 and G24 generator overhauls are scheduled to begin in 2011. The overhauls will start in 2013 with the G22 generator, then G23 starting in 2014, and finally G24 starting in 2016, with planned completions in 2014, 2016 and 2017, respectively. The generator overhauls for G19, G20 and G21 have not been scheduled as of 2010.

== Operation and benefits ==
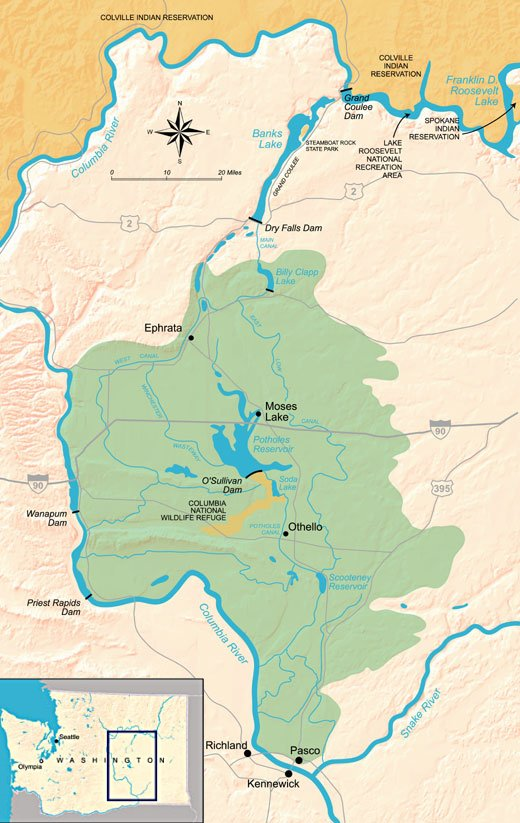
A map of the Columbia Basin Project. Green denotes land irrigated by the project. The Grand Coulee Dam is in the top-right.

The dam's primary goal, irrigation, was postponed as the wartime need for electricity increased. The dam's powerhouse began production around the time World War II began, and its electricity was vital to the war effort. The dam powered aluminum smelters in Longview and Vancouver, Washington, Boeing factories in Seattle and Vancouver, and Portland's shipyards. In 1943, its electricity was also used for plutonium production in Richland, Washington, at the Hanford Site, which was part of the top-secret Manhattan Project. The demand for power at that project was so great that in 1943, two generators originally intended for the Shasta Dam in California were installed at the Grand Coulee Dam to hurry the generator installation schedule.

=== Irrigation ===
Water is pumped via the Pump-Generating Plant's 12-foot (3.7 m) diameter pipes 280 ft (85 m) from Lake Roosevelt to a 1.6 mi (2.6 km) feeder canal. From the feeder canal, the water is transferred to Banks Lake which has an active storage of 715,000 acre⋅ft (882 million m^{3}). The plant's twelve 65,000–70,000 horsepower (48,000–52,000 kW) pumps can transfer up to 1,605 cu ft/s (45 m^{3}/s) to the lake. Currently, the Columbia Basin Project irrigates 670,000 acres (2,700 km^{2}) with a potential for 1.1 million. Over 60 different crops are grown within the project and distributed throughout the United States.

=== Power ===
Grand Coulee Dam supports four different power houses containing 33 hydroelectric generators. The original Left and Right Powerhouses contain 18 main generators and the Left has an additional three service generators for total installed capacity of 2,280 MW.

The first generator was commissioned in 1941 and all 18 were operating by 1950. The Third Power plant contains a total of six main generators with a 4,215 MW installed capacity. Generators G-19, G-20 and G-21 in the Third Power Plant have a 600 MW installed capacity but can operate at a maximum capacity of 690 MW which brings the overall maximum capacity of the dam's power facilities to 7,079 MW. The Pump-Generating Plant contains six pump-generators with an installed capacity of 314 MW. When pumping water into Banks Lake, they consume 600 MW of electricity.

Each generator is supplied with water by an individual penstock. The largest of these feed the Third Power Plant and are 40 ft (12 m) in diameter and can supply up to 35,000 cu ft/s (990 m^{3}/s). The dam's power facilities originally had an installed capacity of 1,974 MW but expansions and upgrades have increased generation to 6,809 MW installed, 7,079 MW maximum.

In 2022, Grand Coulee Dam generated 21.17 TWh of electricity, amounting to a capacity factor efficiency of 35%.

Hydroelectric generators at the Grand Coulee Dam
Location	Type	Quantity	Capacity (MW)	Total capacity (MW)
Left Powerhouse	Francis turbine, service generator	3 (LS1-LS3)	10	30
Left Powerhouse	Francis turbine, main generator	9 (G1-G9)	125	1,125
Right Powerhouse	Francis turbine, main generator	9 (G10-G18)	125	1,125
Third Power Plant	Francis turbine, main generator	3 (G22-G24)	805	2,415
Third Power Plant	Francis turbine, main generator	3 (G19-G21)	600 (Max: 690 MW)	1,800
Pump-Generating Plant	Pump-generator, peak generator	4 (PG9-PG12)	53.5	214
Pump-Generating Plant	Pump-generator, peak generator	2 (PG7-PG8)	50	100
Totals		33		6,809

=== Spillway ===
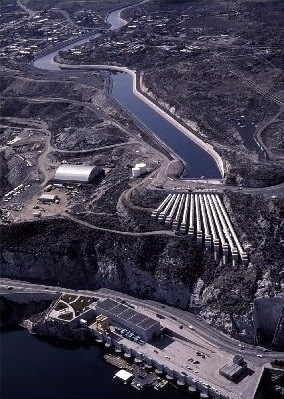
Pump-Generating Plant and Roosevelt Lake at bottom, feeder canal to Banks Lake at top

The Grand Coulee Dam's spillway is 1,650 feet (500 m) long and is an overflow, drum-gate controlled type with a 1,000,000 cu ft/s (28,000 m^{3}/s) maximum capacity. A record flood in May and June 1948 flooded the lowlands below the dam and highlighted its limited flood control capability at the time, as its spillway and turbines hit a record flow of 637,800-cubic-foot-per-second (18,060 m^{3}/s). The flood damaged downstream riverbanks and deteriorated the face of the dam and its flip bucket at the base (toe) of the spillway. The flood spurred the Columbia River Treaty and its provisions for dams constructed upstream in Canada, which would regulate the Columbia's flow.

=== Cost benefits ===
The Bureau of Reclamation in 1932 estimated the cost of constructing the Grand Coulee Dam (not including the Third Powerplant) to be $168 million; its actual cost was $163 million in 1943 ($2.42 billion in 2025 dollars). Expenses to finish the power stations and repair design flaws with the dam throughout the 1940s and '50s added another $107 million, bringing the total cost to $270 million ($2.59 billion in 2025 dollars), about 33% over estimates. The Third Powerplant was estimated to cost $390 million in 1967, but higher construction costs and labor disputes drove the project's final cost in 1973 to $730 million ($4.03 billion in 2025 dollars), about 87% over estimates. Despite estimates being exceeded, the dam became an economic success, particularly with the Third Powerplant exhibiting a benefit-cost ratio of 2:1. Although Reclamation has only irrigated about half of the land predicted, the gross value of crop output (in constant dollars) had doubled from 1962 to 1992, largely due to different farming practices and crop choices. The Bureau expects the money earned from supplying power and irrigation water will pay off the cost of construction by 2044.

== Environmental and social consequences ==
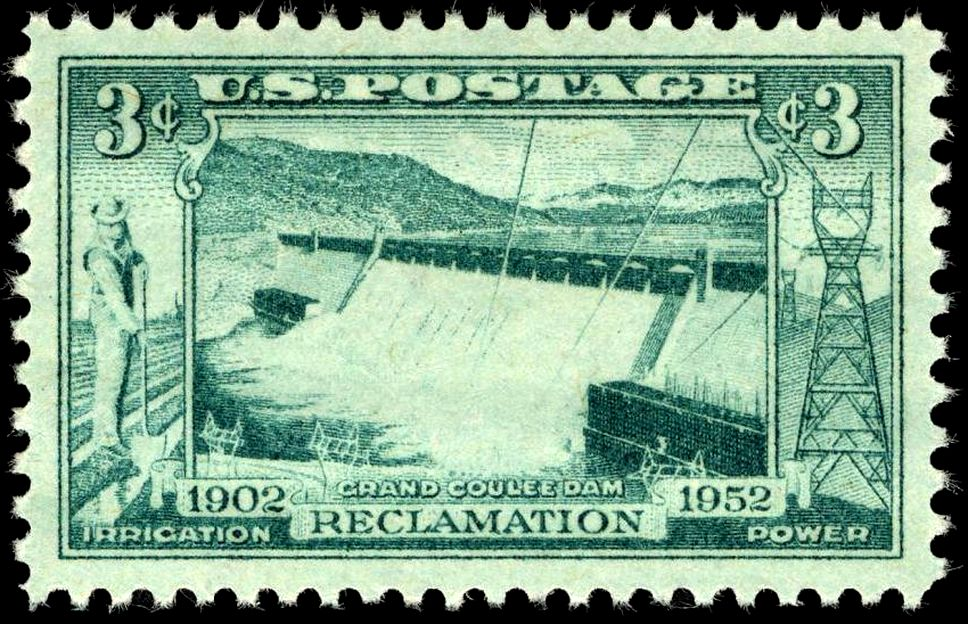
Grand Coulee Dam commemorative stamp, issued 1952

The dam had severe negative consequences for the local Native American tribes whose traditional way of life revolved around salmon and the original shrub steppe habitat of the area. Because it lacks a fish ladder, the Grand Coulee Dam permanently blocks fish migration, removing over 1,100 mi (1,770 km) of natural spawning habitat. By largely eliminating anadromous fish above the Okanogan River, the Grand Coulee Dam also set the stage for the subsequent decision not to provide for fish passage at Chief Joseph Dam (built in 1953). Chinook, Steelhead, Sockeye and Coho salmon (as well as other important species, including Lamprey) are now unable to spawn in the reaches of the Upper Columbia Basin. The lack of fish passage to the upper reaches of the Columbia River wiped out the June hogs, so-called "supersalmon" known to regularly weigh over 80 pounds (36 kg). Today, the largest Chinook caught on the Columbia River are less than half that size. The extinction of the spawning grounds upstream from the dam has prevented the Spokane and other tribes from holding sacred salmon ceremonies since 1940.

The Grand Coulee Dam flooded over 21,000 acres (85 km^{2}) of prime bottom land where Native Americans had been living and hunting for thousands of years, forcing the relocation of settlements and graveyards. The Office of Indian Affairs negotiated with the United States Bureau of Reclamation on behalf of tribes who were concerned about the flooding of their grave sites. The Acquisition of Indian Lands for Grand Coulee Dam, 54 Stat.703 Act of June 20, 1940, allowed the Secretary of the Interior to remove human remains to new Native American grave sites. The burial relocation project started in September 1939. Human remains were put into small containers and many artifacts were discovered, but the methods of collection destroyed archaeological evidence. Various estimates for the number of relocated graves in 1939 include 915 graves reported by the Bureau of Reclamation Reclamation, or 1,388 reported by Howard T. Ball, who supervised the field work. Tribal leaders reported another 2,000 graves in 1940, but the Bureau of Reclamation would not continue grave relocation, and the sites were soon covered by water.

The town of Inchelium, Washington, home to around 250 Colville Indians, was submerged and later relocated. Kettle Falls, once a primary Native American fishing grounds, was also inundated. The average catch of over 600,000 salmon per year was eliminated. In one study, the Army Corps of Engineers estimated the annual loss was over 1 million fish. In June 1940, the Confederated Tribes of the Colville Reservation hosted a three-day event called the "Ceremony of Tears", marking the end of fishing at Kettle Falls. Within a year after the Ceremony, the falls were inundated. The town of Kettle Falls, Washington, was relocated.

The Columbia Basin Project has affected habitat ranges for species such as mule deer, pygmy rabbits and burrowing owls, resulting in decreased populations. However, it has created new habitats such as wetlands, and riparian corridors. The environmental impact of the dam effectively ended the traditional way of life of the native inhabitants. The government eventually compensated the Colville Indians in the 1990s with a lump settlement of approximately $53 million, plus annual payments of approximately $15 million. In 2019, a bill was passed to provide additional compensation to the Spokane Tribe. It provides roughly $6 million annually for the first decade, followed by roughly $8 million a year after that.

To compensate for the lack of ladder, three fisheries have been created above the dam, releasing into the upper Columbia River. One half of the fish are reserved for the displaced tribes, and one quarter of the reservoir is reserved for tribal hunting and boating.

== Tourism ==
Built in the late 1970s, the Visitor Center contains many historical photos, geological samples, turbine and dam models, and a theater. The building was designed by Marcel Breuer and resembles a generator rotor. Since May 1989, on summer evenings, the laser light show at Grand Coulee Dam is projected onto the dam's wall. The show includes full-size images of battleships and the Statue of Liberty, as well as some environmental comments. Tours of the Third Power Plant are available to the public and last about an hour. Visitors take a shuttle to view the generators and also travel across the main dam span (otherwise closed to the public) as the formerly used glass elevator is indefinitely out of service.

The headquarters of the Lake Roosevelt National Recreation Area is near the dam, and the lake provides opportunities for fishing, swimming, canoeing, and boating.

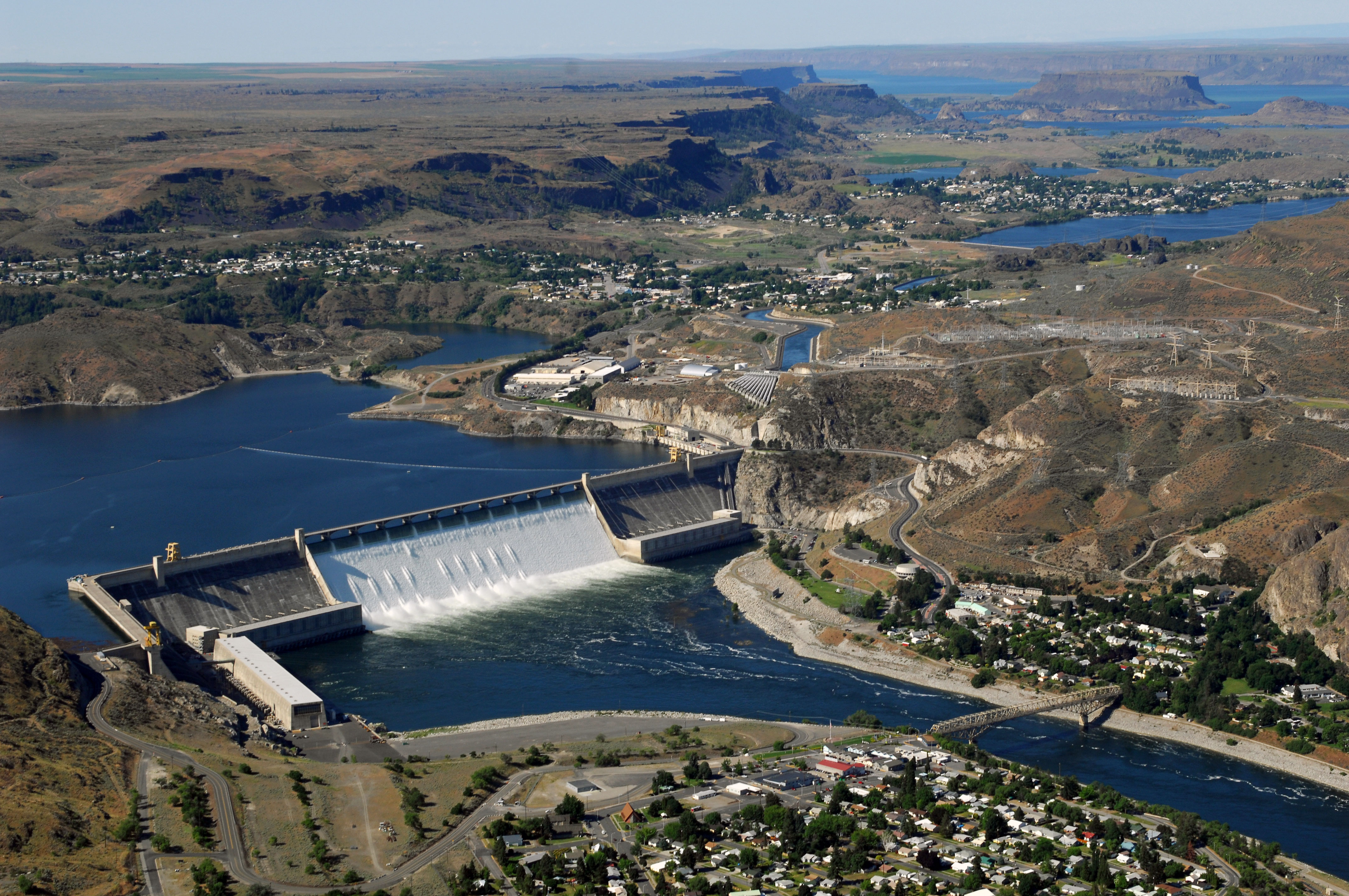

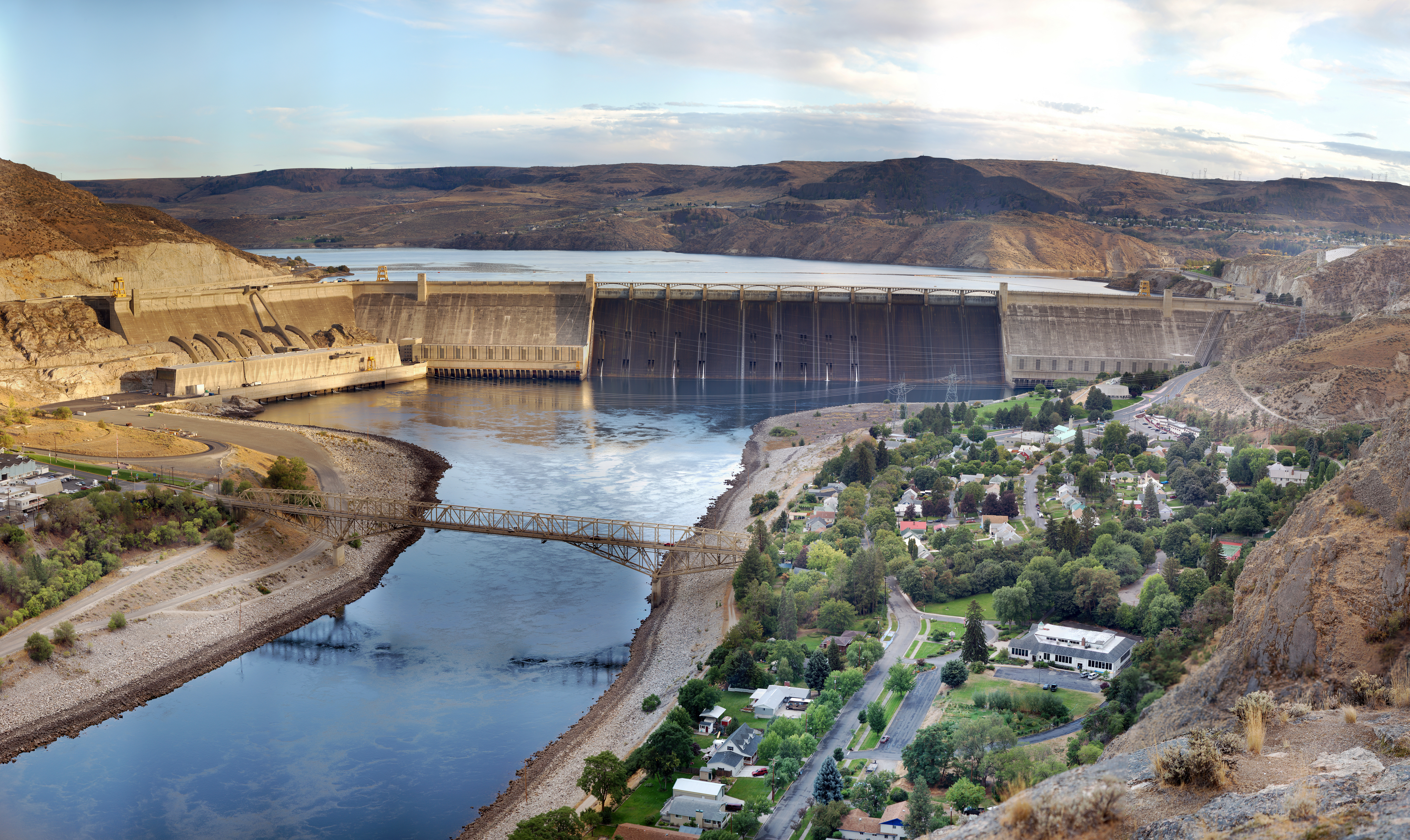
Grand Coulee Dam

== Woody Guthrie connection ==
Video: Guthrie wrote songs for The Columbia about the Columbia River in 1941, but the film wasn't released until 1949. Playing time 21:10.

Folk singer Woody Guthrie wrote some of his most famous songs while working in the area in the 1940s. In 1941, after a brief stay in Los Angeles, Guthrie and his family moved north to Oregon on the promise of a job. Gunther von Fritsch was directing a documentary for the Bonneville Power Administration about the construction of the Grand Coulee Dam on the Columbia River and needed a narrator. Alan Lomax had recommended Guthrie to narrate the film and sing songs onscreen. The original project was expected to take 12 months, but as filmmakers became worried about casting a political figure like Guthrie, they minimized his role. The Department of the Interior hired him for one month to write songs about the Columbia River and the construction of the federal dams for the documentary's soundtrack. Guthrie toured the Columbia River and the Pacific Northwest. Guthrie said he "couldn't believe it, it's a paradise", which appeared to inspire him creatively. In one month, Guthrie wrote 26 songs, including three of his most famous: "Roll On, Columbia, Roll On", "Pastures of Plenty", and "Grand Coulee Dam". The surviving songs were released as Columbia River Songs. Guthrie was paid $266.66 for the month's work in 1941 (ca. $5,750 in 2024 dollars) for the project.

The film Columbia River was completed in 1949 and featured Guthrie's music. Guthrie had been commissioned in 1941 to provide songs for the project, but it had been postponed by WWII.

== See also ==
- John L. Savage – Bureau of Reclamation's chief design engineer during construction.
- List of largest power stations in the world
- List of dams in the Columbia River watershed
- List of largest power stations in the United States
- List of largest hydroelectric power stations in the United States

== General bibliography ==
- Bilington, David P.; Jackson, Donald C.; Melosi, Martin V. (2005), The History of Large Federal Dams: Planning, Design, and Construction (PDF), Washington State: U.S. Department of the Interior, OCLC 248547017, archived from the original (PDF) on February 22, 2012
- Bottenberg, Ray (2008), Images of America:Grand Coulee Dam, Charleston, SC: Arcadia Publishing, ISBN 978-0-7385-5612-3
- Downs, L. Vaugh (1993), The Mightiest of Them All: Memories of Grand Coulee Dam, USA: American Society of Civil Engineers, ISBN 0-87262-935-X
- McKay, Kathryn L.; Renk, Nancy F. (2002), Currents and Undercurrents: An Administrative History of Lake Roosevelt National Recreation Area, Coulee Dam, Washington: Lake Roosevelt Recreation Area, National Park Service, OCLC 361572700
- Ortolano, Leonard; Cushing, Kao (2000), Grand Coulee Dam and the Columbia Basin Project USA (PDF), World Commission on Dams, Annexes, Cape Town, South Africa, OCLC 45147763, archived from the original (PDF) on June 13, 2010
- Pitzer, Paul C. (1994), Grand Coulee: Harnessing a Dream, Pullman, WA: Washington State University, ISBN 0-87422-110-2
- State of Washington (1947), Grand Coulee Dam: Eighth Wonder of the World, Davenport, Washington: Times Publishing Co., OCLC 4961021, archived from the original on June 11, 2011
