= Columbia Basin Project =

American irrigation project

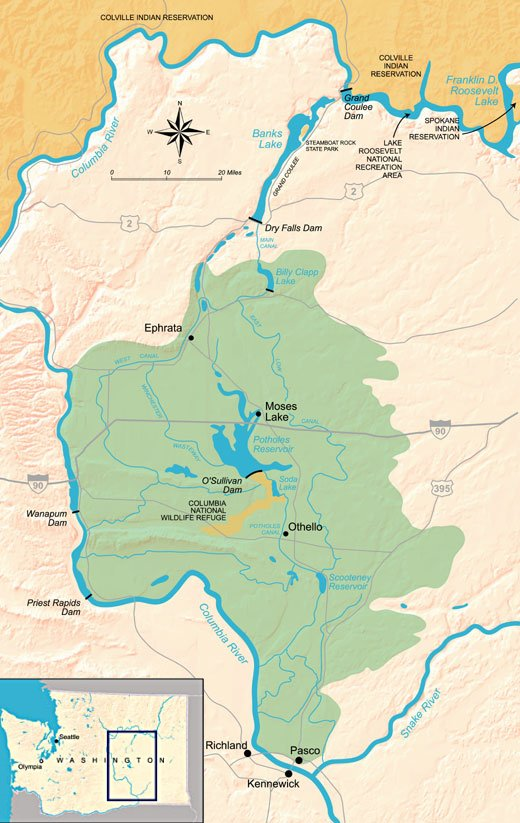
The Columbia Basin Irrigation Project

The Columbia Basin Project (or CBP) in Central Washington, United States, is the irrigation network that the Grand Coulee Dam makes possible. It is the largest water reclamation project in the United States, supplying irrigation water to over 670,000 acres (2,700 km^{2}) of the 1,100,000 acres (4,500 km^{2}) large project area, all of which was originally intended to be supplied and is still classified irrigable and open for the possible enlargement of the system. Water pumped from the Columbia River is carried over 331 miles (533 km) of main canals, stored in a number of reservoirs, then fed into 1,339 miles (2,155 km) of lateral irrigation canals, and out into 3,500 miles (5,600 km) of drains and wasteways. The Grand Coulee Dam, powerplant, and various other parts of the CBP are operated by the Bureau of Reclamation. There are three irrigation districts (the Quincy-Columbia Basin Irrigation District, the East Columbia Basin Irrigation District, and the South Columbia Basin Irrigation District) in the project area, which operate additional local facilities.

== History ==
The U.S. Bureau of Reclamation was created in 1902 to aid development of dry western states. Central Washington's Columbia Plateau was a prime candidate—a desert with fertile loess soil and the Columbia River passing through.

Competing groups lobbied for different irrigation projects; a Spokane group wanted a 134 miles (216 km) gravity flow canal from Lake Pend Oreille while a Wenatchee group (further south) wanted a large dam on the Columbia River, which would pump water up to fill the nearby Grand Coulee, a formerly-dry canyon-like coulee.

After thirteen years of debate, President Franklin D. Roosevelt authorized the dam project with National Industrial Recovery Act money. (It was later specifically authorized by the Rivers and Harbors Act of 1935, and then reauthorized by the Columbia Basin Project Act of 1943 which put it under the Reclamation Project Act of 1939.) Construction of Grand Coulee Dam began in 1933 and was completed in 1942. Its main purpose of pumping water for irrigation was postponed during World War II in favor of electrical power generation that was used for the war effort. Additional hydroelectric generating capacity was added into the 1970s. The Columbia River reservoir behind the dam was named Franklin Delano Roosevelt Lake in honor of the president. The irrigation holding reservoir in Grand Coulee was named Banks Lake.

After World War II the project suffered a number of setbacks. Irrigation water began to arrive between 1948 and 1952, but the costs escalated, resulting in the original plan, in which the people receiving irrigation water would pay back the costs of the project over time, being repeatedly revised and becoming a permanent water subsidy. In addition, the original vision of a social engineering project intended to help farmers settle on small landholdings failed. Farm plots, at first restricted in size, became larger and soon became corporate agribusiness operations.

The original plan was that a federal agency similar to the Tennessee Valley Authority would manage the entire system. Instead, conflicts between the Bureau of Reclamation and the Department of Agriculture thwarted the goal of both agencies of settling the project area with small family farms; larger corporate farms arose instead.

The determination to finish the project's plan to irrigate the full 1,100,000 acres (4,500 km^{2}) waned during the 1960s. The estimated total cost for completing the project had more than doubled between 1940 and 1964, it had become clear that the government's financial investment would not be recovered, and that the benefits of the project were unevenly distributed and increasingly going to larger businesses and corporations. These issues and others dampened enthusiasm for the project, although the exact motives behind the decision to stop construction with the project about half finished are not known.

== Geology ==
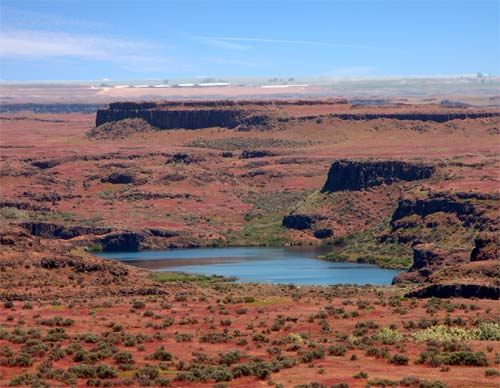
Drumheller Channels, 10 miles (16 km) south of Potholes Reservoir, are examples of channeled scablands

The Columbia Basin in Central Washington is fertile due to its loess soils, but large portions are a near desert, receiving less than ten inches (250 mm) of rain per year. The area is characterized by huge deposits of flood basalt, thousands of feet thick in places, laid down over a period of approximately 11 million years, during the Miocene epoch. These flood basalts are exposed in some places, while in others they are covered with thick layers of loess.

During the last ice age, glaciers shaped the landscape of the Columbia River Plateau. Ice blocked the Columbia River near the north end of Grand Coulee, creating glacial lakes Columbia and Spokane. Ice age glaciers also created Glacial Lake Missoula, in what is now Montana. Erosion allowed glacial Lake Columbia to begin to drain into what became Grand Coulee, which was fully created when glacial Lake Missoula along with glacial Lake Columbia catastrophically emptied. This flood event was one of several known as the Missoula Floods. Unique erosion features, called channeled scablands, are attributed to these floods.

== Component units of the project ==
=== Grand Coulee Dam Complex and Lake Roosevelt ===
- Grand Coulee Dam (1950)
  - Right (north) Powerhouse
  - Left (south) Powerhouse
  - Third Powerhouse (1974) was added as a north wing of the dam from the original Right powerhouse. This addition expanded power generation by 300%.
- Lake Roosevelt
- Grand Coulee Pumping-Generating Plant (1953) consist of twelve pump units with combined power of 593 MW (795,000 hp), of which six are reversible pump-generator turbine units with a combined generating capacity of 314 MW (421,000 hp). The pumps are used to move water from Lake Roosevelt into Banks Lake, from which it can be either sent south into the Columbia Basin Irrigation system or returned to Lake Roosevelt by the reversible generating pump-turbines to create additional electricity for the grid.

=== Feeder Canal, North and Dry Falls Dams, Banks Lake ===
- Banks Lake (1951) is an artificial impoundment in the Upper Grand Coulee. It is 27 miles (43 km) long and 1 to 3 miles (1.6 to 4.8 km) wide. The coulee has nearly vertical rock walls up to 600 feet (180 m) high.
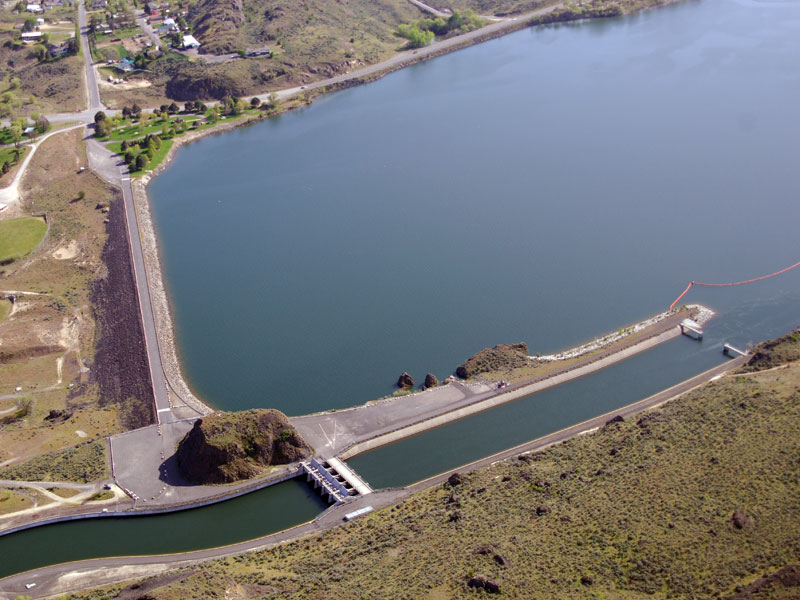
  North Dam on Banks Lake with Feeder Canal
  - North Dam, near the town of Grand Coulee, has a maximum height of 145 feet (44 m) and a crest length of 1,400 feet (430 m).
  - Dry Falls, or South Dam, near Coulee City, has a maximum height of 123 feet (37 m) and a crest length of 8,880 feet (2,710 m). The crest elevation of both dams is 1,580 feet (480 m). Project water enters Banks Lake through the Feeder Canal from the Pump-generating plant. The outlet for Banks Lake is the Main Canal near Coulee City. It is near the east abutment of Dry Falls Dam. Banks Lake serves as an equalizing reservoir for storage of water for irrigation and can be used to for power generation.
- Feeder Canal (1951) links North Dam at northern end of Banks Lake with the siphon outlets for the Grand Coulee Pumping—Generating plants discharge lines. It is 1.6 miles (2.6 km) long running in an open concrete-lined canal, and a twin-barrel concrete cut—and-cover conduit.
- Main Canal (1951) is 8.3 miles (13.4 km), including 2.4 miles (3.9 km) of lake sections.
- Bacon Tunnel and Siphon (1950) is a 1,037.5 feet (316.2 m) long sealed Siphon under the eastern extension of the Dry Falls draw.
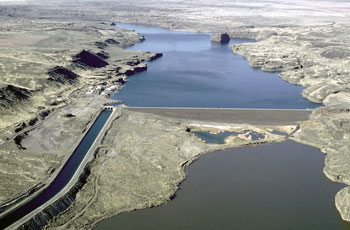
  Aerial view of Pinto Dam, Washington, USA.
- Billy Clapp Lake (Pinto Dam – zoned earth & rockfill) (1951) a.k.a. (Long Lake Dam) is at the south end of Long Lake Coulee. The reservoir is 6 miles (9.7 km) long and 0.5 miles (0.80 km) wide.
- Potholes Reservoir

== Irrigation ==
When it was built, Grand Coulee Dam was the largest dam in the world, but it was only part of the irrigation project. Additional dams were built at the north and south ends of Grand Coulee, the dry canyon south of Grand Coulee Dam, allowing the coulee to be filled with water pumped up from the Columbia River. The resulting reservoir, called Banks Lake, is about 30 miles (48 km) long. Banks Lake serves as the CBP's initial storage reservoir. Additional canals, siphons, and reservoirs were built south of Bank Lake, reaching over 100 miles (160 km). Water is lifted 280 feet (85 m) from Lake Roosevelt to feed the massive network.

The total amount of the Columbia flow that is diverted into the CBP at Grand Coulee varies a little from year to year, and is currently about 3.0 million acre-feet. This is about 3.8 percent of the Columbia's average flow as measured at the Grand Coulee dam. This amount is larger than the combined annual flows of the nearby Yakima, Wenatchee, and Okanogan rivers. There were plans to double the area of irrigated land, according to tour guides at the dam, over the next several decades. However, the Bureau of Reclamation website states that no further development is anticipated, with 671,000 acres (2,720 km^{2}) irrigated out of the original 1,100,000 acres (4,500 km^{2}) planned.

Interest in completing the Columbia Basin Project's 1,100,000 acres (4,500 km^{2}) has grown in the late 20th and early 21st centuries. One reason for the renewed interest is the substantial depletion of the Odessa aquifer. Agricultural operations within the CBP's boundaries but outside the developed portion have for decades used groundwater pumped from the Odessa aquifer to irrigate crops.

== Hydroelectric power ==
Hydroelectricity was not the primary goal of the project, but during World War II the demand for electricity in the region boomed. The Hanford nuclear reservation was built just south of the project and aluminum smelting plants flocked to the Columbia Basin. A new power house was built at the Grand Coulee Dam, starting in the late sixties, that tripled the generating capacity. Part of the dam had to be blown up and re-built to make way for the new generators. Electricity is now transmitted to Canada and as far south as San Diego.

== Environmental impact ==
One environmental impact has been the reduction in native fish stocks above the dams. The majority of fish in the Columbia basin are migratory fish like salmon, sturgeon and steelhead. These migratory fish are often harmed or unable to pass through the narrow passages and turbines at dams. In addition to the physical barriers the dams pose, the slowing speed and altered course of the river raises temperatures, alters oxygen content, and changes river bed conditions. These altered conditions can stress and potentially kill both migratory and local non-migratory organisms in the river. The decimation of these migratory fish stocks above Grand Coulee Dam would not allow the former fishing lifestyle of Native Americans of the area, who once depended on the salmon for a way of life.

The environmental impacts of the Columbia Basin Project have made it a contentious and often politicized issue. A common argument for not implementing environmental safeguards at dam sites is that post-construction modifications would likely have to be significant. Tour guides at the Grand Coulee dam site, for example, indicate that a "fish ladder might have to be 5 miles (8.0 km) long to get the fish up the 550 feet (170 m) needed, and many fish would die before reaching the upper end" thus no fish ladders were built. Advocates of remedial measures point out that such steps would still be better than the status quo, which has led to marked die-offs and the likely extinction of several types of salmon.

There are a number of issues regarding the runoff of irrigation water. The project region receives about 6 to 10 inches (250 mm) of annual rainfall, while the application of irrigation water amounts to an equivalent 40 to 50 inches (1,300 mm). The original plans did not sufficiently address the inevitable seepage and runoff. In some cases the results are beneficial. For example, numerous new lakes provide recreation opportunities and habitat for fish and game. In other cases agricultural chemicals in the runoff cause pollution.

== Economic benefits and costs ==
The irrigation water provided by this project greatly benefits the agricultural production of the area. North Central Washington is one of the largest and most productive tree fruit producing areas on the planet. Without Coulee Dam and the greater Columbia Basin Project, much of North Central Washington State would be too arid for cultivation.

According to the federal Bureau of Reclamation the yearly value of the Columbia Basin Project is $630 million in irrigated crops, $950 million in power production, $20 million in flood damage prevention, and $50 million in recreation. The project itself involves costs that are difficult to determine. The farms that receive irrigation water must pay for it, but due to insufficient data from the Bureau of Reclamation, it is not possible to compare the total cost paid by the Bureau to the payments received. Nevertheless, the farm payments account for only a small fraction of the total cost to the government, resulting in the project's agricultural corporations receiving a large water subsidy from the government. Critics describe the CBP as a classical example of federal money being used to subsidize a relatively small group of farmers in the American West in places where it would never be economically viable under other circumstances.

== See also ==
- Tributaries of the Columbia River
- Cities on the Columbia River
- Hydroelectric dams on the Columbia River
- Columbia Basin Initiative
