= Banks Lake =

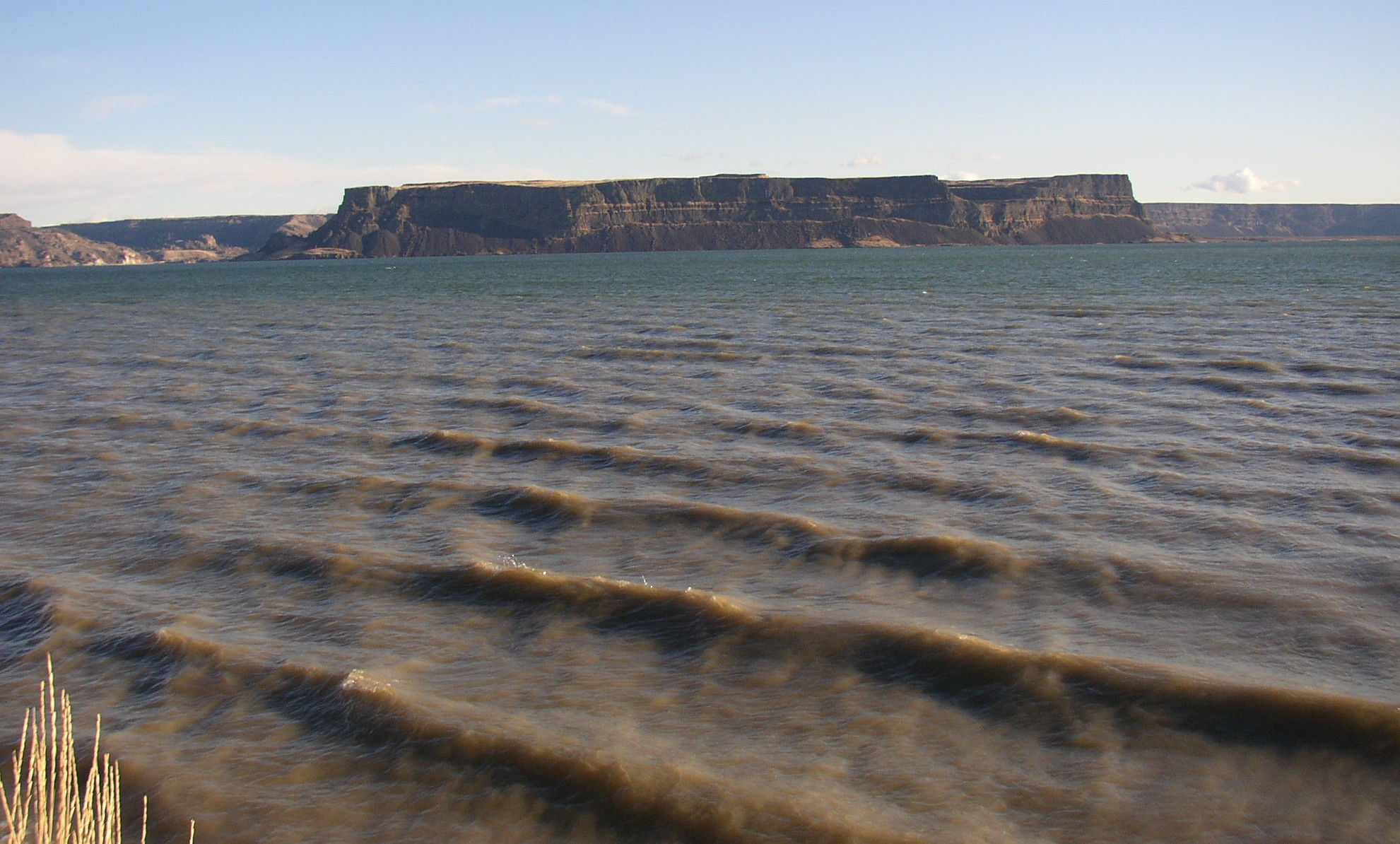

- Location within Washington (state) Location within the United States
- Location: Grant / Douglas counties, Washington, United States
- Coordinates: 47°37′12″N 119°18′27″W
- Type: reservoir
- Basin countries: United States
- Max. length: 31 mi (50 km)
- Surface area: 26,886 acres (10,880 ha) (42 mi^{2})
- Average depth: 46 ft (14 m)
- Max. depth: 177 ft (54 m)
- Water volume: 1,237,000 acre-feet (1.526×10^{9} m^{3})
- Shore length^{1}: 135 mi (217 km)
- Surface elevation: 1,571 ft (479 m)
- ^{1} Shore length is not a well-defined measure.

Banks Lake is a 27-mile-long (43 km) reservoir in central Washington in the United States.

Part of the Columbia Basin Project, Banks Lake occupies the northern portion of the Grand Coulee, a formerly dry coulee near the Columbia River, formed by the Missoula Floods during the Pleistocene epoch. Grand Coulee Dam, built by the United States Bureau of Reclamation on the Columbia River created Franklin D. Roosevelt Lake, the reservoir on the river behind the dam. The surface of Lake Roosevelt is several hundred feet above the original Columbia River, making it easier to pump water 280 feet (85 m) up and out of the river's canyon into the adjacent Grand Coulee. Two low earth-fill dams, Dry Falls Dam and North Dam, keep the water in the Grand Coulee, thus creating the reservoir named Banks Lake. It is named after Frank A. Banks, the construction supervisor at Grand Coulee Dam.

At the north end of Banks Lake the city of Grand Coulee and the town of Electric City are located. Steamboat Rock State Park is in the north-central portion. The town of Coulee City is at the south end of the lake. From the south end, the water stored in Banks Lake is distributed over a large region for irrigation of the Columbia Basin Project.

The area surrounding Banks Lake includes hills and farmland that uses center-pivot irrigation.

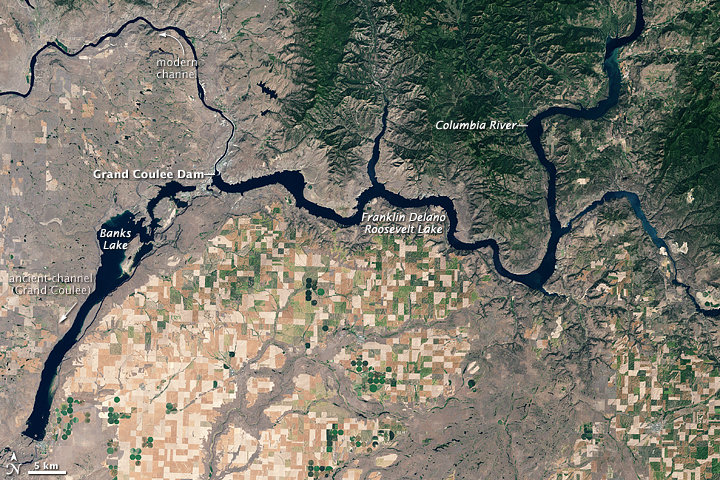
Aerial photograph of Banks Lake, Grand Coulee Dam, and Franklin D. Roosevelt Lake taken in 1999 by Landsat
