= 1999 Canadian Junior Curling Championships =

The 1999 Kärcher Canadian Junior Curling Championships were held February 6–14 at the Kelowna Curling Club in Kelowna, British Columbia. The winning teams represented Canada at the 1999 World Junior Curling Championships.

== Men's ==
=== Teams ===
Province / Territory	Skip	Third	Second	Lead
British Columbia	Jeff Richard	Kevin Folk	Tyler Orme	Chris Anderson
Alberta	Jeff Erickson	Marc Kennedy	Kevin Skarban	Kevin McNee
Saskatchewan	Steven Scott	Jason Ackerman	Derek Owens	Todd Bakken
Manitoba	Sean Grassie	Scott Madams	Ron Tomyk	Scott Grassie
Northern Ontario	Joe Scharf	Robin Champagne	Colin Koivula	Mike McCarville
Yukon	Josh Clark	Jessi Birnie	Mike Nohr	Bob Colberg
Northwest Territories	Trevor Hoffman	Steven Rosendahl	David Dewar	Brett Hoffman
Ontario	John Morris	Craig Savill	Jason Young	Brent Laing
Quebec	Graeme Robertson	Kevin LeCouffe	Michael LeCouffe	Jarrett Quinn
New Brunswick	Rob Heffernan	Paul Dobson	Geoff Porter	Kevin Tippett
Prince Edward Island	Rodney Hood	Darren Higgins	Hugh Fidler	Jamie Newson
Nova Scotia	Justin Grundy	Mike Bardsley	Matt Moreira	Jeff Moreira
Newfoundland	Brad Gushue	Mark Nichols	Neal Blackmore	Steve Parsons

=== Standings ===
Locale	Skip	W	L
British Columbia	Jeff Richard	10	2
Newfoundland	Brad Gushue	8	4
Ontario	John Morris	8	4
Alberta	Jeff Erickson	8	4
Northern Ontario	Joe Scharf	7	5
New Brunswick	Rob Heffernan	7	5
Quebec	Graeme Robertson	7	5
Prince Edward Island	Jamie Newson	6	6
Manitoba	Sean Grassie	6	6
Saskatchewan	Steven Scott	5	7
Nova Scotia	Justin Grundy	4	8
Yukon	Josh Clark	2	10
Northwest Territories	Trevor Hoffman	0	12

=== Results ===
==== Draw 1 ====
Sheet A	1	2	3	4	5	6	7	8	9	10	Final
Yukon (Clark)	0	2	0	0	0	0	1	0	0	X	3
Saskatchewan (Scott)	2	0	1	0	0	1	0	0	4	X	8

Sheet C	1	2	3	4	5	6	7	8	9	10	Final
Nova Scotia (Grundy)	0	1	0	0	0	0	1	0	0	X	2
Newfoundland (Gushue)	2	0	2	1	1	1	0	1	0	X	8

Sheet E	1	2	3	4	5	6	7	8	9	10	Final
Alberta (Erickson)	3	0	2	2	0	0	0	3	X	X	10
Northwest Territories (Hoffman)	0	1	0	0	1	1	0	0	X	X	3

Sheet G	1	2	3	4	5	6	7	8	9	10	11	Final
Northern Ontario (Scharf)	1	0	0	2	1	0	1	0	0	2	0	7
Manitoba (Grassie)	0	2	0	0	0	2	0	2	1	0	1	8

Sheet I	1	2	3	4	5	6	7	8	9	10	Final
Ontario (Morris)	1	0	2	0	0	0	2	1	0	0	6
Quebec (Robertson)	0	1	0	0	4	1	0	0	0	1	7

Sheet K	1	2	3	4	5	6	7	8	9	10	Final
New Brunswick (Heffernan)	1	0	0	1	0	1	0	0	X	X	3
Prince Edward Island (Newson)	0	0	1	0	1	0	3	3	X	X	8

==== Draw 2 ====
Sheet B	1	2	3	4	5	6	7	8	9	10	Final
Nova Scotia (Grundy)	3	0	0	0	0	2	0	0	0	3	8
Manitoba (Grassie)	0	2	0	0	1	0	0	3	0	0	6

Sheet D	1	2	3	4	5	6	7	8	9	10	Final
Northern Ontario (Scharf)	0	2	0	0	1	0	1	0	0	2	6
British Columbia (Richard)	1	0	1	0	0	1	0	1	0	0	4

Sheet F	1	2	3	4	5	6	7	8	9	10	Final
Quebec (Robertson)	0	1	0	0	2	0	0	0	1	0	4
New Brunswick (Heffernan)	1	0	1	1	0	0	1	1	0	1	6

Sheet H	1	2	3	4	5	6	7	8	9	10	Final
Northwest Territories (Hoffman)	0	0	0	0	0	X	X	X	X	X	0
Prince Edward Island (Newson)	2	3	2	1	1	X	X	X	X	X	9

Sheet J	1	2	3	4	5	6	7	8	9	10	Final
Newfoundland (Gushue)	1	0	0	1	1	0	0	1	1	1	6
Saskatchewan (Scott)	0	1	0	0	0	1	2	0	0	0	4

Sheet L	1	2	3	4	5	6	7	8	9	10	Final
Ontario (Morris)	0	2	0	0	1	0	2	0	3	X	8
Yukon (Clark)	0	0	0	2	0	3	0	1	0	X	6

==== Draw 3 ====
Sheet A	1	2	3	4	5	6	7	8	9	10	Final
Prince Edward Island (Newson)	3	0	1	0	0	1	0	0	2	0	7
British Columbia (Richard)	0	2	0	1	1	0	0	2	0	3	9

Sheet C	1	2	3	4	5	6	7	8	9	10	Final
Manitoba (Grassie)	0	1	0	3	0	1	0	1	0	0	6
Alberta (Erickson)	0	0	3	0	2	0	1	0	0	1	7

Sheet E	1	2	3	4	5	6	7	8	9	10	11	Final
Nova Scotia (Grundy)	1	0	0	2	0	0	1	0	0	1	0	5
Ontario (Morris)	0	1	0	0	0	2	0	1	1	0	1	6

Sheet G	1	2	3	4	5	6	7	8	9	10	Final
Saskatchewan (Scott)	0	2	1	0	0	0	0	1	0	X	4
Quebec (Robertson)	0	0	0	2	0	3	0	0	3	X	8

Sheet I	1	2	3	4	5	6	7	8	9	10	Final
Yukon (Clark)	1	0	2	0	4	0	2	0	0	X	9
Northwest Territories (Hoffman)	0	1	0	2	0	2	0	1	0	X	6

Sheet K	1	2	3	4	5	6	7	8	9	10	Final
Newfoundland (Gushue)	1	0	0	0	2	0	0	0	2	0	5
Northern Ontario (Scharf)	0	0	1	1	0	2	1	1	0	0	6

==== Draw 4 ====
Sheet B	1	2	3	4	5	6	7	8	9	10	11	Final
Quebec (Robertson)	1	0	0	0	3	1	1	0	2	0	1	9
Northwest Territories (Hoffman)	0	1	0	3	0	0	0	3	0	1	0	8

Sheet C	1	2	3	4	5	6	7	8	9	10	11	Final
New Brunswick (Heffernan)	0	0	1	0	2	0	1	0	0	1	0	5
Saskatchewan (Scott)	0	0	0	2	0	2	0	0	1	0	1	6

Sheet E	1	2	3	4	5	6	7	8	9	10	Final
Manitoba (Grassie)	2	0	1	1	0	4	0	2	X	X	10
Yukon (Clark)	0	0	0	0	2	0	1	0	X	X	3

Sheet H	1	2	3	4	5	6	7	8	9	10	Final
Northern Ontario (Scharf)	1	0	3	0	0	0	0	2	0	X	6
Nova Scotia (Grandy)	0	1	0	1	0	0	0	0	1	X	3

Sheet J	1	2	3	4	5	6	7	8	9	10	Final
Alberta (Erickson)	3	0	0	0	0	0	1	0	2	X	6
Prince Edward Island (Newson)	0	1	0	0	0	1	0	1	0	X	3

Sheet K	1	2	3	4	5	6	7	8	9	10	Final
British Columbia (Richard)	0	2	1	0	2	0	0	2	0	0	7
Ontario (Morris)	0	0	0	1	0	1	1	0	2	1	6

==== Draw 5 ====
Sheet A	1	2	3	4	5	6	7	8	9	10	Final
Alberta (Erickson)	1	0	1	0	0	2	0	1	0	4	9
Northern Ontario (Scharf)	0	1	0	0	1	0	2	0	2	0	6

Sheet C	1	2	3	4	5	6	7	8	9	10	Final
Ontario (Morris)	2	3	0	3	1	X	X	X	X	X	9
Northwest Territories (Hoffman)	0	0	1	0	0	X	X	X	X	X	1

Sheet E	1	2	3	4	5	6	7	8	9	10	11	Final
Saskatchewan (Scott)	0	0	0	1	0	0	1	2	0	1	0	5
British Columbia (Richard)	0	1	1	0	1	1	0	0	1	0	1	6

Sheet G	1	2	3	4	5	6	7	8	9	10	Final
Prince Edward Island (Newson)	0	0	0	2	0	1	0	0	X	X	3
Yukon (Clark)	0	0	3	0	1	0	1	3	X	X	8

Sheet I	1	2	3	4	5	6	7	8	9	10	Final
Newfoundland (Gushue)	1	0	2	1	0	0	2	0	1	X	7
Manitoba (Grassie)	0	2	0	0	2	1	0	0	0	X	5

Sheet L	1	2	3	4	5	6	7	8	9	10	Final
New Brunswick (Heffernan)	1	0	2	0	1	0	0	1	0	2	7
Nova Scotia (Grundy)	0	1	0	2	0	1	1	0	1	0	6

==== Draw 6 ====
Sheet B	1	2	3	4	5	6	7	8	9	10	Final
Ontario (Morris)	0	2	0	3	0	1	0	2	1	X	9
Prince Edward Island (Newson)	0	0	2	0	2	0	1	0	0	X	5

Sheet D	1	2	3	4	5	6	7	8	9	10	Final
Yukon (Clark)	1	0	0	1	0	1	0	2	0	X	5
Newfoundland (Gushue)	0	1	0	0	1	0	4	0	5	X	11

Sheet E	1	2	3	4	5	6	7	8	9	10	Final
Northwest Territories (Hoffman)	1	1	0	0	0	0	0	0	1	X	3
New Brunswick (Heffernan)	0	0	0	2	0	1	2	0	0	X	5

Sheet H	1	2	3	4	5	6	7	8	9	10	Final
British Columbia (Richard)	2	0	1	1	0	2	0	0	1	X	7
Quebec (Robertson)	0	0	0	0	3	0	1	1	0	X	5

Sheet I	1	2	3	4	5	6	7	8	9	10	Final
Nova Scotia (Grundy)	0	2	0	1	1	0	0	0	1	X	5
Alberta (Erickson)	1	0	0	0	0	3	4	0	0	X	8

Sheet L	1	2	3	4	5	6	7	8	9	10	Final
Northern Ontario (Scharf)	2	0	1	0	0	0	1	0	2	0	6
Saskatchewan (Scott)	0	1	0	1	1	1	0	2	0	1	7

==== Draw 7 ====
Sheet A	1	2	3	4	5	6	7	8	9	10	Final
Yukon (Clark)	0	0	2	0	0	0	1	0	X	X	3
Nova Scotia (Grundy)	1	1	0	1	2	1	0	3	X	X	9

Sheet D	1	2	3	4	5	6	7	8	9	10	Final
Saskatchewan (Scott)	1	0	1	0	1	0	2	0	1	0	6
Alberta (Erickson)	0	1	0	1	0	2	0	2	0	1	7

Sheet E	1	2	3	4	5	6	7	8	9	10	11	Final
Quebec (Robertson)	0	1	0	2	0	0	0	2	0	0	0	5
Northern Ontario (Scharf)	0	0	1	0	2	2	0	0	0	0	1	6

Sheet G	1	2	3	4	5	6	7	8	9	10	Final
Newfoundland (Gushue)	3	2	3	0	X	X	X	X	X	X	8
Northwest Territories (Hoffman)	0	0	0	1	X	X	X	X	X	X	1

Sheet I	1	2	3	4	5	6	7	8	9	10	Final
British Columbia (Richard)	2	0	0	1	0	1	0	1	1	0	6
New Brunswick (Heffernan)	0	2	1	0	1	0	1	0	0	2	7

Sheet L	1	2	3	4	5	6	7	8	9	10	11	Final
Prince Edward Island (Newson)	2	1	0	2	1	0	0	2	0	0	1	9
Manitoba (Grassie)	0	0	1	0	0	3	1	0	2	1	0	8

==== Draw 8 ====
Sheet B	1	2	3	4	5	6	7	8	9	10	Final
Northwest Territories (Hoffman)	1	0	0	0	0	2	0	X	X	X	3
British Columbia (Richard)	0	2	1	4	3	0	1	X	X	X	11

Sheet C	1	2	3	4	5	6	7	8	9	10	Final
Prince Edward Island (Newson)	1	0	2	1	1	1	0	0	3	X	9
Northern Ontario (Scharf)	0	2	0	0	0	0	3	0	0	X	5

Sheet F	1	2	3	4	5	6	7	8	9	10	Final
Saskatchewan (Scott)	1	0	0	2	0	0	2	1	0	0	6
Nova Scotia (Grundy)	0	2	1	0	2	2	0	0	0	0	7

Sheet H	1	2	3	4	5	6	7	8	9	10	Final
New Brunswick (Heffernan)	0	1	0	2	0	1	0	0	0	X	4
Ontario (Morris)	1	0	1	0	2	0	2	0	2	X	8

Sheet J	1	2	3	4	5	6	7	8	9	10	Final
Manitoba (Grassie)	2	1	2	1	0	0	0	1	0	1	8
Quebec (Robertson)	0	0	0	0	3	1	1	0	1	0	6

Sheet L	1	2	3	4	5	6	7	8	9	10	Final
Alberta (Erickson)	0	0	1	0	1	0	0	0	1	X	3
Newfoundland (Gushue)	0	0	0	2	0	1	2	2	0	X	7

==== Draw 9 ====
Sheet A	1	2	3	4	5	6	7	8	9	10	Final
Quebec (Robertson)	0	1	0	0	3	0	0	0	0	2	6
Newfoundland (Gushue)	0	0	2	0	0	1	0	1	0	0	4

Sheet D	1	2	3	4	5	6	7	8	9	10	Final
Northwest Territories (Hoffman)	0	0	0	0	0	1	0	1	0	X	2
Nova Scotia (Grundy)	0	0	2	0	2	0	2	0	2	X	8

Sheet F	1	2	3	4	5	6	7	8	9	10	11	Final
British Columbia (Richard)	0	0	0	0	0	0	2	0	0	1	1	4
Alberta (Erickson)	0	0	0	0	1	0	0	0	2	0	0	3

Sheet H	1	2	3	4	5	6	7	8	9	10	Final
Manitoba (Grassie)	2	0	0	1	1	1	0	2	0	X	7
Saskatchewan (Scott)	0	2	0	0	0	0	1	0	1	X	4

Sheet J	1	2	3	4	5	6	7	8	9	10	Final
Northern Ontario (Scharf)	1	0	1	0	1	1	0	1	0	X	5
Ontario (Morris)	0	2	0	2	0	0	2	0	0	X	6

Sheet K	1	2	3	4	5	6	7	8	9	10	Final
New Brunswick (Heffernan)	2	0	4	0	2	3	X	X	X	X	11
Yukon (Clark)	0	1	0	2	0	0	X	X	X	X	3

==== Draw 10 ====
Sheet A	1	2	3	4	5	6	7	8	9	10	Final
Ontario (Morris)	2	0	0	0	1	0	0	0	0	X	3
Alberta (Erickson)	0	0	1	0	0	0	1	0	0	X	2

Sheet D	1	2	3	4	5	6	7	8	9	10	11	Final
British Columbia (Richard)	4	0	0	1	0	1	0	0	1	0	1	8
Manitoba (Grassie)	0	3	0	0	1	0	1	0	0	2	0	7

Sheet F	1	2	3	4	5	6	7	8	9	10	Final
Newfoundland (Gushue)	1	0	0	1	0	0	2	0	X	X	4
New Brunswick (Heffernan)	0	3	1	0	1	1	0	3	X	X	9

Sheet G	1	2	3	4	5	6	7	8	9	10	Final
Yukon (Clark)	3	0	1	0	1	1	0	0	0	0	6
Quebec (Robertson)	0	0	0	2	0	0	2	1	0	2	7

Sheet J	1	2	3	4	5	6	7	8	9	10	Final
Saskatchewan (Scott)	1	1	1	0	2	0	0	3	0	X	8
Northwest Territories (Hoffman)	0	0	0	1	0	2	1	0	2	X	6

Sheet K	1	2	3	4	5	6	7	8	9	10	Final
Nova Scotia (Grundy)	0	0	2	0	0	0	0	0	X	X	2
Prince Edward Island (Newson)	1	0	0	0	5	2	0	2	X	X	10

==== Draw 11 ====
Sheet A	1	2	3	4	5	6	7	8	9	10	Final
Northwest Territories (Hoffman)	0	0	0	0	0	1	X	X	X	X	1
Manitoba (Grassie)	1	2	2	1	2	0	X	X	X	X	8

Sheet C	1	2	3	4	5	6	7	8	9	10	Final
Alberta (Erickson)	0	1	0	4	1	0	0	1	0	X	7
Yukon (Clark)	2	0	1	0	0	0	2	0	1	X	6

Sheet F	1	2	3	4	5	6	7	8	9	10	Final
Prince Edward Island (Newson)	2	0	0	0	2	0	0	0	X	X	4
Quebec (Robertson)	0	1	2	1	0	0	5	1	X	X	10

Sheet G	1	2	3	4	5	6	7	8	9	10	Final
New Brunswick (Heffernan)	0	0	0	1	0	2	0	0	0	X	3
Northern Ontario (Scharf)	0	0	0	0	1	0	2	2	1	X	6

Sheet J	1	2	3	4	5	6	7	8	9	10	Final
Nova Scotia (Grundy)	0	0	0	0	1	0	2	0	1	X	4
British Columbia (Richard)	1	1	0	1	0	2	0	3	0	X	8

Sheet K	1	2	3	4	5	6	7	8	9	10	Final
Ontario (Morris)	2	0	0	0	0	0	1	0	0	X	3
Newfoundland (Gushue)	0	1	0	0	2	1	0	1	3	X	8

==== Draw 12 ====
Sheet B	1	2	3	4	5	6	7	8	9	10	Final
Yukon (Clark)	0	2	0	0	0	0	0	0	X	X	2
British Columbia (Richard)	1	0	0	2	1	0	1	1	X	X	6

Sheet C	1	2	3	4	5	6	7	8	9	10	Final
Newfoundland (Gushue)	0	3	0	2	0	1	0	1	0	2	9
Prince Edward Island (Newson)	0	0	3	0	2	0	1	0	2	0	8

Sheet F	1	2	3	4	5	6	7	8	9	10	Final
Northwest Territories (Hoffman)	1	0	0	0	0	2	0	0	1	X	4
Northern Ontario (Scharf)	0	1	1	2	1	0	2	1	0	X	8

Sheet G	1	2	3	4	5	6	7	8	9	10	Final
Saskatchewan (Scott)	0	1	0	0	2	1	0	0	0	2	6
Ontario (Morris)	0	0	1	2	0	0	2	0	0	0	5

Sheet I	1	2	3	4	5	6	7	8	9	10	Final
Manitoba (Grassie)	2	0	1	0	0	2	1	0	2	X	8
New Brunswick (Heffernan)	0	1	0	0	1	0	0	1	0	X	3

Sheet K	1	2	3	4	5	6	7	8	9	10	Final
Quebec (Robertson)	0	0	0	0	0	0	1	0	1	0	2
Alberta (Erickson)	0	0	1	0	1	0	0	1	0	1	4

==== Draw 13 ====
Sheet B	1	2	3	4	5	6	7	8	9	10	Final
Alberta (Erickson)	0	0	0	1	0	0	3	0	0	X	4
New Brunswick (Heffernan)	0	0	1	0	2	1	0	2	2	X	8

Sheet C	1	2	3	4	5	6	7	8	9	10	Final
Quebec (Robertson)	0	0	0	0	0	0	0	1	2	X	3
Nova Scotia (Grundy)	0	0	0	0	0	0	1	0	0	X	1

Sheet F	1	2	3	4	5	6	7	8	9	10	Final
Manitoba (Grassie)	0	0	0	2	0	0	1	0	X	X	3
Ontario (Morris)	0	2	1	0	3	1	0	3	X	X	10

Sheet H	1	2	3	4	5	6	7	8	9	10	Final
British Columbia (Richard)	0	1	0	0	0	0	2	0	1	1	5
Newfoundland (Gushue)	0	0	0	0	0	1	0	2	0	0	3

Sheet I	1	2	3	4	5	6	7	8	9	10	Final
Prince Edward Island (Newson)	3	0	0	0	2	0	2	0	2	X	9
Saskatchewan (Scott)	0	1	1	1	0	1	0	1	0	X	5

Sheet L	1	2	3	4	5	6	7	8	9	10	Final
Northern Ontario (Scharf)	5	0	3	1	1	X	X	X	X	X	10
Yukon (Clark)	0	1	0	0	0	X	X	X	X	X	1

=== Playoffs ===
Tiebreaker		Semifinal		Final
Alberta	5
Ontario	6	Newfoundland	3
		Ontario	5
				Ontario	7
				British Columbia	3

==== Tiebreaker ====
Sheet H	1	2	3	4	5	6	7	8	9	10	11	Final
Alberta (Erickson)	0	0	0	1	1	0	0	0	2	1	0	5
Ontario (Morris)	1	1	0	0	0	0	0	3	0	0	1	6

Player percentages
Alberta		Ontario	
Kevin McNee	91%	Brent Laing	86%
Kevin Skarban	82%	Jason Young	91%
Marc Kennedy	82%	Craig Savill	74%
Jeff Erickson	78%	John Morris	74%
Total	83%	Total	81%

==== Semifinal ====
Sheet I	1	2	3	4	5	6	7	8	9	10	11	Final
Newfoundland (Gushue)	0	0	0	0	1	0	0	0	0	2	0	3
Ontario (Morris)	0	0	2	0	0	0	1	0	0	0	2	5

Player percentages
Newfoundland		Ontario	
Steve Parsons	70%	Brent Laing	92%
Neal Blackmore	76%	Jason Young	84%
Mark Nichols	70%	Craig Savill	80%
Brad Gushue	88%	John Morris	95%
Total	76%	Total	88%

==== Final ====
Sheet E	1	2	3	4	5	6	7	8	9	10	Final
Ontario (Morris)	0	1	0	0	2	0	3	1	0	X	7
British Columbia (Richard)	0	0	1	1	0	1	0	0	0	X	3

Player percentages
Ontario		British Columbia	
Brent Laing	77%	Chris Anderson	83%
Jason Young	89%	Tyler Orme	76%
Craig Savill	78%	Kevin Folk	76%
John Morris	86%	Jeff Richard	69%
Total	82%	Total	76%

== Women's ==
=== Teams ===
Province / Territory	Skip	Third	Second	Lead
British Columbia	Nadia Zbeetnoff	Barb Zbeetnoff (skip)	Kristen Recksiedler	Mila Hockley
Alberta	Kyla MacLachlan	Chantel Paradis	Sara Gartner	Lyndsay Wegmann
Saskatchewan	Stefanie Miller	Marliese Miller	Stacy Helm	Kristin Regnier
Manitoba	Kristy Jenion	Raegan Wilkie	Charmaine Froese	Kyla Denisuik
Northern Ontario	Angela Lee	Lisa Bolen	Danielle Shrumm	Sarah Boily
Yukon	Nicole Baldwin	Jaime Milward	Hailey Birnie	Jaime Hewitt
Northwest Territories	Jill Kelln	Krista Vivian	Tasha Riffel	Meagan Crawley
Ontario	Julie Reddick	Karen Vachon	Leigh Armstrong	Stephanie Leachman
Quebec	Marie-France Larouche	Nancy Belanger	Marie-Eve Letourneau	Valérie Grenier
New Brunswick	Sylvie Robichaud	Marcia Chiasson	Nicole Arsenault	Marie Richard
Prince Edward Island	Suzanne Gaudet	Stefanie Richard	Stephanie Pickett	Kelly Higgins
Nova Scotia	Meredith Doyle	Beth Roach	Krista Normore	Kelly MacIntosh
Newfoundland	Laura Strong	Cindy Miller	Kim Conway	Beth Hamilton

=== Standings ===
Locale	Skip	W	L
Nova Scotia	Meredith Doyle	9	3
Quebec	Marie-France Larouche	9	3
Saskatchewan	Stefanie Miller	9	3
Ontario	Julie Reddick	8	4
Manitoba	Kristy Jenion	7	5
New Brunswick	Sylvie Robichaud	6	6
Prince Edward Island	Suzanne Gaudet	6	6
Yukon	Nicole Baldwin	6	6
Alberta	Kyla MacLachlan	5	7
British Columbia	Nadia Zbeetnoff	5	7
Northwest Territories	Jill Kelln	3	9
Northern Ontario	Angela Lee	3	9
Newfoundland	Laura Strong	2	10

=== Results ===
==== Draw 1 ====
Sheet B	1	2	3	4	5	6	7	8	9	10	Final
Yukon (Baldwin)	0	0	0	1	0	0	1	0	0	X	2
Saskatchewan (Miller)	1	1	0	0	1	0	0	0	1	X	4

Sheet D	1	2	3	4	5	6	7	8	9	10	Final
Nova Scotia (Doyle)	1	0	0	2	0	0	2	0	1	0	6
Newfoundland (Strong)	0	0	1	0	0	1	0	3	0	3	8

Sheet F	1	2	3	4	5	6	7	8	9	10	Final
Alberta (MacLachlan)	1	0	1	2	0	3	1	0	2	1	11
Northwest Territories (Kelln)	0	1	0	0	4	0	0	1	0	0	6

Sheet H	1	2	3	4	5	6	7	8	9	10	Final
Northern Ontario (Lee)	1	2	2	0	2	1	3	X	X	X	11
Manitoba (Jenion)	0	0	0	4	0	0	0	X	X	X	4

Sheet J	1	2	3	4	5	6	7	8	9	10	Final
Ontario (Reddick)	1	0	0	0	2	2	2	0	0	X	7
Quebec (Larouche)	0	0	1	1	0	0	0	2	1	X	5

Sheet L	1	2	3	4	5	6	7	8	9	10	11	Final
New Brunswick (Robichaud)	0	0	0	2	1	0	0	1	0	1	1	6
Prince Edward Island (Gaudet)	1	0	0	0	0	2	1	0	1	0	0	5

==== Draw 2 ====
Sheet A	1	2	3	4	5	6	7	8	9	10	Final
Nova Scotia (Doyle)	3	0	0	1	0	2	0	2	1	X	9
Manitoba (Jenion)	0	1	2	0	2	0	0	0	0	X	5

Sheet C	1	2	3	4	5	6	7	8	9	10	11	Final
Northern Ontario (Lee)	1	0	0	2	1	2	2	0	0	1	0	9
British Columbia (Zbeetnoff)	0	3	3	0	0	0	0	1	2	0	2	11

Sheet E	1	2	3	4	5	6	7	8	9	10	Final
Quebec (Larouche)	0	0	2	0	3	1	1	0	5	X	12
New Brunswick (Robichaud)	1	0	0	2	0	0	0	1	0	X	4

Sheet G	1	2	3	4	5	6	7	8	9	10	Final
Northwest Territories (Kelln)	1	0	2	0	0	0	0	0	0	X	3
Prince Edward Island (Gaudet)	0	1	0	1	1	1	0	1	1	X	6

Sheet I	1	2	3	4	5	6	7	8	9	10	Final
Newfoundland (Strong)	1	0	1	0	2	0	0	0	0	0	4
Saskatchewan (Miller)	0	1	0	1	0	0	0	0	1	3	6

Sheet K	1	2	3	4	5	6	7	8	9	10	Final
Ontario (Reddick)	1	0	0	0	1	2	0	1	0	0	5
Yukon (Baldwin)	0	0	2	0	0	0	1	0	2	1	6

==== Draw 3 ====
Sheet B	1	2	3	4	5	6	7	8	9	10	Final
Prince Edward Island (Gaudet)	1	0	1	0	2	1	0	0	2	0	7
British Columbia (Zbeetnoff)	0	2	0	1	0	0	1	1	0	1	6

Sheet D	1	2	3	4	5	6	7	8	9	10	Final
Manitoba (Jenion)	0	2	0	1	0	0	3	0	1	1	8
Alberta (MacLachlan)	0	0	2	0	0	2	0	1	0	0	5

Sheet F	1	2	3	4	5	6	7	8	9	10	Final
Nova Scotia (Doyle)	1	2	0	2	0	1	0	0	1	0	7
Ontario (Reddick)	0	0	1	0	3	0	2	1	0	1	8

Sheet H	1	2	3	4	5	6	7	8	9	10	Final
Saskatchewan (Miller)	0	0	1	0	2	0	0	0	0	X	3
Quebec (Larouche)	0	0	0	1	0	1	1	1	1	X	5

Sheet J	1	2	3	4	5	6	7	8	9	10	Final
Yukon (Baldwin)	1	2	0	0	2	0	3	3	X	X	11
Northwest Territories (Kelln)	0	0	1	1	0	2	0	0	X	X	4

Sheet L	1	2	3	4	5	6	7	8	9	10	Final
Newfoundland (Strong)	2	0	1	0	3	3	1	X	X	X	10
Northern Ontario (Lee)	0	1	0	1	0	0	0	X	X	X	2

==== Draw 4 ====
Sheet A	1	2	3	4	5	6	7	8	9	10	11	Final
Quebec (Larouche)	0	1	0	1	0	3	1	1	0	1	1	9
Northwest Territories (Kelln)	1	0	2	0	3	0	0	0	2	0	0	8

Sheet D	1	2	3	4	5	6	7	8	9	10	Final
New Brunswick (Robichaud)	0	1	0	0	0	1	0	X	X	X	2
Saskatchewan (Miller)	1	0	0	0	3	0	4	X	X	X	8

Sheet F	1	2	3	4	5	6	7	8	9	10	Final
Manitoba (Jenion)	1	0	0	0	4	0	0	0	3	X	8
Yukon (Baldwin)	0	0	2	1	0	0	1	2	0	X	6

Sheet G	1	2	3	4	5	6	7	8	9	10	Final
Northern Ontario (Lee)	0	1	0	0	1	0	2	0	0	X	4
Nova Scotia (Doyle)	1	0	1	1	0	1	0	4	4	X	12

Sheet I	1	2	3	4	5	6	7	8	9	10	Final
Alberta (MacLachlan)	1	0	1	0	0	2	0	1	0	1	6
Prince Edward Island (Gaudet)	0	1	0	0	1	0	0	0	2	0	4

Sheet L	1	2	3	4	5	6	7	8	9	10	11	Final
British Columbia (Zbeetnoff)	1	0	2	0	0	0	0	1	1	0	4	9
Ontario (Reddick)	0	0	0	1	0	1	2	0	0	1	0	5

==== Draw 5 ====
Sheet B	1	2	3	4	5	6	7	8	9	10	11	Final
Alberta (MacLachlan)	0	0	3	0	2	0	0	2	0	0	0	7
Northern Ontario (Lee)	2	1	0	1	0	0	1	0	1	1	1	8

Sheet D	1	2	3	4	5	6	7	8	9	10	Final
Ontario (Reddick)	0	1	0	1	0	2	0	0	1	1	6
Northwest Territories (Kelln)	0	0	1	0	1	0	1	2	0	0	5

Sheet F	1	2	3	4	5	6	7	8	9	10	Final
Saskatchewan (Miller)	0	0	0	0	1	1	1	0	2	X	5
British Columbia (Zbeetnoff)	0	0	1	0	0	0	0	1	0	X	2

Sheet H	1	2	3	4	5	6	7	8	9	10	Final
Prince Edward Island (Gaudet)	0	0	3	0	0	1	1	0	2	2	9
Yukon (Baldwin)	0	1	0	2	1	0	0	2	0	0	6

Sheet J	1	2	3	4	5	6	7	8	9	10	Final
Newfoundland (Strong)	0	1	0	0	0	2	0	0	0	X	3
Manitoba (Jenion)	1	0	0	2	0	0	3	1	2	X	9

Sheet K	1	2	3	4	5	6	7	8	9	10	Final
New Brunswick (Robichaud)	0	0	0	1	0	0	0	X	X	X	1
Nova Scotia (Doyle)	0	0	1	0	2	1	2	X	X	X	6

==== Draw 6 ====
Sheet A	1	2	3	4	5	6	7	8	9	10	Final
Ontario (Reddick)	1	0	1	0	1	2	0	0	1	0	6
Prince Edward Island (Gaudet)	0	2	0	3	0	0	1	1	0	1	8

Sheet C	1	2	3	4	5	6	7	8	9	10	Final
Yukon (Baldwin)	4	0	2	1	0	1	0	4	X	X	12
Newfoundland (Strong)	0	1	0	0	1	0	1	0	X	X	3

Sheet E	1	2	3	4	5	6	7	8	9	10	Final
Northwest Territories (Kelln)	0	1	2	0	0	0	0	0	1	0	4
New Brunswick (Robichaud)	1	0	0	0	1	1	2	1	0	1	7

Sheet G	1	2	3	4	5	6	7	8	9	10	Final
British Columbia (Zbeetnoff)	1	0	0	3	0	1	0	2	0	X	7
Quebec (Larouche)	0	3	2	0	2	0	2	0	0	X	9

Sheet J	1	2	3	4	5	6	7	8	9	10	Final
Nova Scotia (Doyle)	0	0	2	0	0	1	0	1	X	X	4
Alberta (MacLachlan)	1	2	0	2	1	0	2	0	X	X	8

Sheet K	1	2	3	4	5	6	7	8	9	10	Final
Northern Ontario (Lee)	0	1	0	2	0	0	1	0	0	X	4
Saskatchewan (Miller)	0	0	1	0	1	0	0	3	1	X	6

==== Draw 7 ====
Sheet B	1	2	3	4	5	6	7	8	9	10	Final
Yukon (Baldwin)	1	0	4	0	1	0	1	0	0	0	7
Nova Scotia (Doyle)	0	1	0	3	0	2	0	1	1	1	9

Sheet C	1	2	3	4	5	6	7	8	9	10	Final
Saskatchewan (Miller)	0	2	0	0	0	2	0	2	0	X	6
Alberta (MacLachlan)	0	0	0	1	0	0	1	0	0	X	2

Sheet F	1	2	3	4	5	6	7	8	9	10	Final
Quebec (Larouche)	2	0	2	1	1	0	2	0	0	0	8
Northern Ontario (Lee)	0	3	0	0	0	1	0	1	1	1	7

Sheet H	1	2	3	4	5	6	7	8	9	10	Final
Newfoundland (Strong)	3	0	0	0	4	0	1	0	0	0	8
Northwest Territories (Kelln)	0	2	0	0	0	2	0	1	3	1	9

Sheet J	1	2	3	4	5	6	7	8	9	10	Final
British Columbia (Zbeetnoff)	0	1	0	0	0	0	0	0	0	X	1
New Brunswick (Robichaud)	0	0	0	1	2	1	1	2	2	X	9

Sheet K	1	2	3	4	5	6	7	8	9	10	Final
Prince Edward Island (Gaudet)	1	0	1	0	1	0	0	0	0	X	3
Manitoba (Jenion)	0	2	0	1	0	1	1	0	2	X	7

==== Draw 8 ====
Sheet A	1	2	3	4	5	6	7	8	9	10	Final
Northwest Territories (Kelln)	1	1	1	0	3	0	2	0	0	0	8
British Columbia (Zbeetnoff)	0	0	0	1	0	1	0	3	1	3	9

Sheet D	1	2	3	4	5	6	7	8	9	10	Final
Prince Edward Island (Gaudet)	3	0	1	0	2	0	1	0	1	1	9
Northern Ontario (Lee)	0	4	0	1	0	2	0	1	0	0	8

Sheet E	1	2	3	4	5	6	7	8	9	10	Final
Saskatchewan (Miller)	0	0	0	1	0	1	0	X	X	X	2
Nova Scotia (Doyle)	3	2	2	0	1	0	2	X	X	X	10

Sheet G	1	2	3	4	5	6	7	8	9	10	Final
New Brunswick (Robichaud)	1	0	1	0	0	0	0	1	1	X	4
Ontario (Reddick)	0	2	0	0	1	1	1	0	0	X	5

Sheet I	1	2	3	4	5	6	7	8	9	10	Final
Manitoba (Jenion)	1	0	3	0	0	0	3	0	0	1	8
Quebec (Larouche)	0	2	0	2	0	1	0	2	0	0	7

Sheet K	1	2	3	4	5	6	7	8	9	10	Final
Alberta (MacLachlan)	0	2	0	1	1	0	2	1	1	X	8
Newfoundland (Strong)	1	0	0	0	0	3	0	0	0	X	4

==== Draw 9 ====
Sheet B	1	2	3	4	5	6	7	8	9	10	Final
Quebec (Larouche)	2	0	0	2	0	0	2	3	X	X	9
Newfoundland (Strong)	0	1	0	0	2	0	0	0	X	X	3

Sheet C	1	2	3	4	5	6	7	8	9	10	Final
Northwest Territories (Kelln)	1	0	0	1	0	1	1	0	2	0	6
Nova Scotia (Doyle)	0	0	3	0	4	0	0	1	0	2	10

Sheet E	1	2	3	4	5	6	7	8	9	10	Final
British Columbia (Zbeetnoff)	0	1	0	0	1	0	1	0	0	X	3
Alberta (MacLachlan)	0	0	2	1	0	1	0	3	1	X	8

Sheet G	1	2	3	4	5	6	7	8	9	10	Final
Manitoba (Jenion)	1	0	0	0	0	0	0	2	0	1	4
Saskatchewan (Miller)	0	0	0	0	1	1	0	0	1	0	3

Sheet I	1	2	3	4	5	6	7	8	9	10	11	Final
Northern Ontario (Lee)	0	1	0	0	1	1	0	1	1	1	0	6
Ontario (Reddick)	0	0	1	0	0	0	5	0	0	0	2	8

Sheet L	1	2	3	4	5	6	7	8	9	10	Final
New Brunswick (Robichaud)	1	0	0	3	0	0	0	2	0	0	6
Yukon (Baldwin)	0	2	0	0	0	1	0	0	1	1	5

==== Draw 10 ====
Sheet B	1	2	3	4	5	6	7	8	9	10	Final
Ontario (Reddick)	1	0	1	1	0	2	0	1	1	X	7
Alberta (MacLachlan)	0	1	0	0	1	0	1	0	0	X	3

Sheet C	1	2	3	4	5	6	7	8	9	10	Final
British Columbia (Zbeetnoff)	0	1	0	1	1	1	0	2	0	2	8
Manitoba (Jenion)	1	0	1	0	0	0	1	0	3	0	6

Sheet E	1	2	3	4	5	6	7	8	9	10	11	Final
Newfoundland (Strong)	0	0	1	0	1	0	0	0	2	0	0	4
New Brunswick (Robichaud)	0	0	0	1	0	0	1	0	0	2	1	5

Sheet H	1	2	3	4	5	6	7	8	9	10	Final
Yukon (Baldwin)	0	0	0	0	1	0	1	0	1	0	3
Quebec (Larouche)	0	0	0	0	0	1	0	3	0	3	7

Sheet I	1	2	3	4	5	6	7	8	9	10	Final
Saskatchewan (Miller)	0	0	2	0	1	2	1	0	X	X	6
Northwest Territories (Kelln)	0	0	0	0	0	0	0	1	X	X	1

Sheet L	1	2	3	4	5	6	7	8	9	10	Final
Nova Scotia (Doyle)	1	0	2	0	0	1	0	0	1	1	6
Prince Edward Island (Gaudet)	0	1	0	2	1	0	1	0	0	0	5

==== Draw 11 ====
Sheet B	1	2	3	4	5	6	7	8	9	10	Final
Northwest Territories (Hoffman)	1	0	0	0	2	0	2	1	0	X	6
Manitoba (Jenion)	0	0	1	0	0	1	0	0	2	X	4

Sheet D	1	2	3	4	5	6	7	8	9	10	Final
Alberta (MacLachlan)	0	0	3	0	1	0	2	0	2	0	8
Yukon (Baldwin)	1	3	0	1	0	2	0	1	0	3	11

Sheet E	1	2	3	4	5	6	7	8	9	10	11	Final
Prince Edward Island (Gaudet)	2	0	2	0	0	3	0	0	0	1	0	8
Quebec (Larouche)	0	1	0	1	1	0	1	1	3	0	1	9

Sheet H	1	2	3	4	5	6	7	8	9	10	Final
New Brunswick (Robichaud)	0	0	1	0	0	0	4	0	0	0	5
Northern Ontario (Lee)	1	0	0	0	0	2	0	2	1	1	7

Sheet I	1	2	3	4	5	6	7	8	9	10	Final
Nova Scotia (Doyle)	0	0	0	2	0	3	1	0	2	X	8
British Columbia (Zbeetnoff)	0	0	0	0	1	0	0	3	0	X	4

Sheet L	1	2	3	4	5	6	7	8	9	10	Final
Ontario (Reddick)	0	0	0	3	0	1	3	0	0	X	7
Newfoundland (Strong)	1	0	1	0	0	0	0	1	1	X	4

==== Draw 12 ====
Sheet A	1	2	3	4	5	6	7	8	9	10	Final
Yukon (Baldwin)	1	0	2	0	0	1	0	2	2	X	8
British Columbia (Zbeetnoff)	0	2	0	0	1	0	1	0	0	X	4

Sheet D	1	2	3	4	5	6	7	8	9	10	Final
Newfoundland (Strong)	2	1	0	1	0	0	0	0	0	X	4
Prince Edward Island (Gaudet)	0	0	1	0	1	1	1	2	2	X	8

Sheet E	1	2	3	4	5	6	7	8	9	10	Final
Northwest Territories (Kelln)	3	2	0	0	2	0	3	0	4	X	14
Northern Ontario (Lee)	0	0	2	1	0	1	0	2	0	X	6

Sheet H	1	2	3	4	5	6	7	8	9	10	Final
Saskatchewan (Miller)	0	0	0	3	0	0	0	3	0	X	6
Ontario (Reddick)	0	0	0	0	0	1	1	0	1	X	3

Sheet J	1	2	3	4	5	6	7	8	9	10	Final
Manitoba (Jenion)	0	0	0	3	0	0	1	1	0	1	6
New Brunswick (Robichaud)	0	0	2	0	0	1	0	0	1	0	4

Sheet L	1	2	3	4	5	6	7	8	9	10	Final
Quebec (Larouche)	1	0	0	2	0	1	0	2	1	X	7
Alberta (MacLachlan)	0	1	1	0	1	0	2	0	0	X	5

==== Draw 13 ====
Sheet A	1	2	3	4	5	6	7	8	9	10	11	Final
Alberta (MacLachlan)	1	1	0	2	0	0	0	2	0	1	0	7
New Brunswick (Robichaud)	0	0	3	0	0	0	2	0	2	0	1	8

Sheet D	1	2	3	4	5	6	7	8	9	10	Final
Quebec (Larouche)	0	0	1	0	1	0	0	1	0	X	3
Nova Scotia (Doyle)	0	1	0	1	0	2	2	0	1	X	7

Sheet E	1	2	3	4	5	6	7	8	9	10	Final
Manitoba (Jenion)	1	0	0	0	0	1	2	0	0	0	4
Ontario (Reddick)	0	0	0	2	2	0	0	1	0	2	7

Sheet G	1	2	3	4	5	6	7	8	9	10	11	Final
British Columbia (Zbeetnoff)	2	1	0	2	2	0	1	0	0	0	1	9
Newfoundland (Strong)	0	0	1	0	0	2	0	3	2	0	0	8

Sheet J	1	2	3	4	5	6	7	8	9	10	Final
Prince Edward Island (Gaudet)	1	0	0	0	1	0	1	0	1	0	4
Saskatchewan (Miller)	0	1	0	1	0	2	0	1	0	1	6

Sheet K	1	2	3	4	5	6	7	8	9	10	Final
Northern Ontario (Lee)	4	0	0	0	0	0	2	0	1	0	7
Yukon (Baldwin)	0	1	0	0	2	1	0	0	0	5	9

=== Playoffs ===
Semifinal		Final
Quebec	6
Saskatchewan	3	Quebec	9
		Nova Scotia	2

==== Semifinal ====
Sheet G	1	2	3	4	5	6	7	8	9	10	Final
Quebec (Larouche)	2	0	0	0	0	2	0	1	1	X	6
Saskatchewan (Miller)	0	1	1	0	0	0	1	0	0	X	3

Player percentages
Quebec		Saskatchewan	
Valerie Grenier	83%	Kristin Regnier	68%
Marie-Eve Letourneau	64%	Stacy Helm	71%
Nancy Belanger	79%	Marliese Miller	53%
Marie-France Larouche	70%	Stefanie Miller	67%
Total	74%	Total	64%

==== Final ====
Sheet E	1	2	3	4	5	6	7	8	9	10	Final
Quebec (Larouche)	2	1	3	0	2	0	1	0	X	X	9
Nova Scotia (Doyle)	0	0	0	1	0	0	0	1	X	X	2

Player percentages
Quebec		Nova Scotia	
Valerie Grenier	67%	Kelly MacIntosh	58%
Marie-Eve Letourneau	78%	Krista Normore	55%
Nancy Belanger	69%	Beth Roach	48%
Marie-France Larouche	92%	Meredith Doyle	55%
Total	77%	Total	54%

== Qualification ==
=== Ontario ===
The Ontario Junior Curling Championships were held at the Minden Curling Club in Minden, with the finals on January 10.

After posting a 7-0 round robin record, Ottawa's Jenn Hanna rink had to be beaten twice by Milton's Julie Reddick for the women's championship. Reddick won both games, 6-3 and 6-5.

In the men's final, John Morris of the Ottawa Curling Club defeated the neighbouring Rideau Curling Club Sebastien Robillard rink 7-4. Robillard had to win two tiebreaker matches before beating the Tam Heather club's Daryl Britt in the semifinal, 9-3.
