= 2000 Canadian Junior Curling Championships =

The 2000 Kärcher Canadian Junior Curling Championships were held February 5–13 at the Beausejour Curling Club in Moncton, New Brunswick. The winning teams represented Canada at the 2000 World Junior Curling Championships.

== Men's ==
=== Teams ===
Province / Territory	Skip	Third	Second	Lead
Alberta	Darren Moulding	Thomas Usselman	Ryan Inaba	Matt Taylor
British Columbia	Brad Kuhn	Kevin Folk	Ryan Kuhn	Hugh Bennett
Manitoba	Matt Wozniak	David Hamblin	Andrew Melnuk	Rob Stupnisky
New Brunswick	Rob Heffernan	Jamie Newson	Ryan Porter	Kevin Tippett
Newfoundland	Brad Gushue	Mark Nichols	Jamie Korab	Mike Adam
Northern Ontario	Joe Scharf	Rob Champagne	Colin Koivula	Mike McCarville
Northwest Territories	Sheldon Wettig	Tyler Janz	Jared Cowan	Matthew Green
Nova Scotia	Graham Breckon	Matthew Mader	Mark Robar	David Backman
Ontario	Jason Young	Tyler Morgan	Kris Bourgeois	Jeff Young
Prince Edward Island	Tim Hockin	Darren Higgins	Matthew Piercey	Matthew MacDonald
Quebec	Phillipe Brassard	Gregory Cantin	Jean-François Charest	Patrick Duchesneau
Saskatchewan	Brock Montgomery	Brent Gedak	Derek Owens	Malcolm Vanstone
Yukon	Wes Klippert	Scott Nguyen	Andrew Sherstone	Alex Cameron

=== Standings ===
Locale	Skip	W	L
British Columbia	Brad Kuhn	11	1
Newfoundland	Brad Gushue	10	2
Saskatchewan	Brock Montgomery	9	3
Ontario	Jason Young	9	3
Northern Ontario	Joe Scharf	7	5
New Brunswick	Rob Heffernan	6	6
Alberta	Darren Moulding	5	7
Northwest Territories	Sheldon Wettig	5	7
Manitoba	Matt Wozniak	5	7
Nova Scotia	Graham Breckon	4	8
Quebec	Phillipe Brassard	4	8
Prince Edward Island	Tim Hockin	3	9
Yukon	Wes Klippert	0	12

=== Results ===
==== Draw 1 ====
Sheet A	1	2	3	4	5	6	7	8	9	10	Final
Quebec (Brassard)	0	5	1	0	2	0	0	0	0	X	8
Prince Edward Island (Hockin)	0	0	0	2	0	2	0	0	1	X	5

Sheet E	1	2	3	4	5	6	7	8	9	10	Final
New Brunswick (Heffernan)	0	0	0	1	0	2	0	0	X	X	3
Saskatchewan (Montgomery)	0	0	1	0	1	0	3	3	X	X	8

Sheet G	1	2	3	4	5	6	7	8	9	10	Final
Ontario (Young)	0	0	2	0	1	1	0	0	0	1	5
British Columbia (Kuhn)	1	0	0	1	0	0	1	1	0	0	4

Sheet I	1	2	3	4	5	6	7	8	9	10	Final
Newfoundland (Gushue)	2	1	1	0	0	2	1	0	1	X	8
Manitoba (Wozniak)	0	0	0	1	1	0	0	2	0	X	4

==== Draw 2 ====
Sheet A	1	2	3	4	5	6	7	8	9	10	Final
Northwest Territories (Wettig)	1	0	1	0	0	0	1	0	3	X	6
Alberta (Moulding)	0	2	0	0	3	1	0	3	0	X	9

Sheet C	1	2	3	4	5	6	7	8	9	10	Final
Northern Ontario (Scharf)	0	0	0	0	0	0	2	0	X	X	2
Quebec (Brassard)	0	0	0	2	1	3	0	1	X	X	7

Sheet E	1	2	3	4	5	6	7	8	9	10	Final
Yukon (Klippert)	2	0	0	0	0	0	X	X	X	X	2
Newfoundland (Gushue)	0	2	3	3	2	0	X	X	X	X	10

Sheet I	1	2	3	4	5	6	7	8	9	10	Final
Nova Scotia (Breckon)	0	0	1	0	0	1	0	3	0	X	5
Ontario (Young)	0	0	0	4	1	0	1	0	1	X	7

==== Draw 3 ====
Sheet B	1	2	3	4	5	6	7	8	9	10	Final
Manitoba (Wozniak)	0	0	3	3	0	0	1	0	1	X	8
New Brunswick (Heffernan)	0	0	0	0	3	0	0	1	0	X	4

Sheet D	1	2	3	4	5	6	7	8	9	10	Final
Prince Edward Island (Hockin)	0	1	1	0	0	1	1	1	0	X	5
Nova Scotia (Breckon)	1	0	0	3	1	0	0	0	3	X	8

Sheet F	1	2	3	4	5	6	7	8	9	10	11	Final
Alberta (Moulding)	0	0	0	0	0	1	0	1	1	0	0	3
Northern Ontario (Scharf)	0	0	0	0	0	0	1	0	0	2	2	5

Sheet H	1	2	3	4	5	6	7	8	9	10	Final
Saskatchewan (Montgomery)	1	0	3	0	0	2	0	0	1	X	7
Northwest Territories (Wettig)	0	1	0	1	1	0	1	0	0	X	4

Sheet J	1	2	3	4	5	6	7	8	9	10	Final
British Columbia (Kuhn)	2	1	0	2	1	0	0	3	X	X	9
Yukon (Klippert)	0	0	1	0	0	0	1	0	X	X	2

==== Draw 4 ====
Sheet A	1	2	3	4	5	6	7	8	9	10	Final
Newfoundland (Gushue)	0	0	0	2	0	0	0	3	0	0	5
New Brunswick (Heffernan)	1	0	1	0	1	0	1	0	1	1	6

Sheet C	1	2	3	4	5	6	7	8	9	10	Final
Saskatchewan (Montgomery)	1	0	1	2	1	3	X	X	X	X	8
Alberta (Moulding)	0	1	0	0	0	0	X	X	X	X	1

Sheet E	1	2	3	4	5	6	7	8	9	10	Final
Prince Edward Island (Hockin)	0	1	0	0	1	0	1	0	0	X	3
Ontario (Young)	0	0	1	2	0	2	0	2	2	X	9

Sheet G	1	2	3	4	5	6	7	8	9	10	Final
Nova Scotia (Breckon)	0	0	1	0	3	0	0	1	0	X	5
British Columbia (Kuhn)	0	1	0	1	0	3	2	0	1	X	8

Sheet I	1	2	3	4	5	6	7	8	9	10	Final
Northwest Territories (Wettig)	1	0	0	0	1	0	2	0	0	X	4
Northern Ontario (Scharf)	0	2	0	2	0	2	0	0	1	X	7

==== Draw 5 ====
Sheet D	1	2	3	4	5	6	7	8	9	10	Final
Yukon (Klippert)	1	0	1	0	0	0	X	X	X	X	2
Manitoba (Wozniak)	0	3	0	4	3	1	X	X	X	X	11

Sheet G	1	2	3	4	5	6	7	8	9	10	Final
British Columbia (Kuhn)	1	0	3	0	1	0	1	0	2	X	8
Newfoundland (Gushue)	0	2	0	1	0	1	0	0	0	X	4

Sheet I	1	2	3	4	5	6	7	8	9	10	Final
Alberta (Moulding)	2	0	2	0	6	X	X	X	X	X	10
Quebec (Brassard)	0	0	0	1	0	X	X	X	X	X	1

==== Draw 6 ====
Sheet B	1	2	3	4	5	6	7	8	9	10	Final
Quebec (Brassard)	0	1	0	0	0	1	0	0	1	0	3
Nova Scotia (Breckon)	0	0	1	0	1	0	0	2	0	2	6

Sheet C	1	2	3	4	5	6	7	8	9	10	Final
New Brunswick (Heffernan)	1	0	0	1	2	1	0	1	0	X	6
Northwest Territories (Wettig)	0	1	0	0	0	0	0	0	2	X	3

Sheet F	1	2	3	4	5	6	7	8	9	10	11	Final
Manitoba (Wozniak)	0	0	0	0	1	0	3	0	0	0	1	5
Saskatchewan (Montgomery)	0	0	1	0	0	1	0	0	2	0	0	4

Sheet H	1	2	3	4	5	6	7	8	9	10	Final
Northern Ontario (Scharf)	0	2	0	0	1	3	3	X	X	X	9
Prince Edward Island (Hockin)	0	0	0	1	0	0	0	X	X	X	1

Sheet I	1	2	3	4	5	6	7	8	9	10	Final
Ontario (Young)	1	0	1	0	3	0	0	0	4	X	9
Yukon (Klippert)	0	0	0	1	0	0	1	0	0	X	2

==== Draw 7 ====
Sheet B	1	2	3	4	5	6	7	8	9	10	Final
Ontario (Young)	1	1	0	0	0	0	0	0	1	0	3
Newfoundland (Gushue)	0	0	0	0	0	2	1	1	0	1	5

Sheet D	1	2	3	4	5	6	7	8	9	10	Final
Northwest Territories (Wettig)	0	1	0	2	0	0	1	0	4	X	8
Quebec (Brassard)	0	0	1	0	1	0	0	2	0	X	4

Sheet E	1	2	3	4	5	6	7	8	9	10	Final
Northern Ontario (Scharf)	0	0	1	0	1	0	3	0	1	2	8
Nova Scotia (Breckon)	1	1	0	1	0	2	0	2	0	0	7

Sheet G	1	2	3	4	5	6	7	8	9	10	Final
Yukon (Klippert)	1	0	0	1	0	0	1	0	1	X	4
New Brunswick (Heffernan)	0	1	1	0	1	1	0	3	0	X	7

==== Draw 8 ====
Sheet C	1	2	3	4	5	6	7	8	9	10	Final
Prince Edward Island (Hockin)	0	0	1	2	0	0	1	0	4	0	8
British Columbia (Kuhn)	1	1	0	0	0	2	0	2	0	3	9

Sheet E	1	2	3	4	5	6	7	8	9	10	Final
Manitoba (Wozniak)	1	0	0	0	0	1	1	0	1	X	4
Northwest Territories (Wettig)	0	1	1	2	2	0	0	1	0	X	7

Sheet H	1	2	3	4	5	6	7	8	9	10	11	Final
Newfoundland (Gushue)	0	0	2	0	0	1	0	2	0	0	1	6
Saskatchewan (Montgomery)	0	0	0	0	3	0	1	0	1	0	0	5

Sheet J	1	2	3	4	5	6	7	8	9	10	Final
New Brunswick (Heffernan)	1	0	2	0	0	0	1	1	1	X	6
Alberta (Moulding)	0	2	0	2	0	0	0	0	0	X	4

==== Draw 9 ====
Sheet A	1	2	3	4	5	6	7	8	9	10	Final
Saskatchewan (Montgomery)	0	1	0	0	1	0	1	0	0	2	5
Northern Ontario (Scharf)	0	0	0	2	0	1	0	0	1	0	4

Sheet C	1	2	3	4	5	6	7	8	9	10	Final
Nova Scotia (Breckon)	1	2	1	0	3	3	X	X	X	X	10
Yukon (Klippert)	0	0	0	2	0	0	X	X	X	X	2

Sheet F	1	2	3	4	5	6	7	8	9	10	Final
Quebec (Brassard)	0	0	0	0	0	0	0	1	X	X	1
Ontario (Young)	0	0	1	1	1	3	1	0	X	X	7

Sheet G	1	2	3	4	5	6	7	8	9	10	Final
Alberta (Moulding)	0	0	0	0	0	1	0	1	X	X	2
Prince Edward Island (Hockin)	0	0	2	1	3	0	1	0	X	X	7

Sheet I	1	2	3	4	5	6	7	8	9	10	Final
British Columbia (Kuhn)	2	0	0	2	2	0	1	2	X	X	9
Manitoba (Wozniak)	0	0	1	0	0	2	0	0	X	X	3

==== Draw 10 ====
Sheet A	1	2	3	4	5	6	7	8	9	10	Final
Quebec (Brassard)	0	0	0	2	0	2	0	1	1	0	6
British Columbia (Kuhn)	1	0	1	0	2	0	3	0	0	1	8

Sheet D	1	2	3	4	5	6	7	8	9	10	11	Final
New Brunswick (Heffernan)	1	0	0	0	0	0	0	1	0	0	1	3
Northern Ontario (Scharf)	0	0	0	0	0	1	0	0	0	1	0	2

Sheet H	1	2	3	4	5	6	7	8	9	10	Final
Manitoba (Wozniak)	2	0	1	1	0	0	1	0	X	X	5
Alberta (Moulding)	0	4	0	0	2	2	0	4	X	X	12

==== Draw 11 ====
Sheet A	1	2	3	4	5	6	7	8	9	10	Final
Alberta (Moulding)	0	1	1	0	1	1	0	0	1	0	5
Nova Scotia (Breckon)	0	0	0	1	0	0	1	1	0	1	4

Sheet D	1	2	3	4	5	6	7	8	9	10	Final
Prince Edward Island (Hockin)	0	1	2	1	1	0	2	0	1	X	8
Yukon (Klippert)	1	0	0	0	0	2	0	1	0	X	4

Sheet F	1	2	3	4	5	6	7	8	9	10	Final
Newfoundland (Gushue)	0	0	3	0	2	0	0	2	0	X	7
Northwest Territories (Wettig)	0	0	0	1	0	2	1	0	1	X	5

Sheet G	1	2	3	4	5	6	7	8	9	10	Final
Saskatchewan (Montgomery)	0	0	0	1	0	1	0	3	0	2	7
Quebec (Brassard)	0	0	1	0	1	0	3	0	1	0	6

Sheet J	1	2	3	4	5	6	7	8	9	10	Final
Northern Ontario (Scharf)	0	0	2	0	3	0	3	X	X	X	8
Ontario (Young)	0	0	0	1	0	2	0	X	X	X	3

==== Draw 12 ====
Sheet B	1	2	3	4	5	6	7	8	9	10	Final
Yukon (Klippert)	0	0	3	0	2	0	0	0	0	0	5
Saskatchewan (Montgomery)	1	0	0	1	0	1	2	0	2	1	8

Sheet D	1	2	3	4	5	6	7	8	9	10	Final
Nova Scotia (Breckon)	0	2	0	2	1	0	0	2	0	0	7
Newfoundland (Gushue)	3	0	1	0	0	0	3	0	1	3	11

Sheet E	1	2	3	4	5	6	7	8	9	10	Final
Ontario (Young)	1	0	0	3	2	1	1	X	X	X	8
Manitoba (Wozniak)	0	1	1	0	0	0	0	X	X	X	2

Sheet H	1	2	3	4	5	6	7	8	9	10	Final
British Columbia (Kuhn)	1	0	0	1	0	2	1	0	1	X	6
New Brunswick (Heffernan)	0	0	1	0	1	0	0	1	0	X	3

Sheet J	1	2	3	4	5	6	7	8	9	10	Final
Northwest Territories (Wettig)	0	0	4	0	3	0	1	0	1	0	9
Prince Edward Island (Hockin)	0	1	0	2	0	2	0	2	0	1	8

==== Draw 13 ====
Sheet B	1	2	3	4	5	6	7	8	9	10	Final
Newfoundland (Gushue)	2	0	0	1	0	0	4	2	X	X	9
Alberta (Moulding)	0	0	2	0	1	0	0	0	X	X	3

Sheet C	1	2	3	4	5	6	7	8	9	10	Final
Manitoba (Wozniak)	0	1	0	0	0	0	0	3	0	X	4
Northern Ontario (Scharf)	0	0	0	0	3	2	1	0	3	X	9

Sheet H	1	2	3	4	5	6	7	8	9	10	Final
Saskatchewan (Montgomery)	0	0	0	0	2	0	0	1	1	1	5
Prince Edward Island (Hockin)	0	0	0	0	0	1	1	0	0	0	2

Sheet J	1	2	3	4	5	6	7	8	9	10	Final
Yukon (Klippert)	0	1	0	2	0	1	0	3	0	1	8
Northwest Territories (Wettig)	3	0	1	0	2	0	2	0	1	0	9

==== Draw 14 ====
Sheet A	1	2	3	4	5	6	7	8	9	10	Final
Ontario (Young)	1	0	3	4	0	0	2	2	X	X	12
New Brunswick (Heffernan)	0	1	0	0	2	2	0	0	X	X	5

Sheet E	1	2	3	4	5	6	7	8	9	10	Final
Quebec (Brassart)	0	0	3	1	0	1	1	1	3	X	10
Yukon (Klippert)	0	1	0	0	2	0	0	0	0	X	3

Sheet G	1	2	3	4	5	6	7	8	9	10	Final
Nova Scotia (Breckon)	0	0	2	0	0	2	0	1	0	0	5
Manitoba (Wozniak)	0	3	0	1	1	0	1	0	0	1	7

Sheet J	1	2	3	4	5	6	7	8	9	10	11	Final
British Columbia (Kuhn)	0	0	2	0	0	2	1	1	0	0	1	7
Saskatchewan (Montgomery)	0	0	0	3	0	0	0	0	2	1	0	6

==== Draw 15 ====
Sheet B	1	2	3	4	5	6	7	8	9	10	Final
Northwest Territories (Wettig)	3	0	0	1	0	0	0	2	2	1	9
Nova Scotia (Breckon)	0	3	2	0	1	0	1	0	0	0	7

Sheet D	1	2	3	4	5	6	7	8	9	10	Final
Alberta (Moulding)	0	2	0	0	0	1	0	X	X	X	3
Ontario (Young)	1	0	2	1	1	0	5	X	X	X	10

Sheet F	1	2	3	4	5	6	7	8	9	10	Final
Northern Ontario (Scharf)	0	0	1	1	0	0	0	2	0	0	4
British Columbia (Kuhn)	0	3	0	0	1	2	0	0	0	0	6

Sheet G	1	2	3	4	5	6	7	8	9	10	11	Final
New Brunswick (Heffernan)	0	1	0	1	0	0	3	0	3	0	0	8
Quebec (Brassard)	0	0	2	0	2	1	0	2	0	1	1	9

Sheet J	1	2	3	4	5	6	7	8	9	10	Final
Prince Edward Island (Hockin)	0	1	0	0	1	0	0	1	0	X	3
Newfoundland (Gushue)	0	0	3	0	0	2	1	0	2	X	8

==== Draw 16 ====
Sheet D	1	2	3	4	5	6	7	8	9	10	Final
British Columbia (Kuhn)	2	0	0	0	0	2	0	5	X	X	9
Northwest Territories (Wettig)	0	1	0	1	0	0	1	0	X	X	3

Sheet F	1	2	3	4	5	6	7	8	9	10	Final
Saskatchewan (Montgomery)	0	0	1	0	0	0	2	0	0	1	4
Nova Scotia (Breckon)	0	0	0	0	2	0	0	0	1	0	3

Sheet H	1	2	3	4	5	6	7	8	9	10	Final
Yukon (Klippert)	0	1	0	0	1	1	0	0	1	X	4
Alberta (Moulding)	0	0	2	1	0	0	0	4	0	X	7

Sheet J	1	2	3	4	5	6	7	8	9	10	11	12	Final
Manitoba (Wozniak)	0	0	0	0	1	0	0	0	2	0	0	1	4
Quebec (Brassard)	0	0	0	1	0	1	0	0	0	1	0	0	3

==== Draw 17 ====
Sheet A	1	2	3	4	5	6	7	8	9	10	Final
Northern Ontario (Scharf)	2	1	1	1	3	1	X	X	X	X	9
Yukon (Klippert)	0	0	0	0	0	0	X	X	X	X	0

Sheet C	1	2	3	4	5	6	7	8	9	10	Final
Quebec (Brassard)	0	0	0	0	0	0	0	1	1	X	2
Newfoundland (Gushue)	0	0	1	1	2	0	1	0	0	X	5

Sheet F	1	2	3	4	5	6	7	8	9	10	Final
New Brunswick (Heffernan)	1	0	1	0	2	0	0	3	0	X	7
Prince Edward Island (Hockin)	0	1	0	1	0	1	0	0	2	X	5

Sheet G	1	2	3	4	5	6	7	8	9	10	Final
Northwest Territories (Wettig)	2	0	0	0	1	0	1	X	X	X	4
Ontario (Young)	0	1	3	3	0	2	0	X	X	X	9

==== Draw 18 ====
Sheet A	1	2	3	4	5	6	7	8	9	10	Final
Prince Edward Island (Hockin)	1	0	1	0	4	0	0	0	0	1	7
Manitoba (Wozniak)	0	0	0	2	0	3	0	1	0	0	6

Sheet C	1	2	3	4	5	6	7	8	9	10	Final
Ontario (Young)	0	0	0	0	2	1	1	0	0	0	4
Saskatchewan (Montgomery)	0	0	0	1	0	0	0	2	1	2	6

Sheet E	1	2	3	4	5	6	7	8	9	10	Final
Alberta (Moulding)	1	1	0	0	0	2	0	0	X	X	4
British Columbia (Kuhn)	0	0	2	1	3	0	3	1	X	X	10

Sheet G	1	2	3	4	5	6	7	8	9	10	Final
Newfoundland (Gushue)	0	2	0	0	1	1	0	1	2	X	7
Northern Ontario (Scharf)	0	0	0	0	0	0	2	0	0	X	2

Sheet I	1	2	3	4	5	6	7	8	9	10	Final
Nova Scotia (Breckon)	0	0	3	0	1	0	1	1	1	X	7
New Brunswick (Heffernan)	0	0	0	2	0	1	0	0	0	X	3

=== Playoffs ===
Tiebreaker		Semifinal		Final
Saskatchewan	8
Ontario	4	Newfoundland	6
		Saskatchewan	3
				British Columbia	8
				Newfoundland	7

==== Tiebreaker ====
Sheet H	1	2	3	4	5	6	7	8	9	10	Final
Saskatchewan (Montgomery)	0	1	2	2	0	2	1	0	0	X	8
Ontario (Young)	0	0	0	0	2	0	0	2	0	X	4

Player percentages
Saskatchewan		Ontario	
Malcolm Vanstone	83%	Jeff Young	94%
Derek Owens	94%	Kris Bourgeois	96%
Brent Gedak	94%	Tyler Morgan	89%
Brock Montgomery	93%	Jason Young	85%
Total	92%	Total	91%

==== Semifinal ====
Sheet I	1	2	3	4	5	6	7	8	9	10	Final
Newfoundland (Gushue)	1	1	0	1	1	0	1	1	0	X	6
Saskatchewan (Montgomery)	0	0	1	0	0	1	0	0	1	X	3

Player percentages
Newfoundland		Saskatchewan	
Mike Adam	81%	Malcolm Vanstone	86%
Jamie Korab	74%	Derek Owens	80%
Mark Nichols	79%	Brent Gedak	75%
Brad Gushue	83%	Brock Montgomery	75%
Total	79%	Total	79%

==== Final ====
Sheet B	1	2	3	4	5	6	7	8	9	10	11	Final
British Columbia (Kuhn)	0	1	0	1	0	2	0	2	0	1	1	8
Newfoundland (Gushue)	0	0	2	0	1	0	2	0	2	0	0	7

Player percentages
British Columbia		Newfoundland	
Hugh Bennett	78%	Mike Adam	77%
Ryan Kuhn	81%	Jamie Korab	76%
Kevin Folk	74%	Mark Nichols	84%
Brad Kuhn	82%	Brad Gushue	69%
Total	79%	Total	77%

== Women's ==
=== Teams ===
Province / Territory	Skip	Third	Second	Lead
Alberta	Tiffany Odegard	Suzie Iskiw	Jennifer Vejprava	Natalie Morgan
British Columbia	Nadia Zbeetnoff	Barbara Zbeetnoff (skip)	Kristen Recksiedler	Mila Hockley
Manitoba	Ainsley Gunnlaugson	Ainsley Holowec	Cherie-Ann Loder	Jillian Gunnlaugson
New Brunswick	Sylvie Robichaud	Crissy Inman	Nicole Arsenault	Marie Richard
Newfoundland	Laura Strong	Cindy Miller	Kym Conway	Beth Hamilton
Northern Ontario	Krista Scharf	Angie Del Pino	Laura Armitage	Maggie Carr
Northwest Territories	Brie-Anne Jefferson	Danielle Ellis	Tristan Kowan	Jenna Alexander
Nova Scotia	Teri Lake	Katie Bobcock	Stephanie Turnbull	Sarah Smith
Ontario	Julie Reddick	Karen Vachon	Leigh Armstrong	Stephanie Leachman
Prince Edward Island	Suzanne Gaudet	Stefanie Richard	Robyn MacPhee	Kelly Higgins
Quebec	Marie Lapierre	Catherine Menard	Caroline Lacombe	Genevieve Marchand
Saskatchewan	Stefanie Miller	Marliese Miller	Stacy Helm	Amanda MacDonald
Yukon	Nicole Baldwin	Jaime Milward	Hailey Birnie	Tia-Jayne Clark

=== Standings ===
Locale	Skip	W	L
Prince Edward Island	Suzanne Gaudet	10	2
Saskatchewan	Stefanie Miller	9	3
Alberta	Tiffany Odegard	9	3
Ontario	Julie Reddick	8	4
British Columbia	Barbara Zbeetnoff	7	5
Northern Ontario	Krista Scharf	7	5
Manitoba	Ainsley Gunnlaugson	6	6
Quebec	Marie Lapierre	6	6
Newfoundland	Laura Strong	4	8
Nova Scotia	Teri Lake	4	8
New Brunswick	Sylvie Robichaud	4	8
Yukon	Nicole Baldwin	3	9
Northwest Territories	Brie-Anne Jefferson	1	11

=== Results ===
==== Draw 1 ====
Sheet B	1	2	3	4	5	6	7	8	9	10	Final
Quebec (Lapierre)	2	0	0	2	0	1	0	1	0	X	6
Prince Edward Island (Gaudet)	0	1	0	0	1	0	2	0	1	X	5

Sheet F	1	2	3	4	5	6	7	8	9	10	Final
New Brunswick (Robichaud)	0	0	0	1	0	0	0	0	1	X	2
Saskatchewan (Miller)	0	0	1	0	0	2	0	0	0	X	3

Sheet H	1	2	3	4	5	6	7	8	9	10	Final
Ontario (Reddick)	0	0	0	0	2	1	0	0	1	X	4
British Columbia (Zbeetnoff)	3	0	1	1	0	0	3	0	0	X	8

Sheet J	1	2	3	4	5	6	7	8	9	10	11	Final
Newfoundland (Strong)	1	0	3	0	0	0	1	0	2	1	1	9
Manitoba (Gunnlaugson)	0	3	0	1	0	1	0	3	0	0	0	8

==== Draw 2 ====
Sheet B	1	2	3	4	5	6	7	8	9	10	Final
Northwest Territories (Jefferson)	0	0	1	0	1	1	0	0	0	X	3
Alberta (Odegard)	1	2	0	1	0	0	2	2	3	X	11

Sheet D	1	2	3	4	5	6	7	8	9	10	Final
Northern Ontario (Scharf)	1	0	2	0	1	0	0	1	1	X	6
Quebec (Lapierre)	0	0	0	1	0	1	1	0	0	X	3

Sheet F	1	2	3	4	5	6	7	8	9	10	Final
Yukon (Baldwin)	2	0	1	0	1	1	4	0	X	X	9
Newfoundland (Strong)	0	1	0	1	0	0	0	1	X	X	3

Sheet J	1	2	3	4	5	6	7	8	9	10	Final
Nova Scotia (Lake)	1	0	0	0	0	1	1	1	0	2	6
Ontario (Reddick)	0	0	2	1	1	0	0	0	1	0	5

==== Draw 3 ====
Sheet A	1	2	3	4	5	6	7	8	9	10	Final
Manitoba (Gunnlaugson)	2	0	0	1	1	1	0	2	0	X	7
New Brunswick (Robichaud)	0	1	1	0	0	0	1	0	1	X	4

Sheet C	1	2	3	4	5	6	7	8	9	10	Final
Prince Edward Island (Gaudet)	2	0	1	0	0	2	2	0	2	X	9
Nova Scotia (Lake)	0	1	0	0	1	0	0	1	0	X	3

Sheet E	1	2	3	4	5	6	7	8	9	10	Final
Alberta (Odegard)	0	0	2	0	0	0	0	1	1	X	4
Northern Ontario (Scharf)	0	0	0	2	0	3	1	0	0	X	6

Sheet G	1	2	3	4	5	6	7	8	9	10	Final
Saskatchewan (Miller)	2	1	3	0	3	0	5	X	X	X	14
Northwest Territories (Jefferson)	0	0	0	2	0	1	0	X	X	X	3

Sheet I	1	2	3	4	5	6	7	8	9	10	Final
British Columbia (Zbeetnoff)	1	0	0	0	1	0	0	3	0	4	9
Yukon (Baldwin)	0	1	1	1	0	1	3	0	1	0	8

==== Draw 4 ====
Sheet B	1	2	3	4	5	6	7	8	9	10	11	Final
Newfoundland (Strong)	1	0	1	0	0	1	2	0	1	0	3	9
New Brunswick (Robichaud)	0	1	0	0	1	0	0	2	0	2	0	6

Sheet D	1	2	3	4	5	6	7	8	9	10	Final
Saskatchewan (Miller)	2	0	1	0	2	0	0	2	0	1	8
Alberta (Odegard)	0	2	0	1	0	1	1	0	2	0	7

Sheet F	1	2	3	4	5	6	7	8	9	10	Final
Prince Edward Island (Gaudet)	0	0	0	0	1	0	0	2	1	2	6
Ontario (Reddick)	0	0	1	0	0	1	1	0	0	0	3

Sheet H	1	2	3	4	5	6	7	8	9	10	Final
Nova Scotia (Lake)	1	0	3	0	0	0	2	0	1	0	7
British Columbia (Zbeetnoff)	0	1	0	1	2	2	0	1	0	1	8

Sheet J	1	2	3	4	5	6	7	8	9	10	Final
Northwest Territories (Jefferson)	2	0	1	0	0	0	0	1	0	X	4
Northern Ontario (Scharf)	0	2	0	3	1	0	3	0	1	X	10

==== Draw 5 ====
Sheet C	1	2	3	4	5	6	7	8	9	10	Final
Yukon (Baldwin)	1	0	1	0	2	1	1	0	1	X	7
Manitoba (Gunnlaugson)	0	2	0	1	0	0	0	1	0	X	4

Sheet H	1	2	3	4	5	6	7	8	9	10	Final
British Columbia (Zbeetnoff)	0	2	3	1	0	0	2	X	X	X	8
Newfoundland (Strong)	0	0	0	0	1	0	0	X	X	X	1

Sheet J	1	2	3	4	5	6	7	8	9	10	Final
Alberta (Odegard)	0	1	2	3	0	1	0	1	0	X	8
Quebec (Lapierre)	0	0	0	0	1	0	1	0	1	X	3

==== Draw 6 ====
Sheet A	1	2	3	4	5	6	7	8	9	10	Final
Quebec (Lapierre)	1	1	0	1	3	0	4	X	X	X	10
Nova Scotia (Lake)	0	0	1	0	0	2	0	X	X	X	3

Sheet D	1	2	3	4	5	6	7	8	9	10	Final
New Brunswick (Robichaud)	0	2	0	2	1	1	0	0	0	0	6
Northwest Territories (Jefferson)	1	0	3	0	0	0	1	0	1	1	7

Sheet E	1	2	3	4	5	6	7	8	9	10	Final
Manitoba (Gunnlaugson)	0	2	0	0	0	0	0	1	X	X	3
Saskatchewan (Miller)	1	0	0	0	0	2	3	0	X	X	6

Sheet G	1	2	3	4	5	6	7	8	9	10	Final
Northern Ontario (Scharf)	0	0	1	0	0	0	0	2	0	2	5
Prince Edward Island (Gaudet)	1	0	0	0	2	0	0	0	1	0	4

Sheet J	1	2	3	4	5	6	7	8	9	10	11	12	Final
Ontario (Reddick)	0	0	0	1	1	1	1	0	0	0	0	1	5
Yukon (Baldwin)	0	0	0	0	0	0	0	2	1	1	0	0	4

==== Draw 7 ====
Sheet A	1	2	3	4	5	6	7	8	9	10	Final
Ontario (Reddick)	1	0	2	0	0	2	0	1	1	0	7
Newfoundland (Strong)	0	1	0	1	2	0	1	0	0	1	6

Sheet C	1	2	3	4	5	6	7	8	9	10	Final
Northwest Territories (Jefferson)	2	0	1	0	0	0	0	0	X	X	3
Quebec (Lapierre)	0	1	0	2	1	3	1	3	X	X	11

Sheet F	1	2	3	4	5	6	7	8	9	10	Final
Northern Ontario (Scharf)	0	0	0	0	1	0	1	1	0	2	5
Nova Scotia (Lake)	0	0	0	0	0	1	0	0	2	0	3

Sheet H	1	2	3	4	5	6	7	8	9	10	11	Final
Yukon (Baldwin)	0	2	1	0	0	0	2	0	0	1	0	6
New Brunswick (Robichaud)	1	0	0	1	0	1	0	2	1	0	1	7

==== Draw 8 ====
Sheet D	1	2	3	4	5	6	7	8	9	10	Final
Prince Edward Island (Gaudet)	1	0	1	2	0	1	0	1	1	X	7
British Columbia (Zbeetnoff)	0	2	0	0	1	0	0	0	0	X	3

Sheet F	1	2	3	4	5	6	7	8	9	10	Final
Manitoba (Gunnlaugson)	0	2	0	2	0	0	6	X	X	X	10
Northwest Territories (Jefferson)	0	0	1	0	1	0	0	X	X	X	2

Sheet G	1	2	3	4	5	6	7	8	9	10	Final
Newfoundland (Strong)	0	0	2	1	0	0	0	1	0	0	4
Saskatchewan (Miller)	0	0	0	0	1	1	1	0	0	2	5

Sheet I	1	2	3	4	5	6	7	8	9	10	Final
New Brunswick (Robichaud)	2	0	0	0	0	1	0	0	X	X	3
Alberta (Odegard)	0	0	2	2	1	0	0	4	X	X	9

==== Draw 9 ====
Sheet B	1	2	3	4	5	6	7	8	9	10	Final
Saskatchewan (Miller)	2	0	2	0	2	0	0	2	0	1	9
Northern Ontario (Scharf)	0	1	0	2	0	1	1	0	2	0	7

Sheet D	1	2	3	4	5	6	7	8	9	10	Final
Nova Scotia (Lake)	0	2	0	0	0	3	1	0	2	0	8
Yukon (Baldwin)	1	0	2	0	1	0	0	1	0	1	6

Sheet E	1	2	3	4	5	6	7	8	9	10	Final
Quebec (Lapierre)	0	0	2	0	1	0	0	1	0	0	4
Ontario (Reddick)	0	1	0	2	0	0	1	0	0	1	5

Sheet H	1	2	3	4	5	6	7	8	9	10	Final
Alberta (Odegard)	1	0	0	1	0	0	1	0	1	0	4
Prince Edward Island (Gaudet)	0	2	1	0	1	1	0	0	0	1	6

Sheet J	1	2	3	4	5	6	7	8	9	10	Final
British Columbia (Zbeetnoff)	1	0	0	1	0	0	0	1	0	X	3
Manitoba (Gunnlaugson)	0	2	1	0	2	1	1	0	2	X	9

==== Draw 10 ====
Sheet B	1	2	3	4	5	6	7	8	9	10	Final
Quebec (Lapierre)	1	1	0	0	0	1	0	1	0	X	4
British Columbia (Zbeetnoff)	0	0	1	1	3	0	4	0	1	X	10

Sheet C	1	2	3	4	5	6	7	8	9	10	Final
New Brunswick (Robichaud)	2	0	1	0	0	2	1	0	1	X	7
Northern Ontario (Scharf)	0	1	0	0	1	0	0	3	0	X	5

Sheet G	1	2	3	4	5	6	7	8	9	10	Final
Manitoba (Gunnlaugson)	0	0	0	2	0	0	1	0	X	X	3
Alberta (Odegard)	0	1	1	0	2	1	0	3	X	X	8

==== Draw 11 ====
Sheet B	1	2	3	4	5	6	7	8	9	10	Final
Alberta (Odegard)	0	1	0	1	1	0	1	0	2	2	8
Nova Scotia (Lake)	1	0	2	0	0	1	0	1	0	0	5

Sheet C	1	2	3	4	5	6	7	8	9	10	Final
Prince Edward Island (Gaudet)	3	0	0	1	0	0	1	0	1	X	6
Yukon (Baldwin)	0	1	0	0	1	1	0	1	0	X	4

Sheet E	1	2	3	4	5	6	7	8	9	10	Final
Newfoundland (Strong)	1	0	2	0	0	0	0	1	1	X	5
Northwest Territories (Jefferson)	0	1	0	0	1	0	1	0	0	X	3

Sheet H	1	2	3	4	5	6	7	8	9	10	11	Final
Saskatchewan (Miller)	0	2	0	2	1	0	0	0	0	1	0	6
Quebec (Lapierre)	2	0	3	0	0	0	0	0	1	0	2	8

Sheet I	1	2	3	4	5	6	7	8	9	10	11	Final
Northern Ontario (Scharf)	1	0	0	1	0	0	1	0	1	0	0	4
Ontario (Reddick)	0	1	0	0	1	0	0	1	0	1	1	5

==== Draw 12 ====
Sheet A	1	2	3	4	5	6	7	8	9	10	Final
Yukon (Baldwin)	2	0	1	0	2	0	0	1	0	0	6
Saskatchewan (Miller)	0	2	0	1	0	1	1	0	1	1	7

Sheet C	1	2	3	4	5	6	7	8	9	10	11	Final
Nova Scotia (Lake)	0	1	1	0	1	1	0	1	0	0	0	5
Newfoundland (Strong)	1	0	0	0	0	0	1	0	0	3	1	6

Sheet F	1	2	3	4	5	6	7	8	9	10	11	Final
Ontario (Reddick)	2	0	0	0	2	0	0	1	0	0	1	6
Manitoba (Gunnlaugson)	0	0	0	2	0	1	0	0	1	1	0	5

Sheet G	1	2	3	4	5	6	7	8	9	10	Final
British Columbia (Zbeetnoff)	1	0	1	0	0	1	0	1	0	X	4
New Brunswick (Robichaud)	0	0	0	2	1	0	1	0	2	X	6

Sheet I	1	2	3	4	5	6	7	8	9	10	Final
Northwest Territories (Jefferson)	0	0	0	0	0	0	0	X	X	X	0
Prince Edward Island (Gaudet)	0	1	4	1	0	2	1	X	X	X	9

==== Draw 13 ====
Sheet A	1	2	3	4	5	6	7	8	9	10	Final
Newfoundland (Strong)	1	0	1	1	1	0	2	0	0	0	6
Alberta (Odegard)	0	2	0	0	0	3	0	0	2	2	9

Sheet D	1	2	3	4	5	6	7	8	9	10	Final
Manitoba (Gunnlaugson)	0	0	1	0	1	0	0	4	0	5	11
Northern Ontario (Scharf)	1	1	0	1	0	2	1	0	1	0	7

Sheet G	1	2	3	4	5	6	7	8	9	10	Final
Saskatchewan (Miller)	0	0	0	0	0	2	0	2	0	X	4
Prince Edward Island (Gaudet)	0	0	0	1	2	0	2	0	1	X	6

Sheet I	1	2	3	4	5	6	7	8	9	10	Final
Yukon (Baldwin)	0	3	0	1	0	2	0	0	6	X	12
Northwest Territories (Jefferson)	0	0	1	0	1	0	1	1	0	X	4

==== Draw 14 ====
Sheet B	1	2	3	4	5	6	7	8	9	10	11	Final
Ontario (Reddick)	2	0	0	1	0	0	0	0	2	0	1	6
New Brunswick (Robichaud)	0	1	1	0	0	0	2	0	0	1	0	5

Sheet F	1	2	3	4	5	6	7	8	9	10	Final
Quebec (Lapierre)	0	0	0	5	2	0	1	1	X	X	9
Yukon (Baldwin)	0	0	1	0	0	1	0	0	X	X	2

Sheet H	1	2	3	4	5	6	7	8	9	10	Final
Nova Scotia (Lake)	3	0	1	0	2	0	0	0	1	X	7
Manitoba (Gunnlaugson)	0	2	0	4	0	0	2	3	0	X	11

Sheet I	1	2	3	4	5	6	7	8	9	10	Final
British Columbia (Zbeetnoff)	1	0	0	1	0	3	0	2	0	0	7
Saskatchewan (Miller)	0	1	2	0	1	0	2	0	0	2	8

==== Draw 15 ====
Sheet A	1	2	3	4	5	6	7	8	9	10	Final
Northwest Territories (Jefferson)	0	0	0	0	0	3	0	X	X	X	3
Nova Scotia (Lake)	1	2	1	1	2	0	3	X	X	X	10

Sheet C	1	2	3	4	5	6	7	8	9	10	Final
Alberta (Odegard)	2	0	1	0	0	0	2	0	1	0	6
Ontario (Reddick)	0	1	0	0	2	0	0	1	0	1	5

Sheet E	1	2	3	4	5	6	7	8	9	10	Final
Northern Ontario (Scharf)	1	2	1	0	1	0	0	0	1	X	6
British Columbia (Zbeetnoff)	0	0	0	1	0	6	3	0	0	X	10

Sheet H	1	2	3	4	5	6	7	8	9	10	Final
New Brunswick (Robichaud)	1	0	3	0	1	0	0	2	0	X	7
Quebec (Lapierre)	0	1	0	0	0	2	0	0	1	X	4

Sheet I	1	2	3	4	5	6	7	8	9	10	Final
Prince Edward Island (Gaudet)	1	0	2	0	1	0	1	0	0	1	6
Newfoundland (Strong)	0	2	0	1	0	0	0	0	1	0	4

==== Draw 16 ====
Sheet C	1	2	3	4	5	6	7	8	9	10	Final
British Columbia (Zbeetnoff)	2	0	2	1	2	0	0	1	0	X	8
Northwest Territories (Jefferson)	0	1	0	0	0	2	1	0	2	X	6

Sheet E	1	2	3	4	5	6	7	8	9	10	Final
Saskatchewan (Miller)	2	0	0	2	0	1	1	0	2	1	9
Nova Scotia (Lake)	0	1	1	0	2	0	0	3	0	0	7

Sheet G	1	2	3	4	5	6	7	8	9	10	Final
Yukon (Baldwin)	0	0	1	0	2	2	0	1	0	0	6
Alberta (Odegard)	0	1	0	1	0	0	3	0	1	1	7

Sheet I	1	2	3	4	5	6	7	8	9	10	11	Final
Manitoba (Gunnlaugson)	0	0	2	2	0	0	2	0	0	0	2	8
Quebec (Lapierre)	0	1	0	0	2	1	0	0	1	1	0	6

==== Draw 17 ====
Sheet B	1	2	3	4	5	6	7	8	9	10	Final
Northern Ontario (Scharf)	3	0	0	2	2	0	2	0	4	X	13
Yukon (Baldwin)	0	1	1	0	0	1	0	2	0	X	5

Sheet D	1	2	3	4	5	6	7	8	9	10	Final
Quebec (Lapierre)	0	0	1	2	2	0	0	2	1	X	8
Newfoundland (Strong)	0	1	0	0	0	1	0	0	0	X	2

Sheet E	1	2	3	4	5	6	7	8	9	10	Final
New Brunswick (Robichaud)	0	0	0	1	0	1	0	0	1	X	3
Prince Edward Island (Gaudet)	0	1	0	0	1	0	2	1	0	X	5

Sheet H	1	2	3	4	5	6	7	8	9	10	Final
Northwest Territories (Jefferson)	2	0	0	0	0	0	0	1	0	X	3
Ontario (Reddick)	0	0	0	2	1	2	3	0	2	X	10

==== Draw 18 ====
Sheet B	1	2	3	4	5	6	7	8	9	10	Final
Prince Edward Island (Gaudet)	0	2	0	2	0	4	0	0	1	X	9
Manitoba (Gunnlaugson)	2	0	1	0	1	0	2	1	0	X	7

Sheet D	1	2	3	4	5	6	7	8	9	10	Final
Ontario (Reddick)	0	2	0	2	1	0	1	0	3	X	9
Saskatchewan (Miller)	1	0	2	0	0	2	0	1	0	X	6

Sheet F	1	2	3	4	5	6	7	8	9	10	Final
Alberta (Odegard)	1	0	2	0	0	1	0	1	1	1	7
British Columbia (Zbeetnoff)	0	3	0	1	0	0	2	0	0	0	6

Sheet H	1	2	3	4	5	6	7	8	9	10	Final
Newfoundland (Strong)	1	0	0	0	0	0	0	0	2	1	4
Northern Ontario (Scharf)	0	1	1	1	0	1	0	1	0	0	5

Sheet J	1	2	3	4	5	6	7	8	9	10	Final
Nova Scotia (Lake)	1	1	0	1	1	3	4	X	X	X	11
New Brunswick (Robichaud)	0	0	1	0	0	0	0	X	X	X	1

=== Playoffs ===
Semifinal		Final
Saskatchewan	6
Alberta	4	Prince Edward Island	5
		Saskatchewan	7

==== Semifinal ====
Sheet G	1	2	3	4	5	6	7	8	9	10	Final
Saskatchewan (Miller)	1	0	1	0	0	0	1	2	0	1	6
Alberta (Odegard)	0	1	0	0	2	0	0	0	1	0	4

Player percentages
Saskatchewan		Alberta	
Amanda MacDonald	84%	Natalie Morgan	75%
Stacy Helm	88%	Jennifer Vejprava	73%
Marliese Miller	95%	Suzie Iskiw	78%
Stefanie Miller	90%	Tiffany Odegard	81%
Total	89%	Total	77%

==== Final ====
Sheet B	1	2	3	4	5	6	7	8	9	10	Final
Prince Edward Island (Gaudet)	1	0	0	0	1	0	0	0	3	0	5
Saskatchewan (Miller)	0	0	0	2	0	0	2	2	0	1	7

Player percentages
Prince Edward Island		Saskatchewan	
Kelly Higgins	89%	Amanda MacDonald	89%
Robyn MacPhee	86%	Stacy Helm	76%
Stefanie Richard	75%	Marliese Miller	94%
Suzanne Gaudet	76%	Stefanie Miller	86%
Total	82%	Total	86%

== Qualification ==
=== Ontario ===
The Teranet Ontario Junior Curling Championships were held at the Bobcaygeon Curling Club in Bobcaygeon January 11–16.

Julie Reddick of Oakville defeated Jenn Hanna of Ottawa 9-3 in the women's final. Hanna had finished in the round tied for third with Carrie Lindner of Bradford. She beat Lindner in the tiebreaker 6-5 and Chrissy Cadorin of St. Catharines in the semifinal 8-6.

In the men's final, Jason Young of Burlington defeated Jamie Farnell of Bradford 7-5.
