= Columbia Wetlands =

Wetlands and Ramsar site of Canada

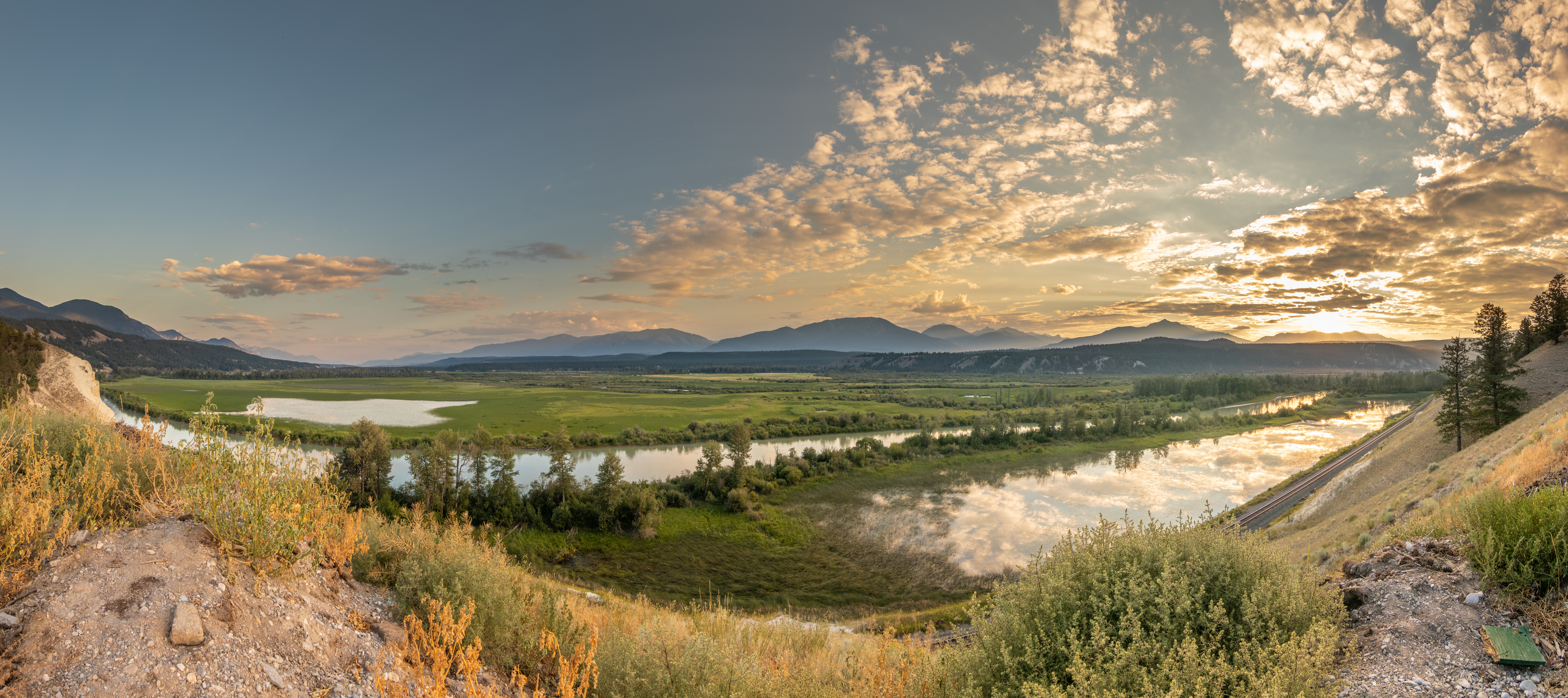
- The Columbia Wetlands from highway 95
- Interactive map of Columbia Wetlands
- Nearest city: Canal Flats
- Coordinates: 50°10′N 115°50′W
- Area: 169.69 square kilometres (65.52 sq mi)

Ramsar Wetland
- Designated: 5 June 2005
- Reference no.: 1463

The Columbia Wetlands is a 16,969 hectare wetland in the Columbia Valley region of southeastern British Columbia, Canada. It was designated a wetland of international importance on World Environment Day, June 5, 2005, and is the thirty-seventh such site in Canada. The wetland satisfies all the inclusion criteria of the Ramsar Convention. It is maintained by the Columbia Wetlands Wildlife Management Area (CWWMA, designated in 1996) and administered by the Canadian Wildlife Service. It is also part of the Living Lakes Network.

It is "one of the longest intact wetlands in North America", is the headwaters for the Columbia River system, and "comprises a regionally unparalleled diversity".

Part of the wetlands is protected by the Columbia Lake Ecological Reserve at the southeast end of the lake. Columbia Lake Provincial Park is on the northeast end of the lake.

"The Columbia Wetlands WMA encompasses the Columbia River, extending 180 km from the headwaters of Columbia Lake near Canal Flats to the head of the Mica Reservoir just north of Donald in the Rocky Mountain Trench."

== Fauna and flora ==
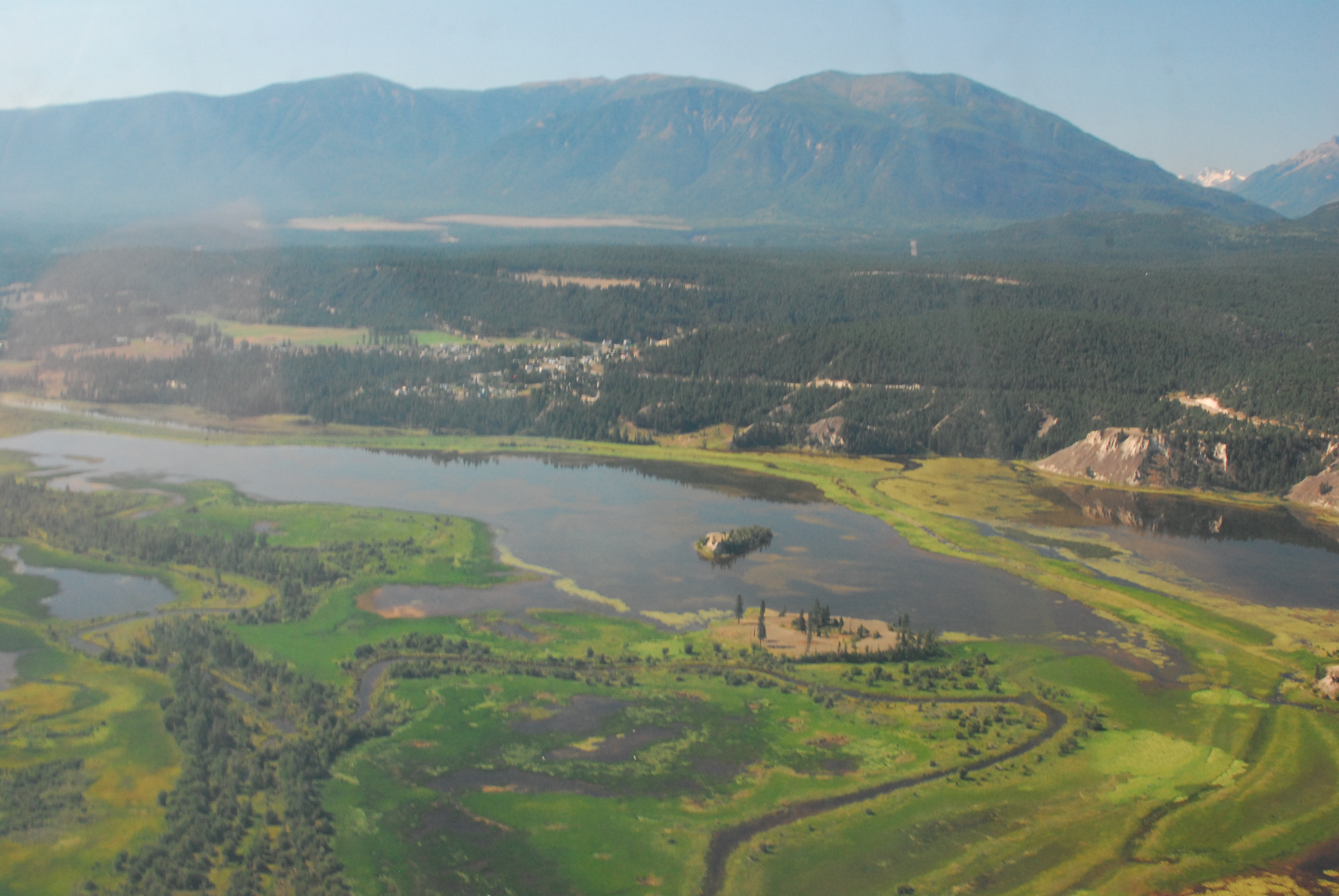
Columbia Wetlands from the air

The extensive wetland provides habitat for several endangered species, including the peregrine falcon and American badger.
