= Templeton River =

Location
- Country: Canada
- Province: British Columbia
- District: Kootenay Land District

Physical characteristics
- Source: Templeton Lake
  - location: Southeast of Golden
  - coordinates: 50°47′21″N 116°34′19″W
  - elevation: 6,407 ft (1,953 m)
- Mouth: Columbia River (via Columbia Wetlands)
  - location: Upstream from the mouth of the Spillimacheen River

The Templeton River is a 21-kilometre (13 mi) long river in British Columbia. It is a tributary of the Columbia River, entering the Columbia via the Columbia Wetlands, upstream from the mouth of the Spillimacheen River.

== Course ==
The Templeton River begins at the outlet of remote Templeton Lake. There are a good-sized set of cascades and waterfalls just below the lake outlet. The river flows in a northeastern direction for about 11.7 km before entering small Lang Lake, which was, prior to May 12, 1965, known as Longs Lake. After exiting Lang Lake, the river moves northeast again, this time for only 1.7 kilometres (1.1 mi) before changing its direction to southeast and flowing that way for about 7.6 kilometres (4.7 mi) before picking up its only officially named tributary, Dunbar Creek, after which it empties into the Columbia River.

== See also ==
- List of rivers of British Columbia
