= Jason Young (curler) =

Canadian curler

Medal record

World Junior Curling Championships
Gold medal – first place	1999 Östersund	

Jason "Jay" Young (born September 20, 1979) is a Canadian curler from Wyoming, Ontario. Young is a former World Junior Curling champion.

In 1999, Young joined the World Junior champion John Morris rink from the Ottawa Curling Club. He replaced Andy Ormsby in the second position. The team won the 1999 Canadian Junior Curling Championships and 1999 World Junior Curling Championships for the second straight year, but the first title for Young. The following season, Young formed his own team, and won his second Junior championships. At the Canadian Juniors that year, the team finished 9–3, but lost in a tiebreaker to Saskatchewan.

Young also won the provincial junior mixed title in 1998, and the provincial schoolboy title in 1998.

After juniors, Young played for Heath McCormick and then Chad Allen before forming his own team in 2008.
