= Templeton Lake =

- Location within British Columbia
- Location: Kootenay Land District, British Columbia, Canada
- Coordinates: 50.7889°N 116.5748°W
- Type: lake
- Primary outflows: Templeton River

Templeton Lake is the head of Templeton River, in the Kootenay Land District of British Columbia, Canada.

== See also ==
- List of lakes of British Columbia
