= Columbia Lake Ecological Reserve =

Nature reserve in British Columbia, Canada

Coordinates: 50°12′00″N 115°49′26″W

Columbia Lake Ecological Reserve is a nature reserve on Columbia Lake in the East Kootenay region of British Columbia, Canada, located on the east side of Columbia Lake just north of the village of Canal Flats.

The reserve was created in 1971, comprising approximately 60 acres. Its boundary was extended, increasing its approximate area to 80 acres, in 1972. In 2004, its area was reduced to approximately 21 hectares.

The reserve is in the Interior Douglas-fir zone and protects some of the Columbia Wetlands.

== See also ==
- Columbia Lake Provincial Park
