= Hailey Birnie =

Canadian curler (born 1982)

- Curler
- Born: July 11, 1982 (age 44); Whitehorse, Yukon

Team
- Curling club: Whitehorse CC, Whitehorse, YT
- Skip: Hailey Birnie
- Third: Chelsea Jarvis
- Second: Kerry Campbell
- Lead: Kimberly Tuor
- Alternate: Jenna Duncan

Curling career
- Member Association: Yukon
- Hearts: 4 (2019, 2020, 2022, 2023)
- Top CTRS ranking: 115th (2021–22)

Hailey Dawn Birnie (born July 11, 1982) is a Canadian curler and actress from Whitehorse, Yukon. She currently skips her own team out of the Whitehorse Curling Club.

== Curling career ==
While in juniors, Birnie made four appearances at the Canadian Junior Curling Championships in 1998, 1999, 2000 and 2001, all as second for Nicole Baldwin. In their first two appearances, the team posted their best records, finishing 6–6 in both 1998 and 1999. Their worst performance came in 2000 where they went 3–9, finishing in twelfth place. Their final showing in 2001 saw them finish in ninth with a 5–7 record.

Birnie's next curling success wouldn't come until 2019 when she won the Yukon Scotties Tournament of Hearts. Her team, with skip Nicole Baldwin, second Ladene Shaw and lead Helen Strong represented the Yukon at the 2019 Scotties Tournament of Hearts in Sydney, Nova Scotia. There, they finished with a 1–6 record, beating the Northwest Territories' Kerry Galusha rink 13–6 in Draw 14.

The following season, Birnie returned to the Scotties, skipping her own team of Chelsea Duncan, Gabrielle Plonka, Kimberly Tuor and Rhonda Horte. Through their seven games, the team finished with a winless 0–7 record. After not competing in 2021, Birnie won the Yukon Scotties championship in 2022, defeating the defending champions Team Laura Eby 2–0 in the best-of-three qualifier series. The team finished 0–8 at the 2022 Scotties Tournament of Hearts in Thunder Bay, Ontario.

Team Birnie competed in one tour event during the 2022–23 season, the King Cash Spiel in Maple Ridge, British Columbia. Through the round robin, the team finished with a 3–1 record, qualifying for the playoffs. They then lost to British Columbia's Shawna Jensen in the semifinal. At the 2023 Scotties Tournament of Hearts, Birnie led the Yukon to a 1–7 round robin record. In their sole win, the team upset Wild Card #2's Casey Scheidegger 10–3.

== Acting ==
Birnie is also an actress, and has appeared on such television shows as Supernatural and Smallville.

== Personal life ==
Birnie is employed as a mental health counsellor and a film producer.

== Teams ==
Season	Skip	Third	Second	Lead
1997–98	Nicole Baldwin	Jaime Milward	Hailey Birnie	Jaime Hewitt
1998–99	Nicole Baldwin	Jaime Milward	Hailey Birnie	Jaime Hewitt
1999–00	Nicole Baldwin	Jaime Milward	Hailey Birnie	Tia-Jayne Clark
2000–01	Nicole Baldwin	Lindsay Moffatt	Hailey Birnie	Naomi Hales
2018–19	Nicole Baldwin	Hailey Birnie	Ladene Shaw	Helen Strong
2019–20	Hailey Birnie	Chelsea Duncan	Gabrielle Plonka	Kimberly Tuor
2021–22	Hailey Birnie	Patty Wallingham	Kerry Campbell	Kimberly Tuor
2022–23	Hailey Birnie	Chelsea Jarvis	Kerry Campbell	Kimberly Tuor
