= Global Nature Fund =

Private non profit foundation

Global Nature Fund, established in 1998, is a private non-profit foundation with the stated goal of protecting the environment. It is headquartered in Radolfzell, Germany.

The organization, which sponsors the Living Lakes Network, marks World Wetlands Day annually by designating a water body as "Threatened Lake of the Year". In 2004 it signed a Memorandum of Cooperation with Ramsar.

== Threatened Lake of the Year ==
- 2004 Lake Chapala:Mexico
- 2005 Lake Victoria: Kenya, Tanzania and Uganda
- 2006 Dead Sea: Jordan, Israel and Palestine
- 2007 Pantanal: Brazil, Paraguay and Bolivia
- 2008 Mahakam Wetland: Indonesia
- 2009 Lake Atitlán: Guatemala
- 2010 Pulicat Lake: India
- 2011 Laguna de Fúquene: Colombia
- 2012 Lake Titicaca, Peru and Bolivia
- 2013 Lake Winnipeg: Canada
- 2014 Lake Sampaloc, Philippines
- 2015 Lake Hovsgol, Mongolia
- 2016 Tonle Sap Lake, Cambodia
- 2017 Lake Tanganyika, Burundi, Democratic Republic of the Congo, Tanzania and Zambia
- 2018 Lake Bolgoda and Lake Madampe, Sri Lanka
- 2019 Lake Nokoué, Benin
- 2020 Albufera Lake, Spain
- 2021 Pantanal Wetlands, Brazil, Bolivia, Paraguay
- 2022 Lake Malawi, Malawi, Mozambique and Tanzania
- 2023 Lake Titicaca, Bolivia, Peru
