= Living Lakes Network =

International environmental network

The Living Lakes is an international network program managed by the Global Nature Fund (GNF) to enhance the protection, restoration and rehabilitation of freshwater lakes worldwide. GNF seeks the partnership of decision makers, communities and businesses to conserve the water quality and biodiversity of these wetlands through sustainable use and development, thereby also ensuring the reservoirs of drinking water.

The Living Lakes Network currently has 29 member lakes and 27 associates.

== Network members ==
- Lake Baikal, Russia
- Lake Balaton, Hungary
- Lake Biwa, Japan
- Lake Constance, Germany, Switzerland & Austria
- Bolgoda Lake, Sri Lanka
- Lake Chapala, Mexico
- The Broads, United Kingdom
- Columbia River Wetlands, Canada
- La Nava, Spain
- Laguna de Bay, Philippines
- Laguna Fúquene, Colombia
- Maduganga & Madampe, Sri Lanka
- Mahakam Wetland, Indonesia
- Mar Chiquita, Argentina
- Milicz Ponds, Poland
- Mono Lake, United States
- Nestos Lakes, Greece
- Paliastomi Lake, Georgia
- Pantanal, Brazil, Bolivia, Paraguay
- Peipsi / Chudskoe & Võrtsjärv, Estonia & Russia
- Poyang, China
- St. Lucia, South Africa
- Tengiz Lake, Kazakhstan
- Lake Titicaca, Bolivia & Peru
- The Dead Sea, Israel, Jordan & Palestine
- Lake Trasimeno, Italy
- Uluabat Lake, Turkey
- Lake Victoria, Kenya, Tanzania & Uganda
- Vostok, Antarctica - honorary member

=== Candidate members ===
- Laguna de Rocha, Uruguay
- Lagunita Complex, Paraguay

== Associated members ==
- Albufera, Spain
- Amatitlan, Guatemala
- Atitlan, Guatemala
- Atotonilco, Mexico
- Bolsena, Italy
- Enriquillo & Azuéi, Dominican Republic & Haiti
- Garda, Italy
- Issyk-Kul, Kyrgyzstan
- Kolindsund, Denmark
- Labanoras, Lithuania
- Lago Maggiore, Italy
- Lake District, United Kingdom
- Mar Menor, Spain
- Mindelsee, Germany
- Okavango Delta, Botswana
- Orta, Italy
- Piediluco, Italy
- Pulicat, India
- Rio Gallegos, Argentina
- Salobrar de Campos, Spain
- Sampaloc, Philippines
- Sapanca, Turkey
- Taal, Philippines
- Uvs, Mongolia
- Vico, Italy
- Wilson Inlet, Australia
- Wular Lake, India
