= Kärcher =

German cleaning equipment and systems company

Alfred Kärcher SE & Co. KG
- Trade name: Kärcher
- Type: Private (SE & Co. KG)
- Industry: Manufacturing
- Founded: 2 January 1935; 91 years ago
- Founder: Alfred Kärcher
- Headquarters: Winnenden, Germany
- Area served: Worldwide
- Key people: Hartmut Jenner (CEO); Christian May (CSO); Markus Limberger (COO); Stefan Patzke (CFO); Marco Cardinale (CTO)
- Products: Cleaning equipment, full cleaning systems
- Revenue: €3.44 billion (2024)
- Number of employees: 17,000 (2024)
- Subsidiaries: Kärcher Futuretech, Kärcher New Venture, Kärcher Industrial Vacuuming, Kärcher Municipal, WOMA, Zoi, interpool, SoniQ Services
- Website: www.kaercher.com

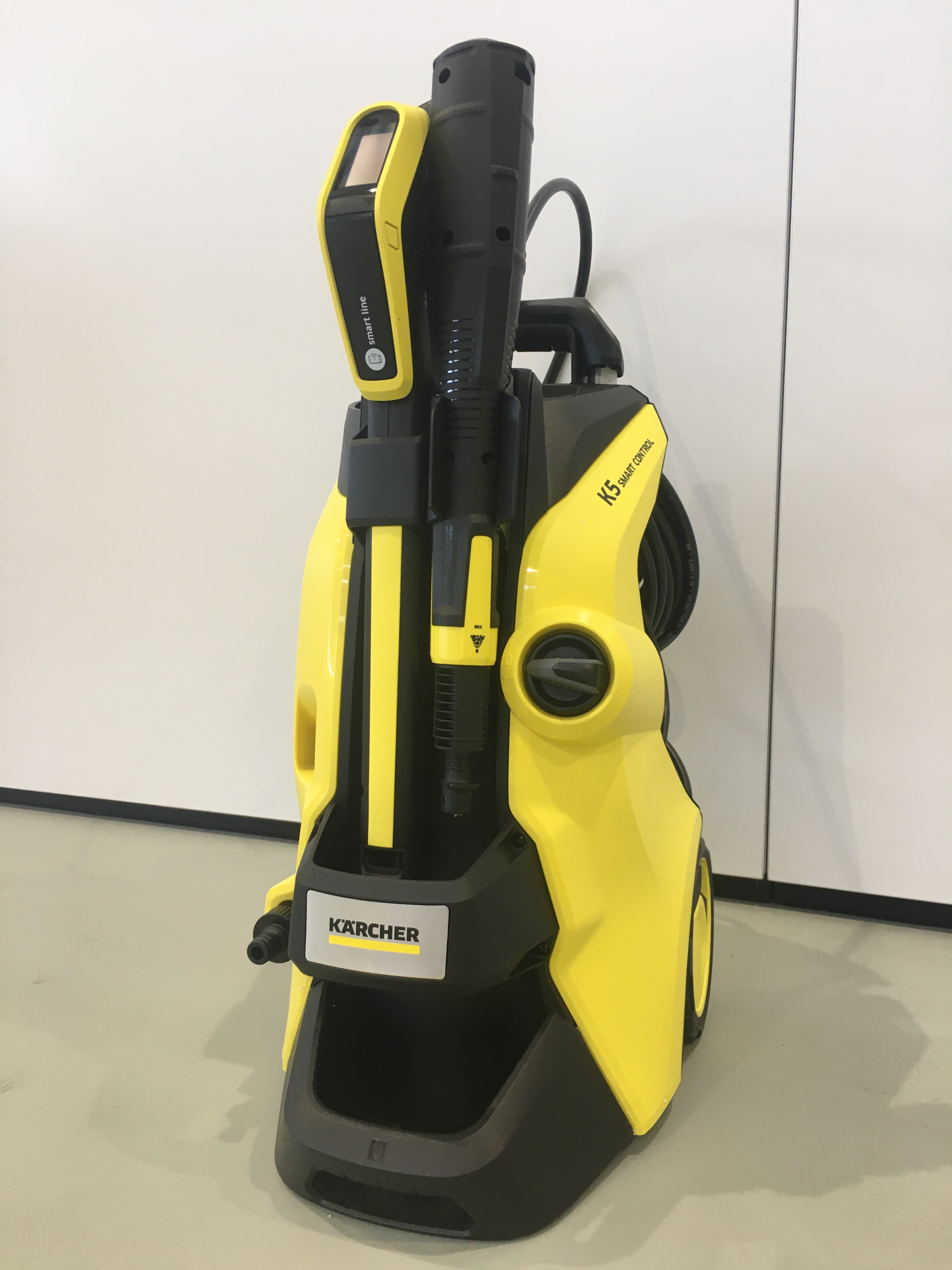
Kärcher high-pressure cleaner

Kärcher SE & Co. KG is a German manufacturer of cleaning equipment and systems, headquartered in Winnenden, Baden-Württemberg. Kärcher is considered the global market leader in this segment and, as of 2024, operates in 170 companies across 85 countries.

The company employs 17,000 people worldwide and in 2024 it posted sales revenues of € 3.44 billion.

== History ==
=== Beginnings in Stuttgart and the war period ===
In 1924, after graduating from the Technical University of Stuttgart, Alfred Kärcher (1901-1959) joined his father's business, which sold industrial cooking and laundry equipment in Stuttgart's Bad Cannstatt district. In the following years, Alfred Kärcher began to develop equipment such as electric immersion heaters and crucible furnaces for industrial use, which became the basis for founding his own company. In 1935, he founded the Alfred Kärcher Kommanditgesellschaft in Bad Cannstatt; his father Emil was a partner until his death.

One of the first commercial successes was a salt bath furnace for the energy-saving hardening and refining of light metals. Kärcher, whose company had only limited production capacities of its own at the time, sold the patent for this to Siebert GmbH in Frankfurt am Main. Over 1,200 units of the system were sold by 1945, primarily in the aviation industry.

Due to lack of space, 120 employees moved to Winnenden in 1939, where the company has been headquartered ever since.

At the beginning of the World War II, the company was involved in the defence industry and produced cabin heaters and devices for de-icing wings and tail units for the Luftwaffe, among other things. As early as 1934, Alfred Kärcher had developed petrol-powered hot air blowers on behalf of Lufthansa, which were used to preheat aircraft engines in winter to facilitate starting. During World War II, these mobile heaters were also used by the Wehrmacht to preheat engines and prisoners of war were used in production. Kärcher had a Russian camp, a Polish camp, a French camp and the Ruitzenmühle camp.

In the immediate post-war period, Kärcher mainly built products such as cookers, small cookers, handcarts and trailers for the population. Later, heatable concrete formwork and fresh air heaters were also manufactured, which were intended for reconstruction work in the cities destroyed by the war. In 1948, the company was commissioned to repair the steam cleaners of the United States Army.

=== 1950–1989: Irene Kärcher, internationalisation of the company ===
In 1950, the cleaning technology division was established with the development of the first European hot water high-pressure cleaner, the DS 350. From the mid-1950s to the 1970s, the production of steam generators for industry and construction was a key focus for the company, while cleaning technology only later became Kärcher's main revenue-generating sector.

On 17 September 1959, Alfred Kärcher died at the age of 58 from a heart attack. He left behind his wife, Irene Kärcher (1920–1989), and their two children, Johannes and Susanne. Irene Kärcher then took over responsibility for the family-run business. Under her leadership, the company's revenue increased by 70 percent in the first year. In 1962, the first sales company outside Germany was established in a small suburb of Paris, followed by further sales companies in Austria and Switzerland.

In the 1960s and 1970s, the company expanded internationally. During this time, Kärcher's product range included construction formwork, toys, and catamaran boats, before the company began focusing primarily on high-pressure cleaners from 1974 onwards. In 1974, the corporate colour was changed from blue to yellow, and the focus shifted entirely to high-pressure cleaners, which were now manufactured in yellow. In 1975, Kärcher opened its first production facility outside Germany, in Brazil. Since the late 1970s, Kärcher has undertaken cleaning projects on artworks and historic buildings worldwide. In 1984, the first high-pressure cleaner for private use was launched in retail stores.

In 1989, Irene Kärcher died after three decades of leading the company. Following her death, the hired management team already in place took over the leadership of the company. Alfred and Irene Kärcher's children and grandchildren remain involved in the business, including serving on the supervisory board.

=== From the 1990s: New business areas, takeover of other companies ===
In the 1990s, Kärcher increasingly entered the business areas of commercial floor cleaning and municipal technology. In the private cleaning sector, the company launched various appliances such as hoovers and steam cleaners onto the market. In 2003, Kärcher launched its first fully autonomous cleaning robot for consumers, after which the company focused more on robotics. In the mid-2000s, Kärcher also expanded into the gardening sector and began producing garden pumps.

At the end of 2011, the company purchased the site of the former Pfleiderer brickworks in Winnenden, which nearly doubled the operational area. In September 2012, the old brickworks was demolished, and construction began on an expansion for Kärcher. In September 2014, a new office building for 700 employees and an event building for up to 800 people were opened on the site. Since 2016, a new customer centre has been in operation in Winnenden. The complex is connected to the existing location by a bridge over the intervening railway tracks.

Since the 2000s, Kärcher has invested in various companies. In early 2011, Kärcher acquired the Swedish municipal technology provider Belos. In 2017, Kärcher established its own IT consultancy, Zoi TechCon GmbH. At the end of September 2019, Kärcher announced that it had acquired all business shares of Max Holder GmbH in Reutlingen, a manufacturer of municipal vehicles and vineyard tractors. Since January 2021, Max Holder GmbH has operated under the newly established Kärcher Municipal GmbH. In 2020, Kärcher established its North American headquarters in Aurora, Colorado.

In 2022, the first autonomous sweeper and scrubber dryer for professional use Kira was launched on the market. In January 2022, the brand once again asked 'political figures and the media to immediately cease all use of its brand name in the political sphere' after Valérie Pécresse also used the name Kärcher during the presidential campaign to illustrate the fight against insecurity.

In the 2024 review of WIPO's annual World Intellectual Property Indicators, Kärcher ranked 10th in the world, with 189 designs in industrial design registrations being published under the Hague System during 2023.

== Corporate structure ==
=== Kärcher main company ===
Alfred Kärcher SE & Co. KG is the parent company of the Kärcher Group, which has over 160 subsidiaries. In 2023, the Kärcher Group had a total of around 16,000 employees worldwide and generated a turnover of around €3.29 billion.

Hartmut Jenner has been Chairman of the Executive Board of Kärcher since 2000.

==== Locations / Sites ====
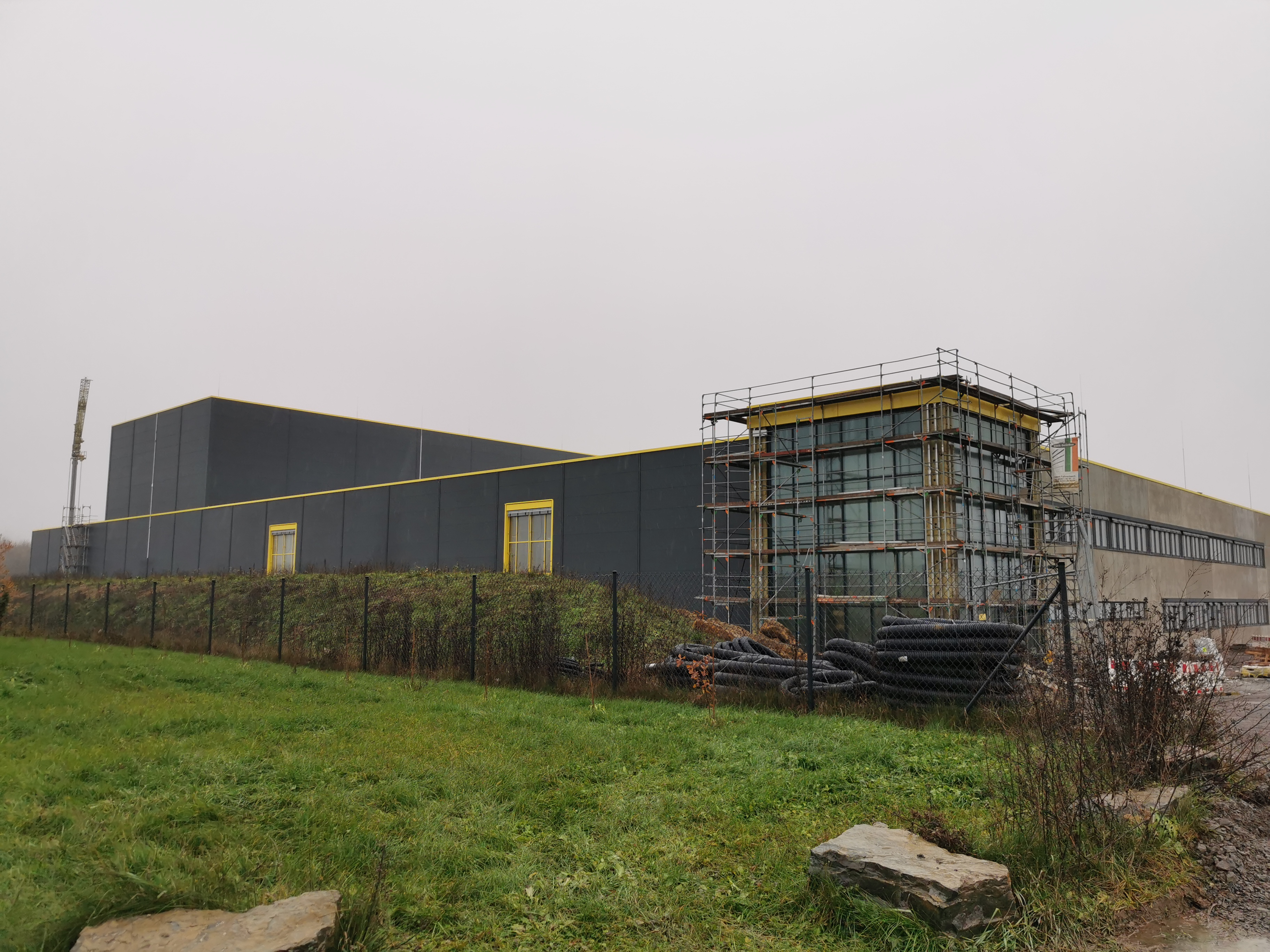
Kärcher Service Centre in Ahorn during the construction phase, 2022

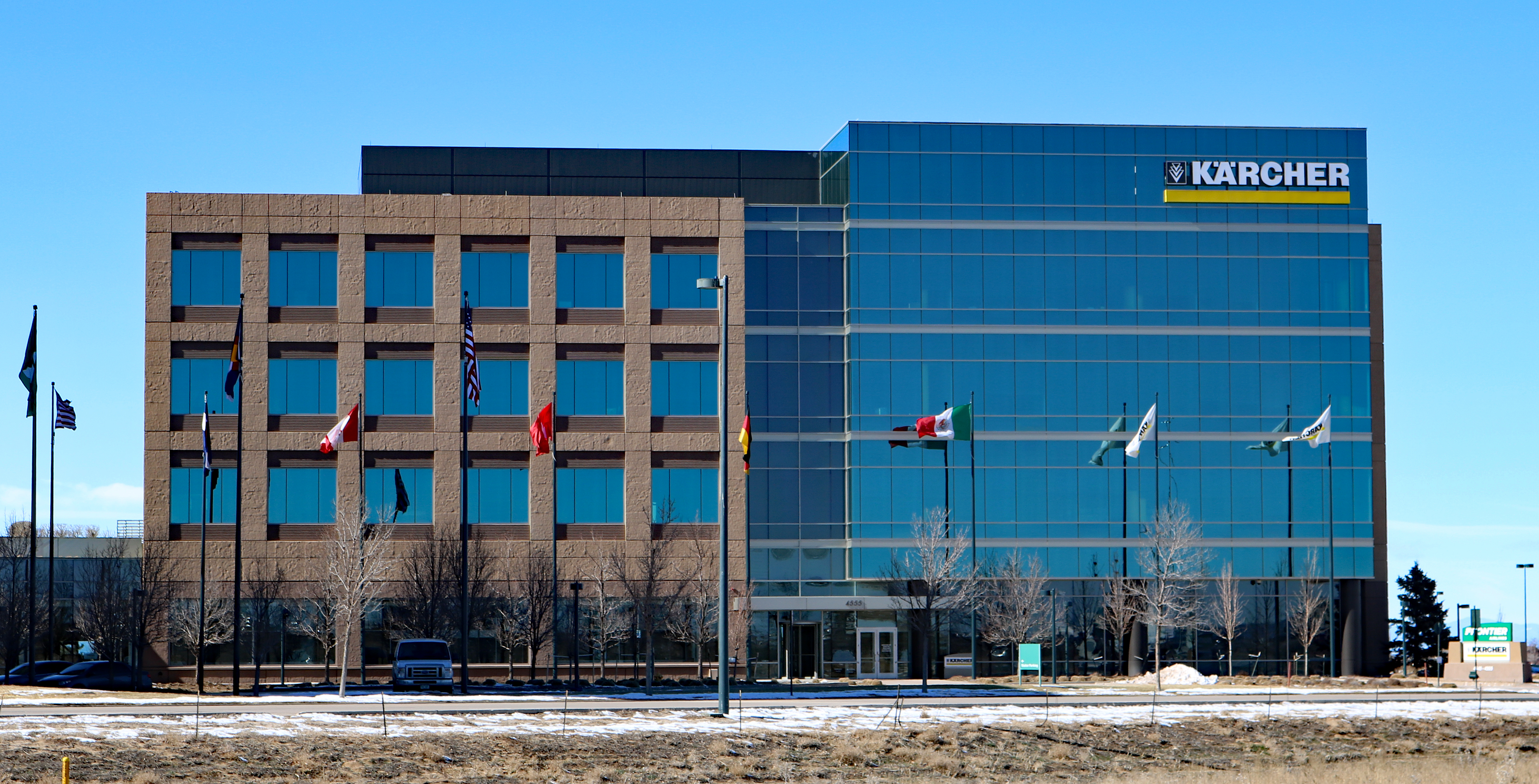
Kärcher's North American headquarters in Aurora

Kärcher's headquarters is located in Winnenden, near Stuttgart. The approximately 150,000 square meters of space houses not only the main administration and central departments but also the research and development for all product groups. Additionally, a museum dedicated to the company's history is situated in Winnenden.

There are three units at the site in the municipality of Obersontheim in Baden-Württemberg:

- The Obersontheim plant was established in 1965. It manufactures, among other things, professional municipal sweepers. Additionally, sheet metal processing is carried out there, supplying other plants with metal components. Equipment and systems from the subsidiary Futuretech are also produced at this location. Furthermore, the production of cleaning agents at the nearby Sulzdorf facility is linked to the Obersontheim plant. At the Obersontheim plant, individual components are coated in the coating facility.
- The Bühlertal plant mainly manufactures products for consumers such as high-pressure cleaners, steam cleaners and hoovers.
- The logistics centre near Obersontheim supplies Kärcher's global subsidiaries and their regional distribution centres. Within Europe, it also directly delivers accessories and spare parts to customers and dealers in over 20 countries. Additionally, the Obersontheim logistics centre manages parts of Kärcher's global logistics operations. At the end of 2022, a major extension of the logistics centre, costing €15 million, was inaugurated to accommodate the increased order volume of the company.

At the plant in Illingen, small series and custom manufacturing have been carried out since 1983. Additionally, switch cabinets, cable harnesses, and portal washing systems are also produced there. The closure of the plant is planned for early 2027. In Waldstetten, industrial vacuums are manufactured.

The Ahorn Service Centre in the Main-Tauber-Kreis has been in operation since 2023; previously, it was located in the neighbouring municipality of Gissigheim since 1992. This centre services and repairs consumer devices as well as smaller commercial products from across Central Europe. The 10,000-square-metre facility in Ahorn repairs approximately 200,000 devices each year.

In addition, Kärcher operates various business offices worldwide. In 2015, the company headquarters for North America was inaugurated in Aurora, Colorado. Other international production and logistics sites include Monterrey in Mexico, Vinhedo in Brazil, and Changshu in China.

=== Subsidiaries ===
As of 2023, Kärcher had over 160 subsidiaries in 82 countries.

==== Kärcher New Venture ====
Through Kärcher New Venture GmbH, based in Winnenden, the company invests venture capital in start-up companies, particularly those working on innovations in product, material, or service areas that Kärcher views as having future potential. Investments have been made in start-ups such as Mitte (mineralisation of tap water), Skyline Robotics (automated window cleaning), and Zan Compute (AI-based analysis platform for building management). The Kärcher New Venture team regularly participates in events such as the new.new Festival in Stuttgart.

==== Kärcher Futuretech ====
Kärcher Futuretech develops and manufactures systems for decontamination, water supply, mobile catering, and field camps for both military and civilian applications. For instance, these systems were deployed in Senegal in 2015 and after the earthquake in Nepal. Additionally, the company offers global logistics services and training. In developing its systems, Kärcher Futuretech leverages the expertise of its parent company in burner and high-pressure technology. In April 2020, Kärcher Futuretech received a contract from the Bundeswehr for the delivery of up to 400 modular field kitchens. According to the CEO, this was the largest order in Kärcher's history at that time.

==== Kärcher Industrial Vacuuming ====
Kärcher Industrial Vacuuming GmbH (formerly Ringler GmbH until the end of 2021), based in Waldstetten, develops and produces industrial and safety vacuums, dust extraction systems, as well as stationary extraction and central chip removal systems for various industrial needs.

The company originated from Ringler GmbH, founded in 1967 by Bernhard Ringler. The company became one of the leading manufacturers of industrial vacuums in Germany. When Bernhard Ringler sought a successor for his company, he sold it to the Kärcher Group in 2010. Under Kärcher's ownership, the number of employees increased from 29 to 72 by the 50th anniversary in 2017.

Since January 2020, all products are offered in anthracite colour, and an expansion of the production facility in Waldstetten was announced in the same year.

==== WOMA ====
WOMA GmbH, based in Duisburg, employs around 150 people as of 2024 and is a manufacturer of high-pressure water jet products, such as high-pressure pumps.

The Duisburg-based company was founded in 1962 by Wolfgang Maasberg and has been part of the Kärcher Group since 2011. Its product range includes high-pressure pumps and units with pressures of up to 3000 bar, as well as water tools for lower pressures. High-pressure water jet technology is used for the removal of paints and coatings, the repair of concrete, the cleaning of containers, and the precise cutting of metal.

==== Zoi ====
Zoi TechCon GmbH was founded in July 2017 and employs approximately 500 people across Stuttgart, Berlin,Cologne, Barcelona, Las Palmas, Sevilla, New York, Lisbon, Ho Chi Minh City, and other locations. Zoi is active in the development of digital applications, cloud transformation, and data projects, as well as electrical engineering and design. Its goal is to support globally operating mid-sized companies and large corporations in their digital transformation with new technologies, and to integrate existing enterprise IT and cloud systems.

==== Kärcher Municipal ====
Kärcher Municipal GmbH has operated as a legally independent division within the Kärcher Group since 2021, based in Reutlingen with over 200 employees. Before this, the company was active under the name Max Holder (formerly including Gebrüder Holder GmbH and Holder Maschinenbau GmbH) until its acquisition. The company, founded in 1888, had become well-known around the turn of the 20th century for its self-propelled plant protection sprayers.

Kärcher Municipal GmbH serves customers in the municipal technology sector, providing machinery for street cleaning, mowing, and snow removal.

== Products ==
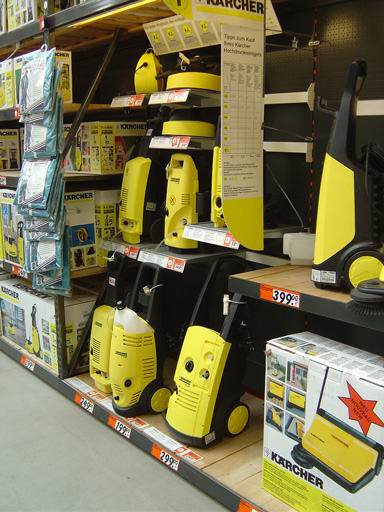
Kärcher products in a shop in Germany

Kärcher holds 718 active patents (as of 2024). The company offers products for both private and commercial use. The so-called Home & Garden products for private users are yellow, while the Professional products for commercial use are in anthracite. This colour coding was introduced in 2013 to better differentiate between private and commercial equipment. Since 2024, Kärcher's indoor products intended for home use are produced in white.

The company gained prominence mainly through its high-pressure cleaners. Its product range includes other cleaning devices for various applications, such as hard floor cleaners, steam vacuums, steam cleaners, scrubber-dryers, and sweepers for floor cleaning. The Kira product line offers autonomous dryers in various sizes. Kärcher also manufactures battery-powered window cleaners and electric ice scrapers. Additionally, Kärcher provides garden and submersible pressure pumps, irrigation systems, water purification systems, and washing equipment. Besides cleaning devices, the company offers cleaning and maintenance products, detergents and accessories.

== Common noun ==
In some countries such as Germany, France, Poland, Russia, Georgia, Mexico, Spain and the United States, the term "Kärcher" is colloquially used synonymously with a pressure washer and the verb "kärchern" has been increasingly used in the German-speaking world since the turn of the millennium to refer to working with high-pressure cleaners. Since 2018, "kärchern" has been listed as a term in the German dictionary Duden, and it is also included in the Austrian Dictionary.

In France, the word "karcher" was added to the dictionary Petit Robert in 2006, after the then French Interior Minister Nicolas Sarkozy controversially stated in 2005 that he wanted to "kärcher" the Paris suburbs (banlieues); obviously meaning all criminals and other undesirables should be removed. This comment was highly controversial, as many French associate the banlieues with immigrants, especially North Africans. As a response, Kärcher France sent a letter to all of the candidates in the 2007 presidential election asking them not to use the company's name this way, and it has run ads in newspapers disassociating itself from the remarks.

== Engagement ==
=== Cultural sponsorship ===
Since 1980, the company has undertaken over 190 cultural sponsorship projects worldwide, focusing particularly on the cleaning of renowned historical buildings, monuments, and sites. This work is carried out in collaboration with restorers and conservationists. Kärcher offers these services free of charge; according to the Neue Zürcher Zeitung, however, Kärcher can simultaneously use these high-profile projects for advertising and showcasing its equipment. As of 2019, Kärcher undertook approximately ten to fifteen cultural cleaning projects per year, involving up to 15 employees in each project.

Under its cultural sponsorship program, Kärcher has supported more than 190 projects to clean internationally prominent buildings such as the National Monument in Jakarta (2014), the Space Needle in Seattle (2008), the London Eye in London (2013), the Presidents' heads at the Mount Rushmore National Memorial (2005), the Colossi of Memnon in Luxor (2003), the Colonnades on St. Peter's Square in Rome (1998), the Statue of Liberty in New York City (1985) and the Statue of Christ in Rio de Janeiro (1980). In 2011 it cleaned the Loreley open-air stage and the N Seoul Tower. The Brandenburg Gate in Berlin, which had greyed during the German division, was cleaned by Kärcher for the first time in 1990, following the fall of the Berlin Wall. In 2016, the Hermann Monument in Detmold and the fountains at Stuttgart's Schlossplatz were added to their projects. In 2018, the walls of the choir at Ulm Minster, the church with the world's tallest steeple, were cleaned with battery-operated backpack vacuums.

In 2020, Kärcher simultaneously cleaned the South Tower of Berlin Cathedral and the world's largest Bismarck Monument in Hamburg. Kärcher also carried out cleaning work on the Horseshoe Staircase at Palace of Fontainebleau in Paris in 2020. Projects from the 2020s include the cleaning of Cologne Cathedral, the over 3,300-years-old Luxor obelisk on the Place de la Concorde in Paris, the steps in front of the Württemberg Mausoleum in Stuttgart, and the Citadel of Besançon.

=== Sports sponsorship ===
From 1994 to 1997, Kärcher was the shirt sponsor of FC Schalke 04. Since 2005, the company has maintained a sponsorship partnership with VfB Stuttgart, particularly with the youth teams. Kärcher also partnered with SC Freiburg from 2013 to 2018. Additionally, Kärcher has been a sponsor of the team SG Sonnenhof Großaspach. Internationally, Kärcher has been a sponsor of the AFC Champions League and the AFC Cup.

In 2012, Kärcher became the main sponsor of the handball team TVB Stuttgart and extended the contract until 2031 in 2020. In 2017, Kärcher also became a sponsor of the volleyball team Allianz MTV Stuttgart. Kärcher collaborated with the Riesen Ludwigsburg from the 2017/2018 season until 2019.

The cleaning appliance manufacturer has been a regular partner of the Stuttgart-Lauf since the 2010s, including naming the half marathon in 2017 and 2018.

Kärcher is a partner of the Dakar Rally, providing equipment for cleaning the cars. Since 2012, the company has been a sponsor of the ADAC GT Masters. In Formula 3, the cleaning equipment manufacturer supported driver David Beckmann from 2016 onwards. Kärcher also entered into a partnership with the FIA World Rallycross Championship in 2017, which lasted until 2019.

=== Sustainability ===
In 2012, Kärcher, in collaboration with the Global Nature Fund, established the initiative "Clean Water for the World". This partnership facilitates the construction of plant-based wastewater treatment facilities in developing and emerging countries. These facilities prevent untreated wastewater from contaminating groundwater. Since 2013, such a facility has been successfully operational in the town of San Miguel de Sema, with a population of 4,000, in the Boyacá region of Colombia. The initiative has been further supported by the sales of Kärcher's eco!ogic range of high-pressure cleaners. As of 2021, Kärcher has built 17 green filter and 14 drinking water plants. Since 2019, Kärcher has been collaborating with the non-profit organisation One Earth One Ocean, which works globally to combat beach pollution. For instance, Kärcher funds a cleaning team on the Mekong River in Cambodia. Additionally, Kärcher has created a two-and-a-half-hectare biotope on its company grounds.

In the event of natural disasters, Kärcher is involved both nationally and internationally. The company supports clean-up efforts, donates equipment, and provides water purification systems for clean drinking water in crisis areas. For example, during the 2021 European floods, Kärcher donated high-pressure cleaners, dirty water pumps, generators, and wet and dry vacuums to disaster relief agencies and the German Red Cross.

With regard to sustainability, Kärcher has set the goal of increasing the proportion of recycled plastics in selected Kärcher products to up to 50 percent by 2025 and making packaging more environmentally friendly. In 2020, Kärcher joined the Alliance for Development and Climate to support certified CO_{2} compensation projects in developing countries, use recycled materials, and reduce packaging waste. Compared to 2020, Kärcher reduced the carbon dioxide emissions of its production and logistics sites by 16,660 tonnes by 2023, which corresponds to 28 percent.

=== Community and social commitment ===
Kärcher is a partner of the SOS Children's Villages organisation. Since 2011, the company has been supporting the SOS Children's Villages organisation both with equipment and financially.

== Awards (selection) ==
Kärcher was awarded the German Marketing Prize in 1997 and 2018, becoming the first company to receive the prize twice. Throughout the history of the IF Product Design Awards, Kärcher has been recognised over 90 times, including in two categories in 2023.

In the 2020s, Kärcher has also received the following awards, among others:

- 2020, 2021, 2022, 2023: Axia Best Managed Companies Award.
- 2021, 2025: The National German Sustainability Award.
- 2021: Red Dot Design Award in three categories.
- 2022: Environmental Award of the State of Baden-Württemberg in the category Commitment to Climate Protection.
- 2022: The National German Sustainability Award in the category Transformation field resources.
- 2023: Red Dot Design Award in two categories.
