= Columbia Lake Provincial Park =

Provincial park in British Columbia, Canada

- IUCN category II (national park)
- Location within British Columbia
- Interactive map of Columbia Lake Provincial Park
- Location: Kootenay Land District, British Columbia, Canada
- Nearest city: Invermere, BC
- Coordinates: 50°18′44″N 115°50′52″W
- Area: 290 ha (720 acres)
- Established: January 7, 1988
- Governing body: BC Parks

Columbia Lake Provincial Park is a provincial park in British Columbia, Canada, located on the northeast shore of Columbia Lake south of the town of Invermere. The park was established in 1988, comprising approximately 260 hectares (640 acres). Its boundary was expanded in 2004, the total now comprising approximately 290 hectares (720 acres), 275 hectares (680 acres) of which is upland, 15 hectares (37 acres) of which is foreshore.

== See also ==
- Columbia Lake Ecological Reserve
