= Karen Vachon =

American politician

Karen Vachon is an American politician in the Republican Party. Vachon received a bachelor's degree in business administration from New England College. She served two terms representing the 29th district in the Maine House of Representatives from 2014 to 2018, losing her reelection bid in 2020. During her time in office, Vachon helped to pass a bill that improved water quality testing across the state.

== Electoral History ==
General election for Maine House of Representatives District 29, 2018
Party	Candidate	Votes	%
Democratic	Shawn Babine	3,001	53.6%
Republican	Karen Vachon	2,602	46.4%

General election for Maine House of Representatives District 29, 2016
Party	Candidate	Votes	%
Republican	Karen Vachon	3,193	52.86%
Democratic	Theodora Kalikow	2,847	47.14%

General election for Maine House of Representatives District 29, 2014
Party	Candidate	Votes	%
Republican	Karen Vachon	2,541	48.3%
Democratic	Paul Aranson	2,467	46.9%
NOTA	Blank Votes	248	4.7%
