= Fairmount Avenue =

Fairmount Avenue may refer to:

- Fairmount Avenue (Baltimore County), a road in Baltimore County, Maryland
- Fairmount Avenue Line, MTA Maryland bus route #23
- Fairmount Avenue (NJT station), former New Jersey Transit Rail station
- Fairmount Avenue (MBTA station), MBTA rail station in Massachusetts
- Fairmount Avenue Historic District, in Philadelphia, Pennsylvania
- 26 Fairmount Avenue, children's novel by Tomie de Paola
- Fairmount Avenue (Montreal), site of several famous Montreal landmarks, such as Fairmount Bagel
- Fairmount Avenue, the defining street of Fairmount, Richmond, Virginia
- Fairmount Avenue, the defining street of Fairmount, Philadelphia, Pennsylvania

== See also ==
- Fairmount Historic District (disambiguation)
- Fairmount (disambiguation)
