= Fairmont =

Fairmont can refer to:

== Places ==
=== Canada ===
- Fairmont Hot Springs, British Columbia, a resort town
  - Fairmont Mountain, a summit near Fairmont Hot Springs

=== United States ===
- Fairmont, Illinois
- Fairmont, Minnesota
- Fairmont, Missouri
- Fairmont, Nebraska
  - Fairmont State Airfield, Fairmont, Nebraska, listed on the NRHP in Nebraska
- Fairmont, North Carolina
- Fairmont, Oklahoma
- Fairmont (Columbia, Tennessee), listed on the National Register of Historic Places in Tennessee
- Fairmont (UTA station), a Utah Transit Authority station in Salt Lake City, Utah
- Fairmont, Baltimore, a neighborhood in Baltimore
- Fairmont, West Virginia
  - Fairmont Downtown Historic District, Fairmont, WV, listed on the NRHP in West Virginia

== Business ==
- Fairmont Hotels and Resorts, a Toronto, Ontario-based operator
- Fairmont Railway Motors, an American former rail vehicle company, now part of Harsco Rail
- Ford Fairmont, an American automobile (1978–1983)
- Ford Fairmont (Australia), an Australian automobile

== Education ==
- Fairmont Preparatory Academy, a school in Anaheim, California
- Fairmont State University, a public university in Fairmont, West Virginia
- Fairmount College, a former college in Wichita that became Wichita State University

== Music ==
- Fairmont (band), American indie-rock band active 2001-

== See also ==
- Fairmount (disambiguation)
