= Fairmount Park (disambiguation) =

Fairmount Park may refer to:

- Fairmount Park, a municipal park in Philadelphia, Pennsylvania
- Fairmount Park (Riverside, California), a municipal park
- Fairmount Park, San Diego, California, a neighborhood
- Fairmount Park, Seattle, Washington, a western neighborhood
- Fairmount Park Racetrack, a horse racing track in Collinsville, Illinois
- Fairmount Park, Virginia, a neighborhood in Norfolk, Virginia
- Fairmount Park, Missouri, a late 19th Century amusement park near Kansas City, Missouri.

== See also ==
- Fairmount (disambiguation)
- Fairmont (disambiguation)
