= Fairmont Hot Springs =

Fairmont Hot Springs may refer to:

- Fairmont Hot Springs, British Columbia
  - Fairmont Hot Springs Airport, adjacent to the British Columbia community
- Fairmont Hot Springs, Montana, United States
  - Fairmont Hot Springs Resort, resort in Fairmont Hot Springs
  - Fairmont Hot Springs (thermal spring) formerly known as Gregson Hot Springs
