= Hoodoo =

Hoodoo most commonly refers to:

- Hoodoo (spirituality), a traditional African American folk spirituality
- Hoodoo (geology), a rock formation

Hoodoo may also refer to:

== Places ==
=== Canada ===
- Hoodoo Mountain, a stratovolcano in northwestern British Columbia
- Castle Rock Hoodoos Provincial Park, near Savona, British Columbia
- Dutch Creek Hoodoos, near Canal Flats, British Columbia
- Rural Municipality of Hoodoo No. 401, Saskatchewan, a rural municipality

=== United States ===
- Hoodoo Mountains in Idaho
- Hoodoo Butte, a volcanic cone in Oregon
- Hoodoo (ski area), a ski resort in Oregon
- Hoodoo Peak, a mountain in Washington state
- Hoodoo Peak (Wyoming), a mountain in Yellowstone National Park

== Music ==
- Hoodoo (Alison Moyet album), the third solo album by singer-songwriter Alison Moyet, or its title track
- Hoodoo (John Fogerty album), John Fogerty's third solo album, recorded in the late spring of 1976 but never released
- Hoodoo (Krokus album), the 16th album by heavy metal band Krokus
- "Hoodoo", a song by the English rock band Muse from their album Black Holes and Revelations

== Other uses ==
- Hoodoo, a book by Ronald L. Smith
- Hoodoo: Unraveling the 100 Year Mystery of the Chicago Cubs, a book by Grant DePorter
- Horatio J. HooDoo, a character in the Lidsville TV series
- Hoodoo McFiggin, a character in the short story "Hoodoo McFiggin's Christmas" by Stephen Leacock

== See also ==
- The Hoodoo War (1875–1876)
- USS Texas (1892), a battleship of the United States Navy nicknamed "Old Hoodoo"
- Voodoo (disambiguation)
