= Fairmount Historic District =

Fairmount Historic District may refer to:

in the United States (by state then city)

- Fairmount Commercial Historic District, Fairmount, Indiana, listed on the National Register of Historic Places (NRHP) in Grant County, Indiana
- Upper Fairmount Historic District, Upper Fairmount, Maryland, listed on the NRHP in Somerset County, Maryland
- Fairmount Historic District (Califon, New Jersey), listed on the NRHP in Hunterdon County and Morris County, New Jersey
- Fairmount Boulevard District, Cleveland Heights, Ohio, listed on the NRHP in Ohio
- Fairmount Avenue Historic District, Philadelphia, Pennsylvania, listed on the NRHP in North Philadelphia
- Fairmount Historic District (York City, Pennsylvania), listed on the NRHP in York County, Pennsylvania
- Fairmount-Southside Historic District, Fort Worth, Texas, listed on the NRHP in Tarrant County, Texas
- Fairmount Historic District (Richmond, Virginia), listed on the NRHP in Richmond, Virginia

== See also ==
- Fairmont Historic District (disambiguation)
