= Fairmount =

Fairmount may refer to:

== Places ==
=== Canada ===
- Fairmount, Frontenac County, Ontario
- Fairmount, Grey County, Ontario
- Fairmount, Nova Scotia

=== United States of America ===
- Fairmount, Delaware
- Fairmount, Georgia
- Fairmount, Illinois
- Fairmount, Indiana
- Fairmount, Iowa
- Fairmount, Kansas
- Fairmount, Maryland
- Fairmount, New Jersey
  - Fairmount Historic District (Califon, New Jersey), listed on the NRHP in Hunterdon County and Morris County, New Jersey
  - Lower Fairmount, New Jersey
- Fairmount Township, New Jersey
- Fairmount, New York
- Fairmount, North Dakota
- Fairmount Township, Luzerne County, Pennsylvania
- Fairmount, Tennessee
- Neighborhoods
  - Fairmount, Louisville, Kentucky
  - Fairmount (Duluth), Minnesota
  - Fairmount, Newark, New Jersey
  - North Fairmount, Cincinnati
  - South Fairmount, Cincinnati, Ohio
  - Fairmount, Philadelphia, Pennsylvania
  - Fairmount, Richmond, Virginia
- Fairmount Park, Philadelphia, Pennsylvania

== Transportation ==
- Fairmount Line, in Massachusetts, United States
- Fairmount station (MBTA), in Boston, Massachusetts, United States
- Fairmount station (SEPTA), in Philadelphia, Pennsylvania, United States

== Other uses ==
- Fairmount Food Group
- DuBose Conference Center, originally established as Fairmont College, Monteagle, Tennessee

== See also ==
- Fairmount Hotel (disambiguation)
- Fairmount Park (disambiguation)
- Fairmont (disambiguation)
