= Fairmont Mountain =

Mountain in British Columbia, Canada

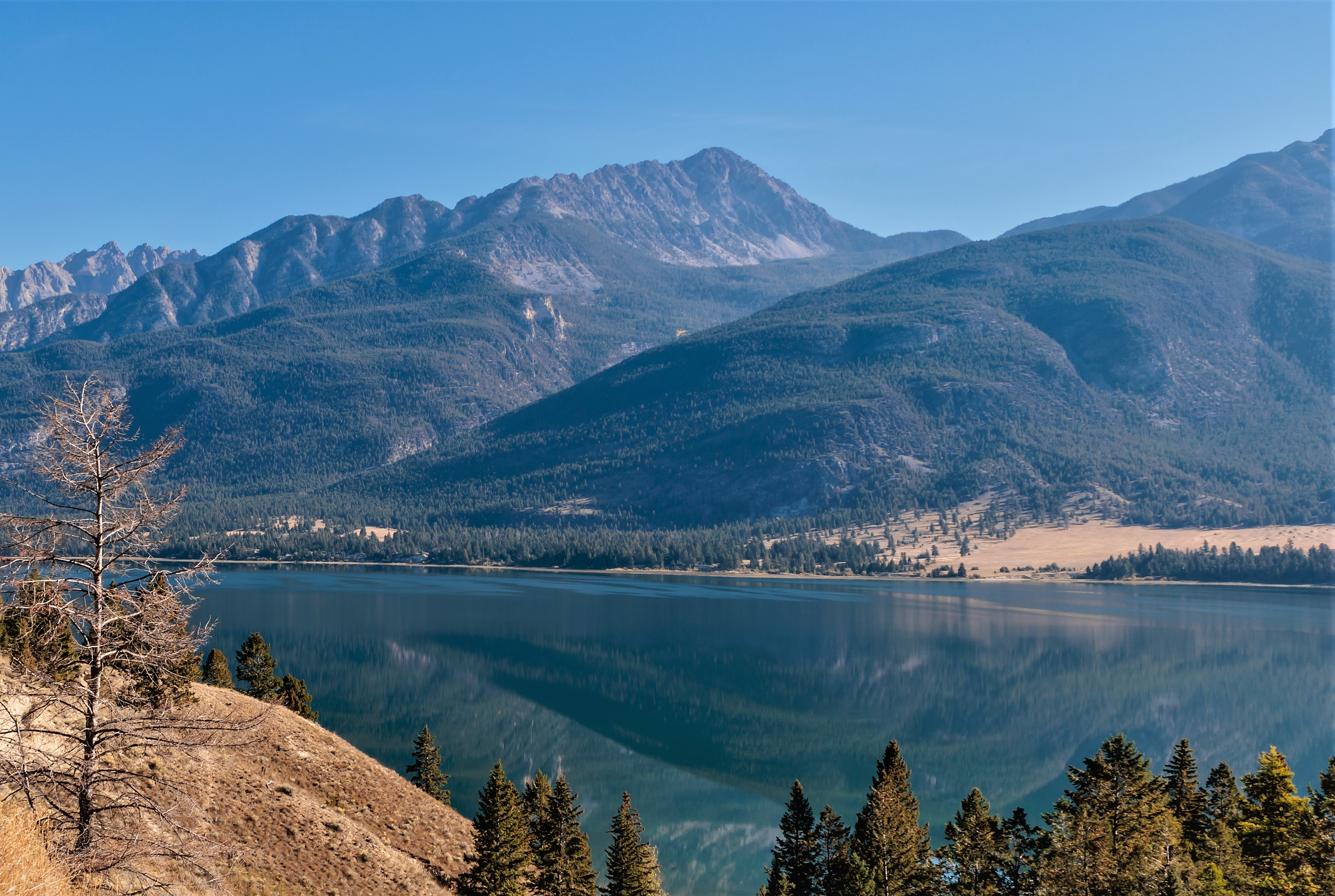
- Southwest aspect, with Columbia Lake

Highest point
- Elevation: 2,628 m (8,622 ft)
- Prominence: 396 m (1,299 ft)
- Parent peak: Chisel Peak Mountain (2,697 m)
- Isolation: 10.1 km (6.3 mi)
- Listing: Mountains of British Columbia
- Coordinates: 50°18′18″N 115°46′54″W

Geography
- Location within British Columbia Location within Canada
- Interactive map of Fairmont Mountain
- Location: British Columbia, Canada
- District: Kootenay Land District
- Parent range: Stanford Range; Canadian Rockies
- Topo map: NTS 82J5 Fairmont Hot Springs

Fairmont Mountain is a 2,628-metre (8,622-foot) summit located in British Columbia, Canada.

== Description ==
Situated in the Stanford Range of the Kootenay Ranges of the Canadian Rockies, this prominent peak is visible from Highway 93. The peak is situated five kilometers southeast of Fairmont Hot Springs and five kilometers northeast of Columbia Lake. Topographic relief is significant as the summit rises 1,820 meters (5,970 ft) above the Rocky Mountain Trench in five kilometers. Precipitation runoff from the mountain drains east into tributaries of the Kootenay River and west into tributaries of the Columbia River.

== History ==
The mountain was named in association with Fairmont Hot Springs Post Office. The toponym was officially adopted 3 February 1954 when approved by the Geographical Names Board of Canada.

== Climate ==
Based on the Köppen climate classification, Fairmont Mountain has a subarctic climate with cold, snowy winters, and mild summers. Winter temperatures can drop below −20 °C with wind chill factors below −30 °C.

== Gallery ==
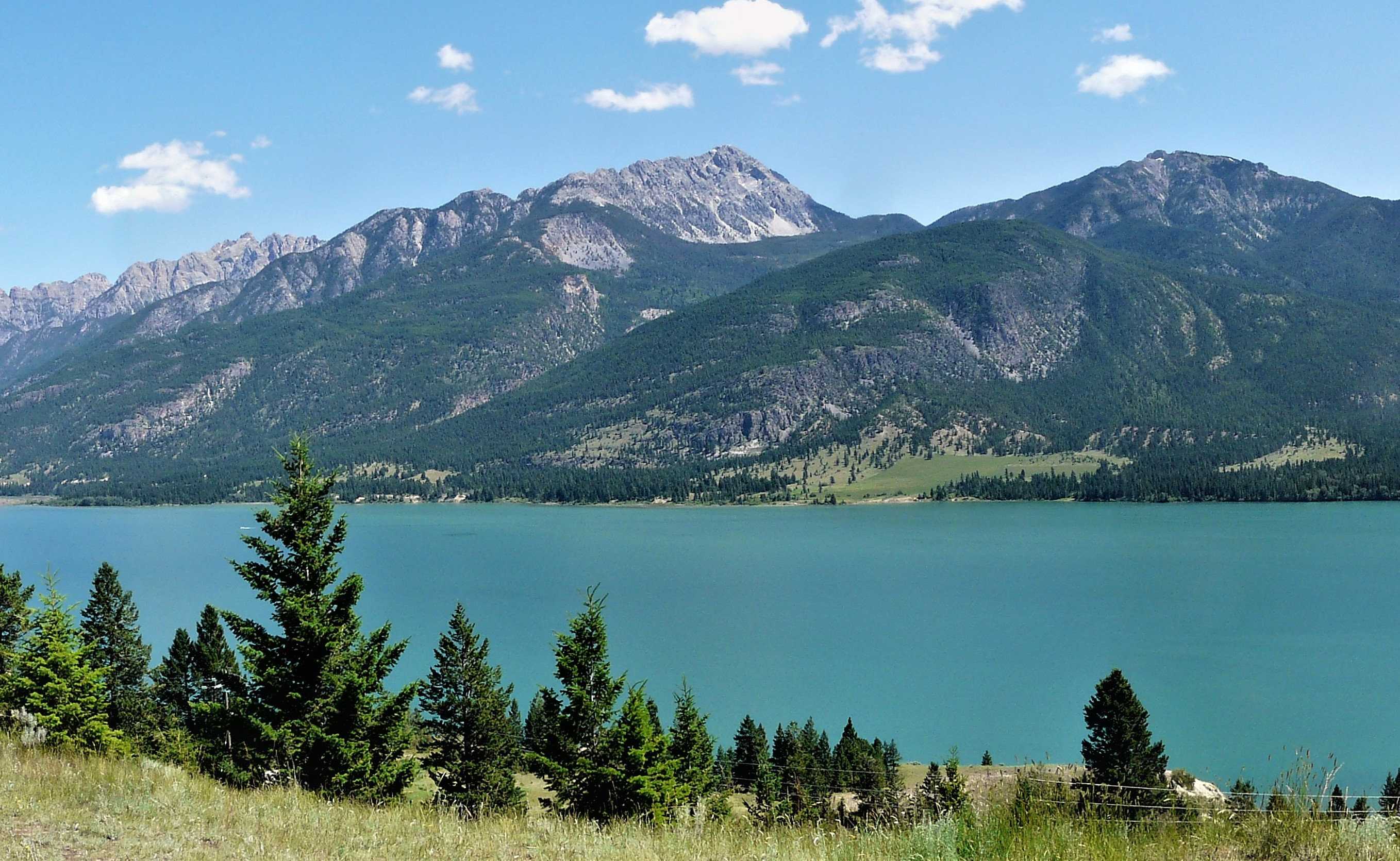
Fairmont Mountain from Columbia Lake

== See also ==
- Geography of British Columbia
