= Fairmont Historic District =

Fairmont Historic District may refer to:

- Fairmont Avenue Historic District, Zanesville, Ohio, listed on the National Register of Historic Places in Muskingum County, Ohio
- Fairmont Downtown Historic District, Fairmont, West Virginia, listed on the National Register of Historic Places in Marion County, West Virginia

== See also ==
- Fairmount Historic District (disambiguation)
