= Fairmount, New Jersey =

Populated place in Hunterdon County, New Jersey, US

- Unincorporated community
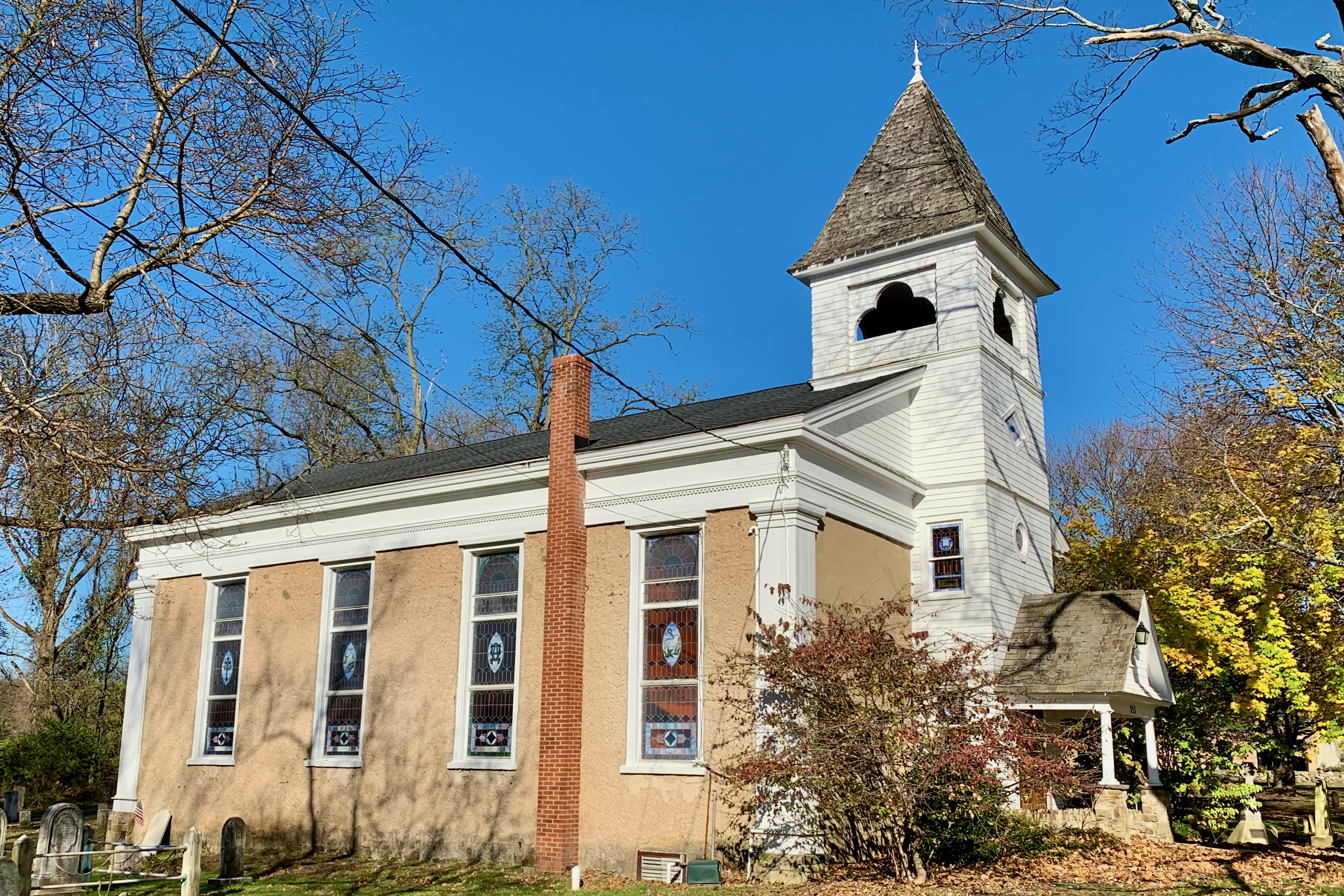
- Fairmount Presbyterian Church, listed on the National Register of Historic Places

- Location in Hunterdon County Location in New Jersey Location in the United States
- Coordinates: 40°43′37″N 74°46′35″W
- Country: United States
- State: New Jersey
- County: Hunterdon
- Township: Tewksbury
- Elevation: 768 ft (234 m)
- GNIS feature ID: 876264

Fairmount is an unincorporated community located along County Route 517 in Tewksbury Township of Hunterdon County, New Jersey. The community was first known as Parkersville, named after proprietor James Parker (1725–1797). The southern section of the community is known as Lower Fairmount.

== History ==
The first European settlers arrived here c. 1740 and named the area Fox Hill, after a local farmer. The Fairmount Presbyterian Church was founded in 1747 as a German Reformed congregation in a log cabin. The current church was built from 1851 to 1852 with Greek Revival and Shingle styles. The Methodist Episcopal Church of Fairmount was built in 1837. The current Fairmount United Methodist Church was built in 1868 with Romanesque Revival and Italianate styles. A mill was built in the early 1800s on the Rockaway Creek. By the 1880s, Fairmount had two churches, two stores, a sawmill, gristmill, schoolhouse, and the largest tannery in the county.

== Historic district ==
The Fairmount Historic District encompassing the community was added to the National Register of Historic Places in 1996 for its significance in architecture, exploration/settlement, and industry.
