= Gregson Hot Springs =

Thermal springs in Montana, United States

- Fairmont Hot Springs
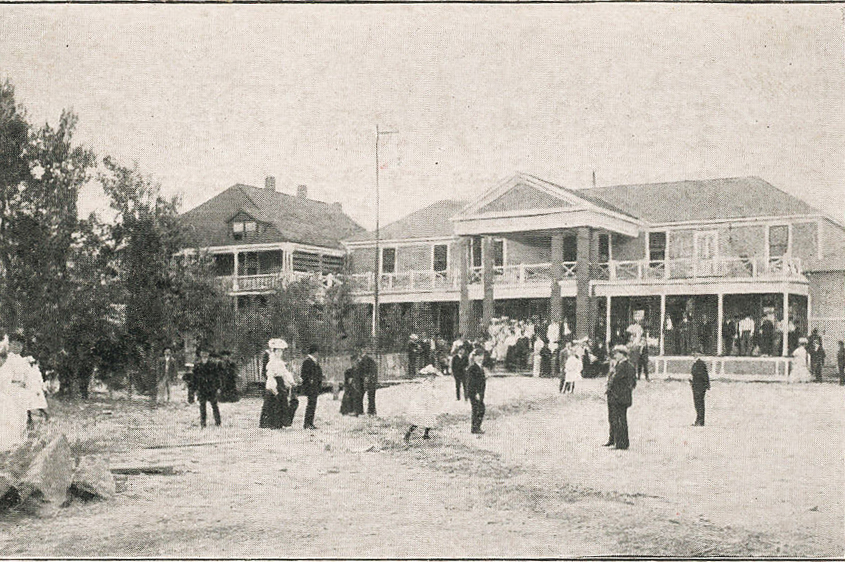
- Gregson Hot Springs in 1905
- Interactive map of Gregson Hot Springs
- Location: 15 miles west of Butte, Montana
- Coordinates: 46°2′38.4″N 112°48′39.6″W
- Type: geothermal
- Discharge: 151 liters per minute
- Temperature: 158 °F (70 °C)

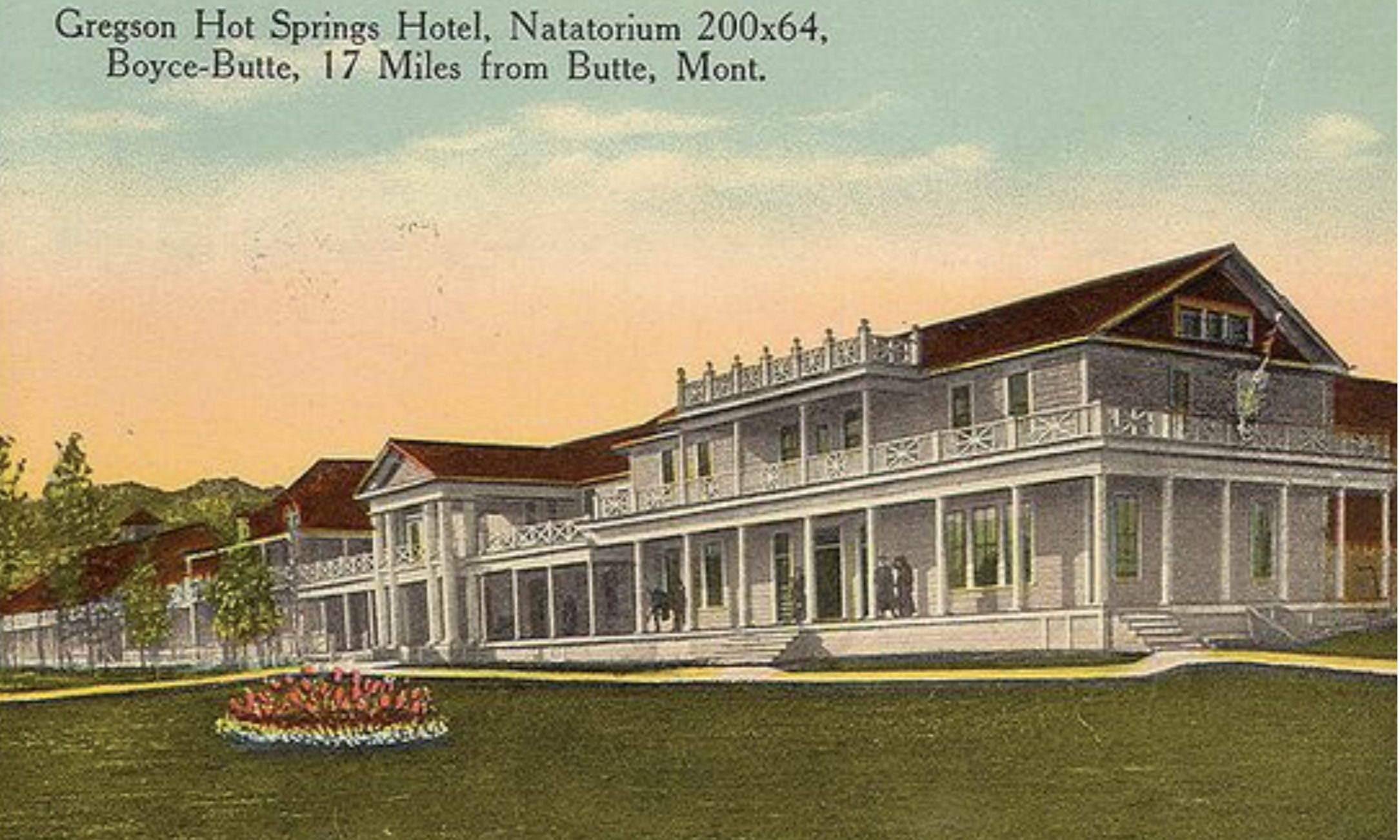
Postcard of Gregson Hot Springs Hotel c.1910

Gregson Hot Springs also known as Fairmont Hot Springs, is a geothermal hot spring system located in Silver Bow County, Montana. Over the years the mineral-rich hot spring water was thought to relieve rheumatism and arthritis among other ailments.

== History ==
The Flathead, Nez Perce and Shoshone indigenous peoples first used the hot springs before settlers arrived in the area. It is said that they were referred to as "medicine waters". At that time the area consisted of 12 primitive spring-fed soaking pools.

In 1869, the hot springs property was acquired for $60 from a settler who was squatting at the site, by John and Eli Gregson. The Gregsons began developing the site by building a two-story hotel, with five bathing rooms and a plunge bath. The bathhouses were plumbed for hot and cold water via a covered flume. The hot spring water and the minerals contained within were thought to relieve rheumatism and arthritis among other ailments. Later the Gregsons built a bar room.

In 1890, Miles French leased and later purchased the property from the Gregsons.

In the early 20th century, four trains per day stopped near the hot springs, transporting guests to the hotel and bathhouses.

In 1914, a fire occurred that halted the business for a time, and in 1927 a new hotel was built.

In 1916, the property was sold to George Forsythe who rebuilt the hotel and expanded the site to attract tourism. He ran the facility until 1935, after which his wife, Victoria, became the proprietor until it was sold to Treasure State Industries in 1959.

In the early 1970s, the facilities were closed due to disrepair. In 1972 the property was purchased by Lloyd Wilder, a Canadian hot spring developer who changed the name to Fairmont Hot Springs after the hot springs he owned in British Columbia. The Montana Standard newspaper reported that U.S. Federal funds were used to help develop a resort complex that includes a golf course, tennis courts, outdoor pool and additional guest rooms. The original, historical hotel and all the historical buildings were demolished.

In 1981, Leroy Mayes purchased the hot springs, however in 1990 Wilder repurchased the property after two financial companies had taken it over. As recent as 2016, Wilder's children own (in trust) the hot springs hotel and land on the original thermal spring site. None of the original historic structures exist and only paying guests at the hotel are permitted to use the hotsprings.

== Water profile ==
The hot spring water flows from the spring sources at approximately 151 liters per minute at a temperature of 158 °F / 70 °C. Reports from the Montana Bureau of Mines and Geology records the major ions in the chemical make-up of the water as: Calcium 4.270 mg/L, Sodium 180 mg/L, Potassium 3.9 mg/L, silica 71.7 mg/L, Bicarbonate 124.9 mg/L, Carbonate 12.2 mg/L, Chloride 17.52 mg/L, Sulfate 181.7 mg/L, Fluoride 16.92 mg/L. The field pH of the water is 8.61.
