= Dutch Creek Hoodoos =

Coordinates: 50.3125°N 115.8957°W

The Dutch Creek Hoodoos are located in British Columbia, Canada, and can be seen along British Columbia Highway 93/British Columbia Highway 95 between Canal Flats and Fairmont Hot Springs, British Columbia. The Dutch Creek Hoodoos are within a 67-acre conservation area that is managed by the Natural Conservancy of British Columbia. This conservation area is joined by the Nature Trust Hoffert Property and they both act as a habitat for varying plants and animals including the American badger, Lewis's woodpecker, the Hooker's Townsendia, Eagle, and Hawk. The Dutch Creek Hoodoos can be further discovered by following the 4.6 mile trail that faces an elevation gain of 95 meters over the course of the trail.

== Formation ==
The Dutch Creek Hoodoos are formed just like all other Hoodoos form. Over time as the ground shifts and moves cracks form that causes pockets to form. When rain begins to fall it is easily caught in the cracks and can often settle within those pockets. As temperatures drop the water freezes and expands the pockets often causing larger portions of rock to break off. This process is referred to as Ice Wedging and the repeating of this process causes the formation of a Fin. When ice wedging occurs within the fin a Window can form and when a window can no longer support the weight it breaks and leaves behind what we now call a Hoodoo.

== History ==
The Ktunaxa Nation is made up of the Kootenai tribe that is made up of people from Idaho, Montana, and British Columbia Canada. Throughout history, the Ktunaxa nation has told their Creation story that depicts how the Ktunaxa nations boundaries and lakes was formed. At the roots of the Ktunaxa nation you'd find an ancestral world full of animals because humans had not yet been created. During those ancestral times the ancient sea monster Yawunik was known to kill a number of animals so a council head up by the Chief animal Nalmuqcin was formed to defeat Yawunik. The council combined the Kootenay River and Columbia River systems to trap Yawunik within the Columbia Lake and chased him throughout the river system. Over the course of this chase Yawunik gave name to many well known locations near the rivers and lakes of Canada. As the chase continued so did the naming of locations along the way. After failing to capture Yawunik multiple times Nalmuqcin sat along the river and had a conversation with Kikum. Kikum was a wise old one who suggested that Nalmuqcin use his size and strength to block the flow of the river into the lake and successfully trap Yawunik within. When they implemented the plan, the council was able to trap Yawunik and send in Yamakpal to deliver the final blow and drag his remains ashore. The bones of Yawunik were scattered around and the ribs were what we now refer to as the Dutch Creek Hoodoos. The different colored remains were scattered around the new nation and the different colors represented the different races of people that would congregate within that area including white, black, yellow, and red. The story comes to an end as Malnuqcin stands up overjoyed at the councils recent accomplishments and hits his head on the ceiling of the sky successfully knocking himself dead. The varying portions of his very large body are said to be strewn throughout many well known locations such as Yellowhead Pass, Yellowstone Park, and the Rocky Mountains. The Ktunaxa Nation believes the people were then deemed the keepers of the land and the many animals were able to ascend to the above and act as spirit guides to the people who remained below.
