= Fairmount Park, Missouri =

Former amusement park

Coordinates: 39.1067°N 94.4506°W

Fairmount Park was an early amusement park, located in what is now Sugar Creek, Missouri, north of Independence, Missouri. Known initially as Cusenbary Park, the resort was christened Fairmount Park on September 12, 1892 at an event attended by railroad magnate Arthur Stillwell, and other stockholders of his Kansas City & Independence Air Line. At this time a half-mile long lake had recently been completed, and a swimming beach was under construction. The railroad had signed a 20-year lease from the landowner at a rate of $100 per month.

An advertisement in the Kansas City Star of July 3, 1894, promised Independence Day attractions including "Speedy's Great Dive", a 100-foot dive into a 36-inch deep tank, along with a human cannonball stunt in which a man was to be fired from a cannon mounted on a hot air balloon at an altitude of 5,000 feet. Other attractions included a bathing beach, a trapeze act, and performances by the Third Regiment Band. The annual July 4th show attracted crowds as large as 53,000 people.

By June 1911, the railroad management had defaulted on their lease payments, and a federal court awarded possession of the park along with its buildings, which included a passenger depot, hotel, auditorium and several cottages to the landowner James D Cusenbary.

At its peak the park included a zoo, a 9-hole golf course, and a bowling alley. A series of fires in the 1920s and 1930s destroyed the park's buildings, with a final fire in 1936 consuming the last holiday cottages.

The lake was found to be polluted in the late 1930s, and by the early 1940s had been drained, with development for houses underway. A community ball park now stands on the site of a large bathhouse on the former lakefront.

Closing time was described by a 1914-born local:

After they would close the place, people would climb on the roof of [the streetcar], hang on the windows of it, hang on the outside of it and they would still take off.

— John Kerr

== Media ==
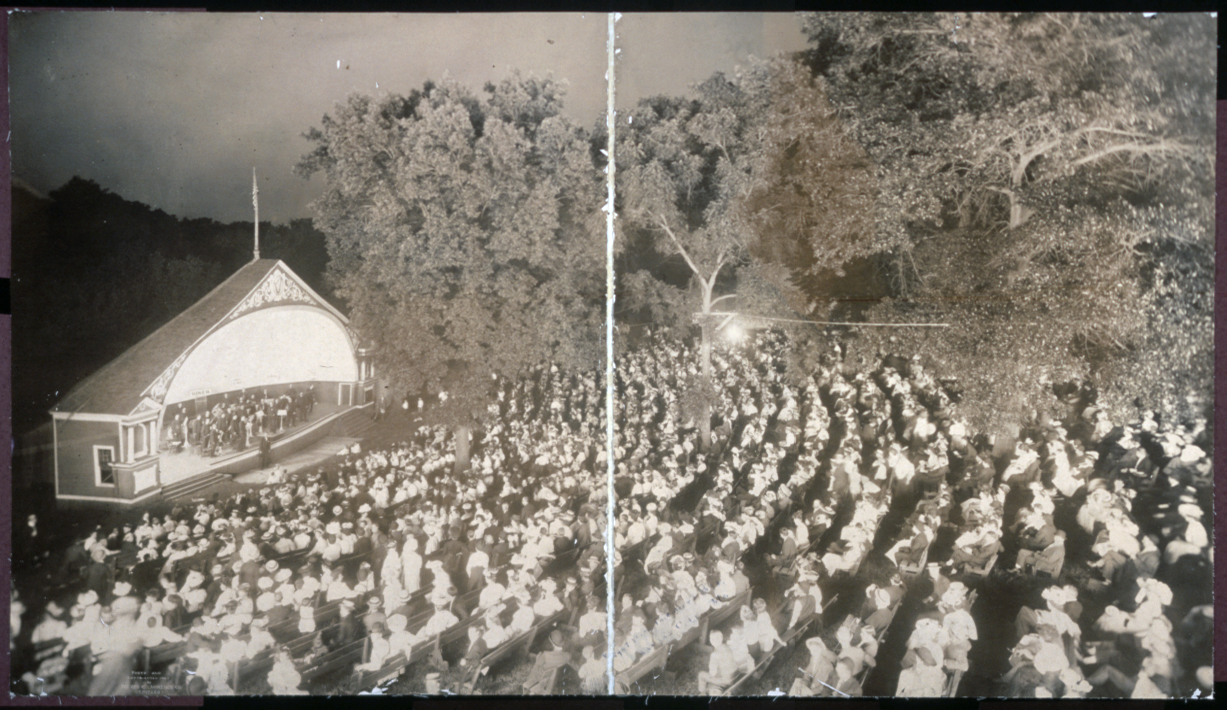
A night-time scene showing a packed crowd at a stage in Fairmount Park.

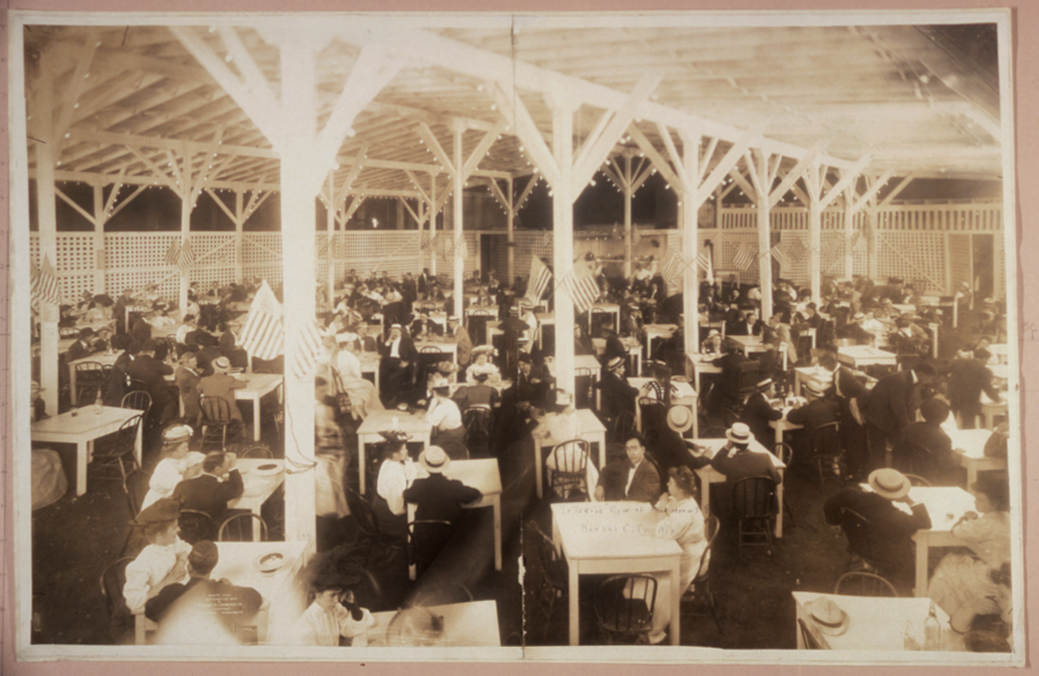
Interior view of Fairmount Park, Kansas City, MO

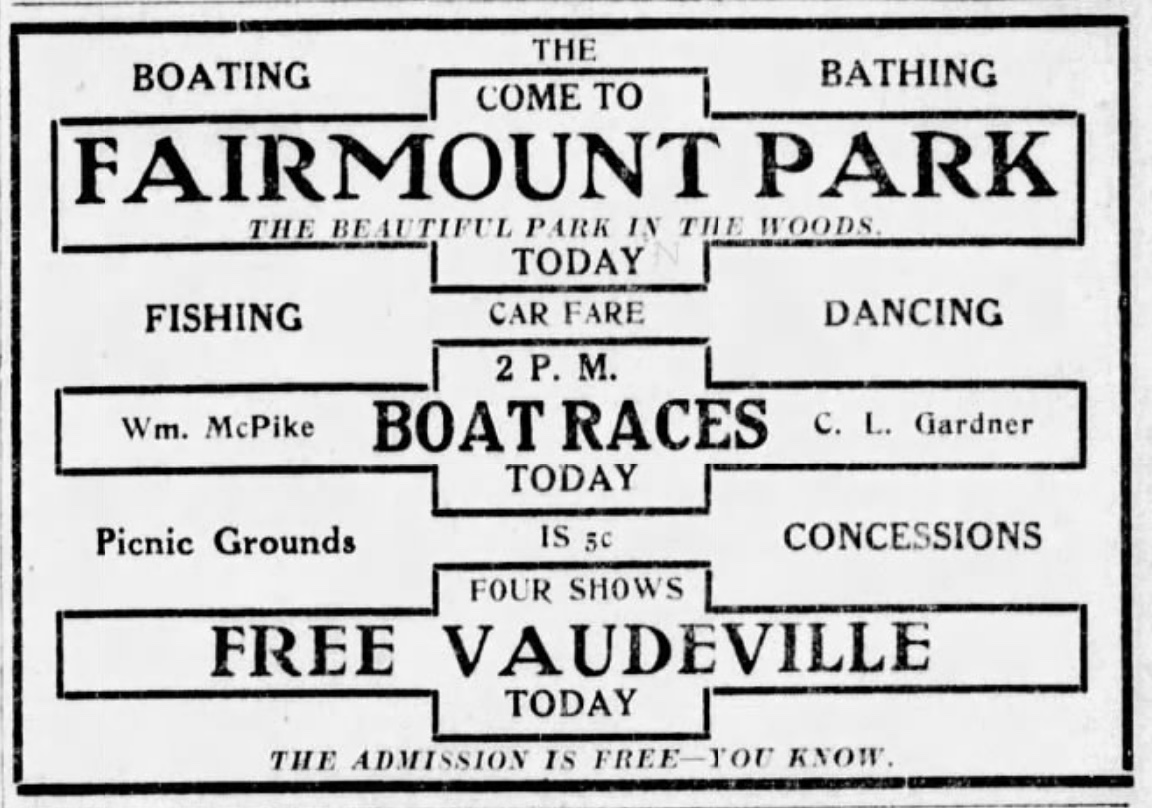
June 6, 1909, ad in the Kansas City Star
