= Ford Fairmont (Australia) =

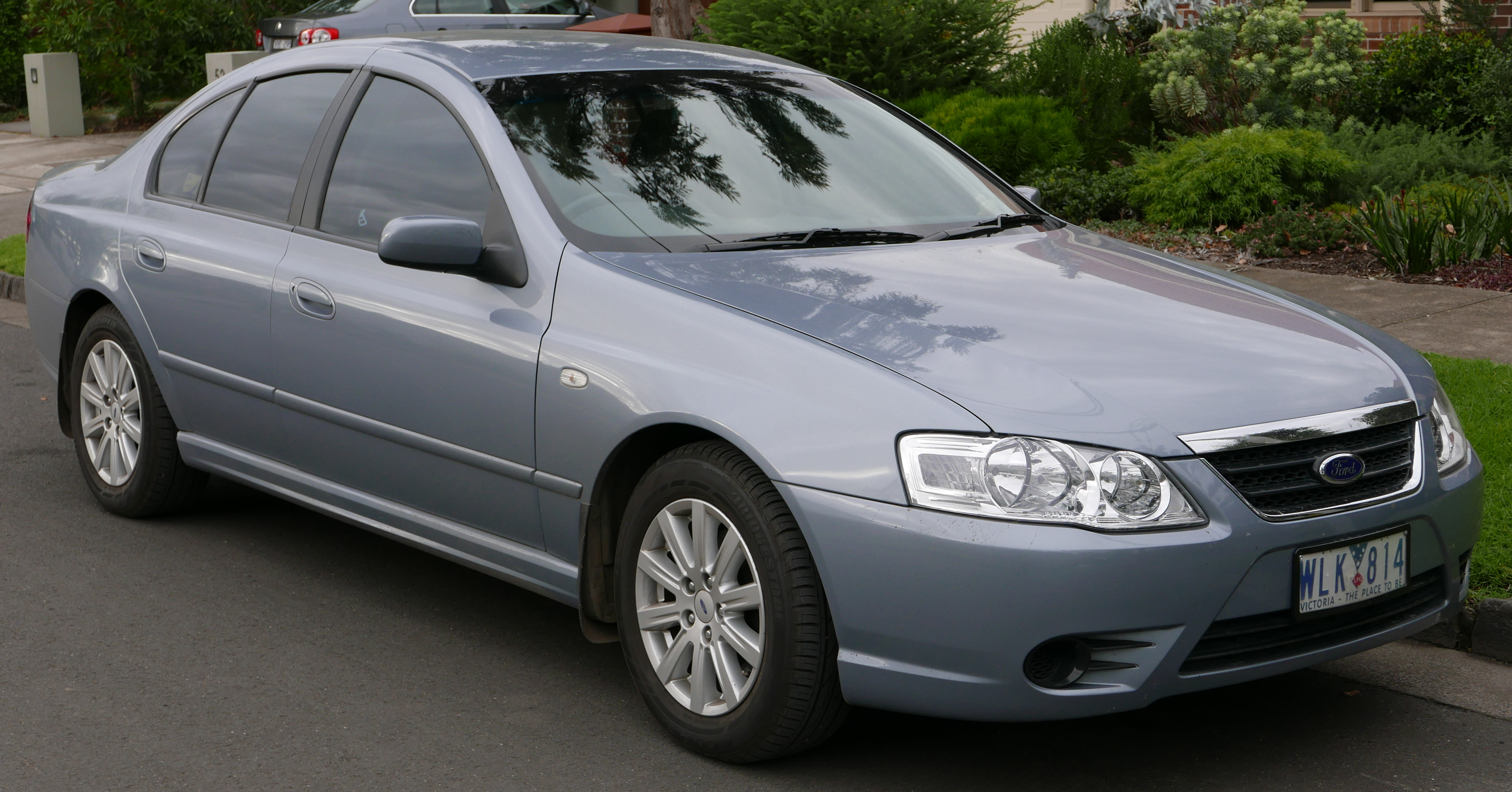
- 2006–2008 Ford Fairmont (BF II) sedan

Overview
- Manufacturer: Ford Australia
- Production: 1965–2008
- Assembly: Broadmeadows

Body and chassis
- Class: Full-size
- Body style: 4-door sedan 5-door station wagon 2-door hardtop

Chronology
- Successor: Ford G6/G6E

The Ford Fairmont is a full-size car that was built by Ford Australia as an upmarket model of the Ford Falcon from 1965 to 2008. It featured a higher level of standard equipment than corresponding Falcon models of the same series. As well as offering a more luxurious interior trim with additional comfort and convenience features, for much of its first 25 years the Fairmont also offered a higher mechanical specification; a larger capacity engine and refinements such as disc brakes, power steering and automatic transmission that were extra cost options for the Falcon were fitted as standard equipment for the Fairmont. It was available as a four-door sedan throughout its life, as a five-door station wagon from its introduction through to 2002, and as a two-door hardtop from 1972 to 1978.

== History ==
The Fairmont was added to Ford's Australian lineup in September 1965 as part of the Falcon XP range. It was offered in sedan and station wagon body-styles, replacing the short-lived XP series Falcon Futura sedan and Falcon Squire wagon models. A 200 cubic-inch (3.3-litre) six-cylinder engine, optional on the XP Falcon, was standard on the Fairmont.

The Fairmont has been through many incarnations since then, each one aligned with the contemporary Falcon series but usually with a better grade of interior and different exterior lights, front grille and other features.

In 1966 the new XR series Fairmont offered a V8 engine option. The XA series of 1972 marked the debut of a two-door hardtop body style. In 1976, the XC series saw further differentiation between Falcon and Fairmont styling with the latter equipped with large rectangular quartz halogen headlamps while the Falcon featured round headlamps. An additional top-of-the-line Fairmont GXL sedan was offered from 1976 in the XC series.

There was no two-door hardtop in the XD series that was launched in 1978 and the GXL badge was replaced by the Fairmont Ghia. The Ghia was, unlike the base Fairmont, offered in the sedan body-style only. For the XE series, Ford differentiated the Fairmont Ghia from both the Falcon and the base Fairmont by fitting it with larger headlamp assemblies that also incorporated driving lights, and a narrower radiator grille.

A Fairmont Ghia wagon was offered from 1986 with an update of the XF series, but discontinued in 1993 with the release of the ED Series. The EB series was the only model that Ford offered a V8 option in a Fairmont Ghia wagon, only 90 were built. The Fairmont wagon was discontinued in 2002 when the AU series gave way to the BA; the Futura was now the highest trim specification for the wagon.

The Fairmont's model life ended with the arrival of the FG Series Falcon range in 2008, when the Fairmont and Fairmont Ghia models were replaced by the Ford G6, G6E and G6E Turbo models. According to the then Ford Australia head Tom Gorman, the model code FG was chosen as a 'nod to the Fairmont Ghia'.

Between 1967 and 1978, Australian Ford Fairmont sedans and wagons were exported to the United Kingdom. Though large compared to models in Ford's European range, they had a reputation for reliability.

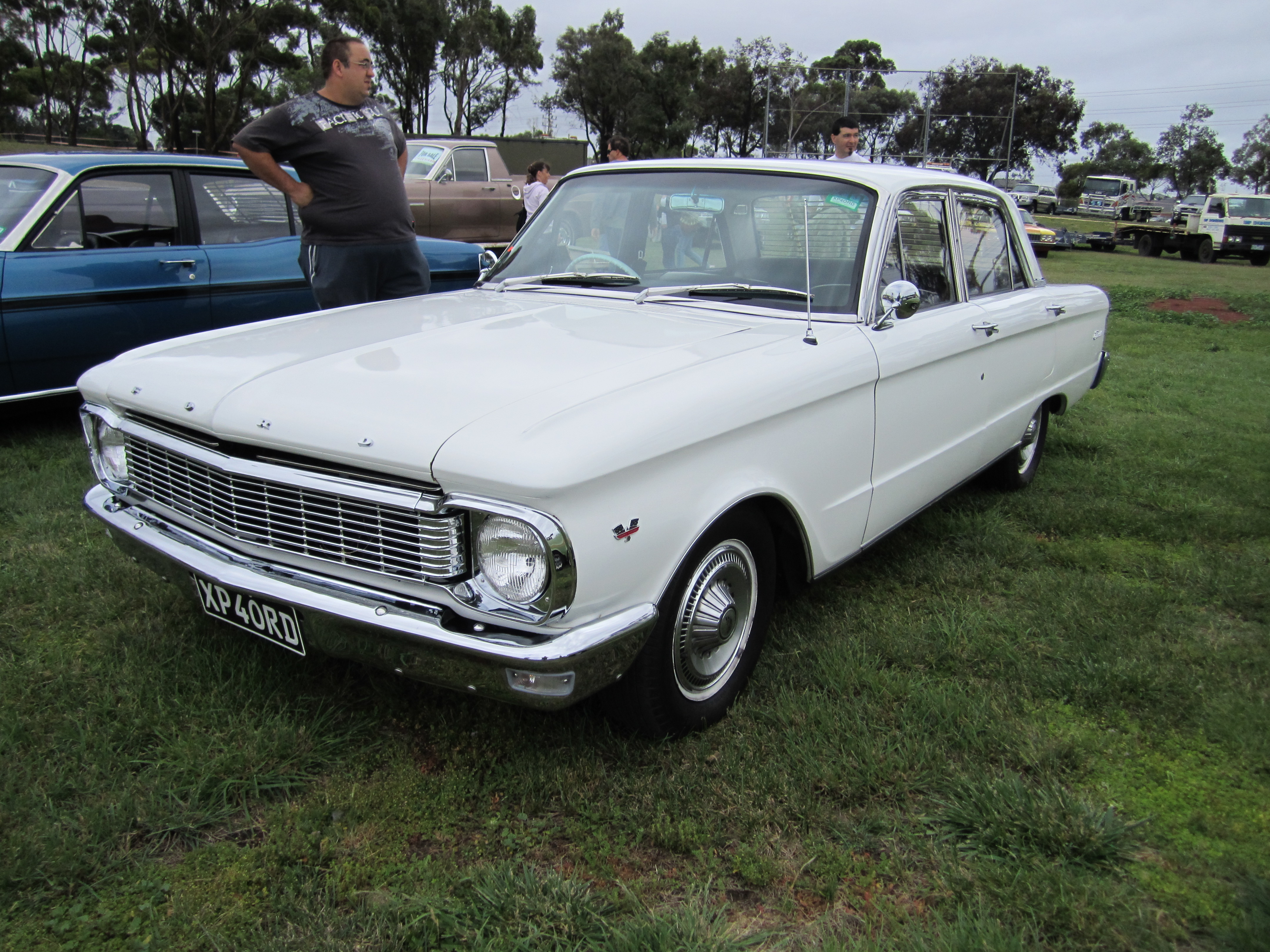
1965–1966 Ford Fairmont (XP) sedan

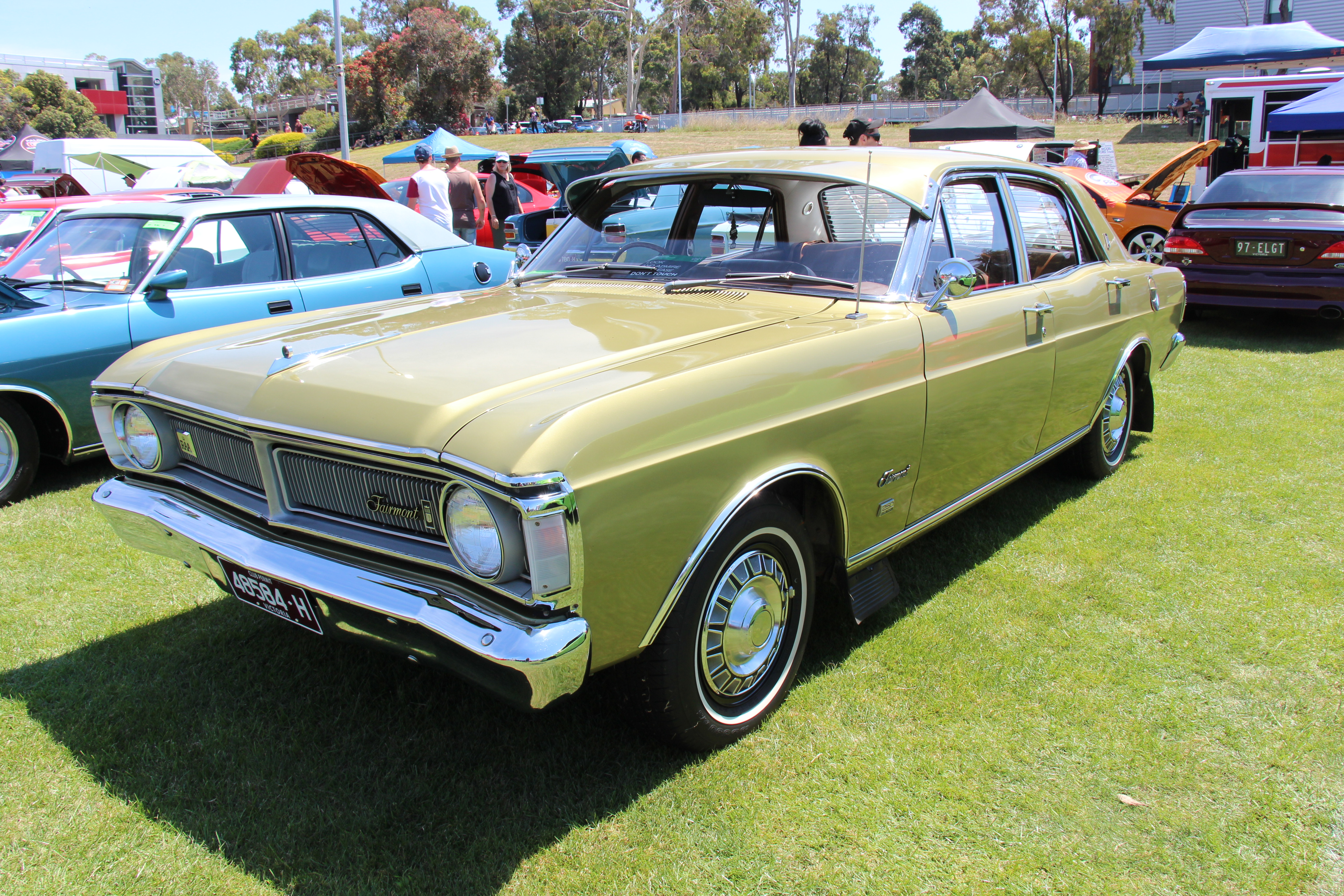
1970-1972 Ford Fairmont (XY) sedan

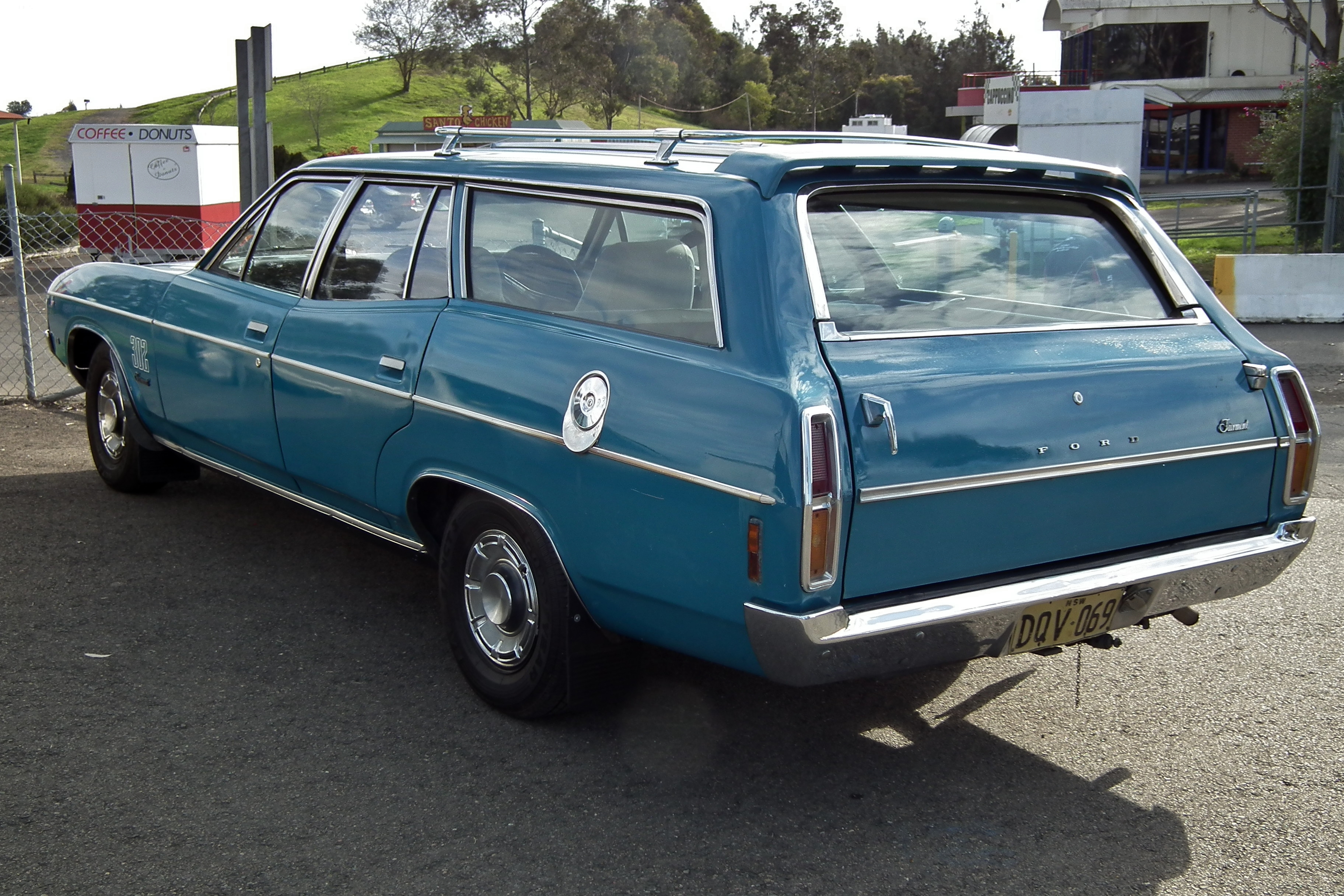
1972-1973 Ford Fairmont (XA) wagon

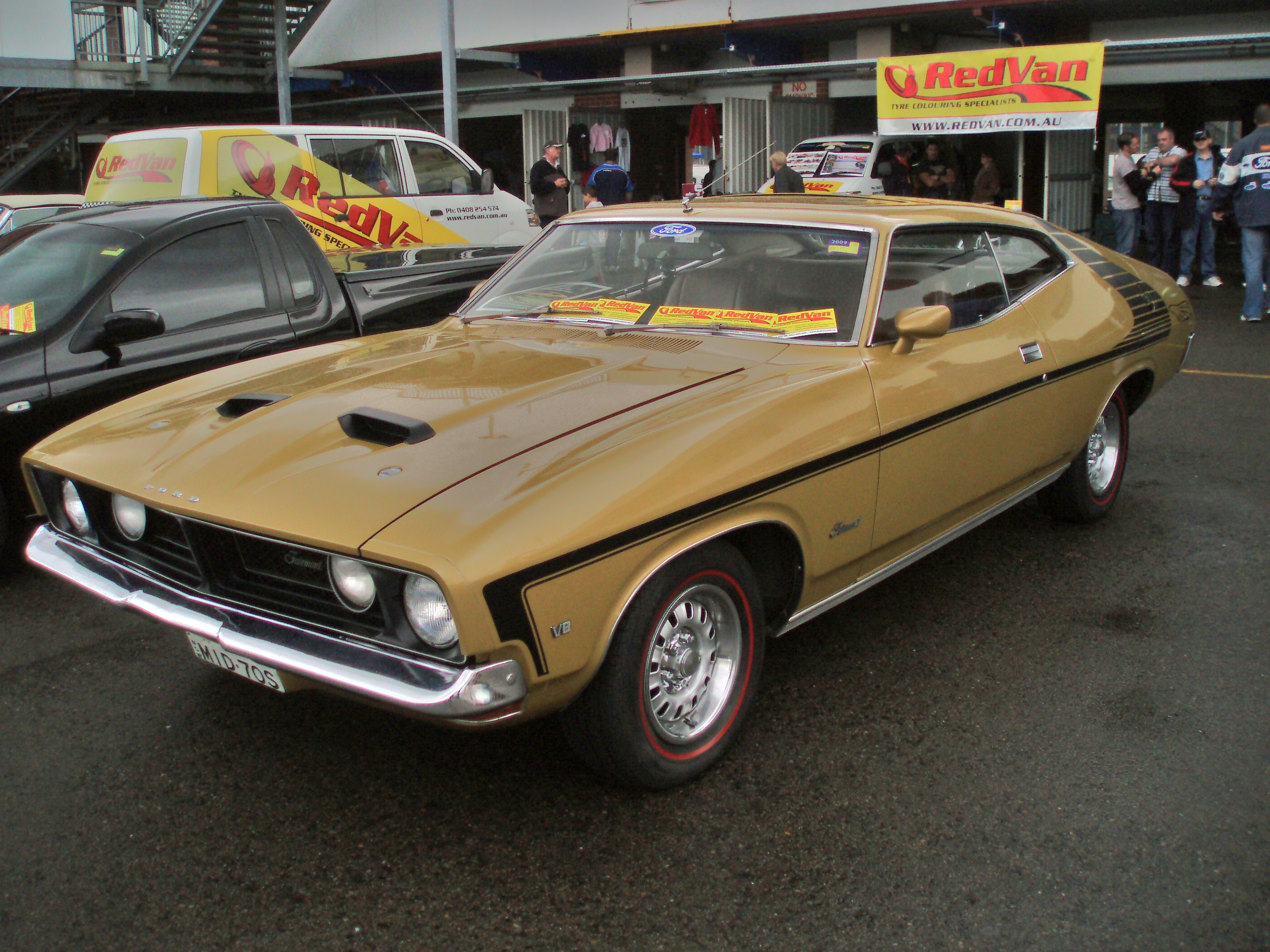
1973-1976 Ford Fairmont (XB) hardtop coupe.

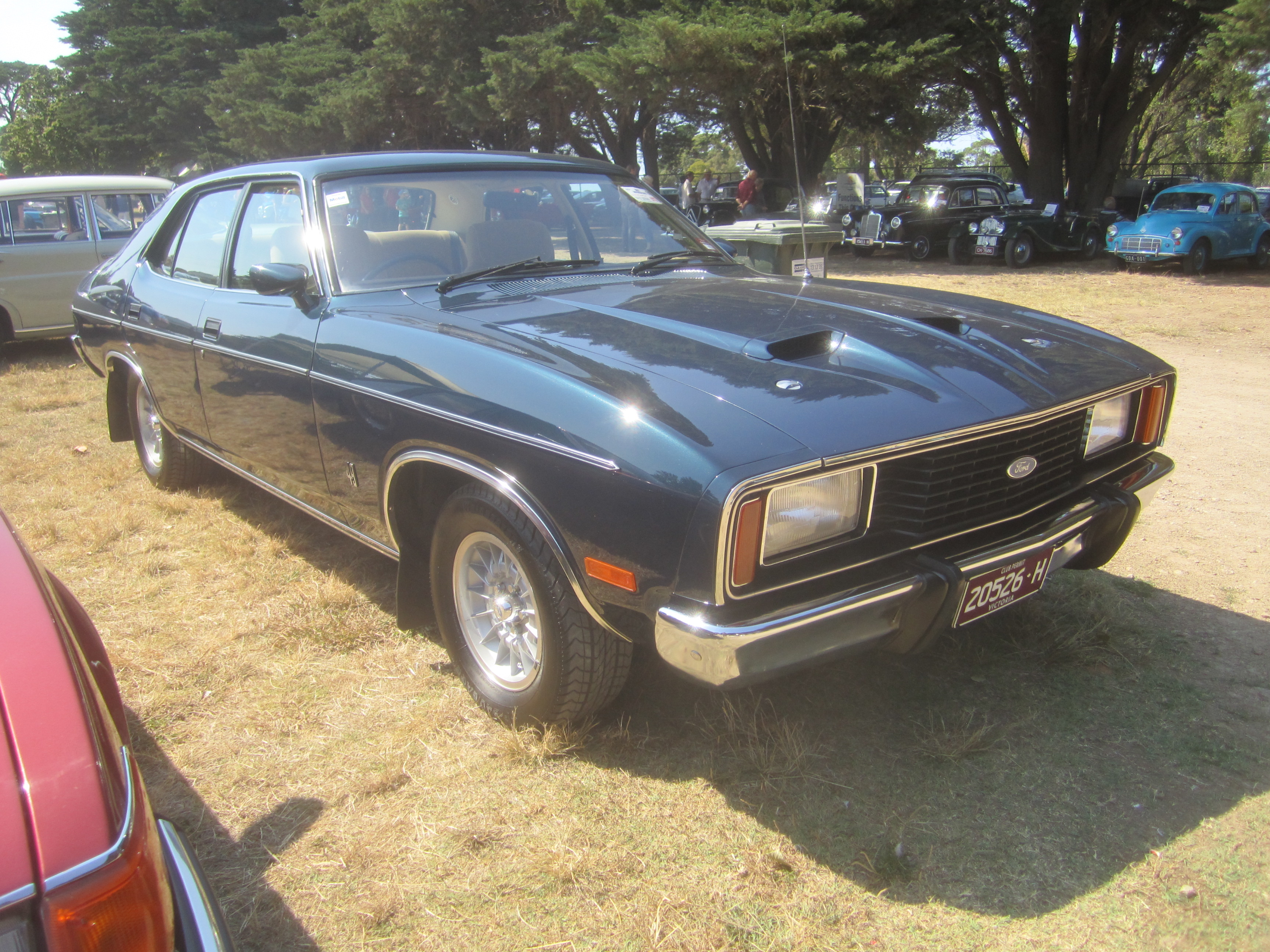
1976-1979 Ford Fairmont GXL (XC) sedan

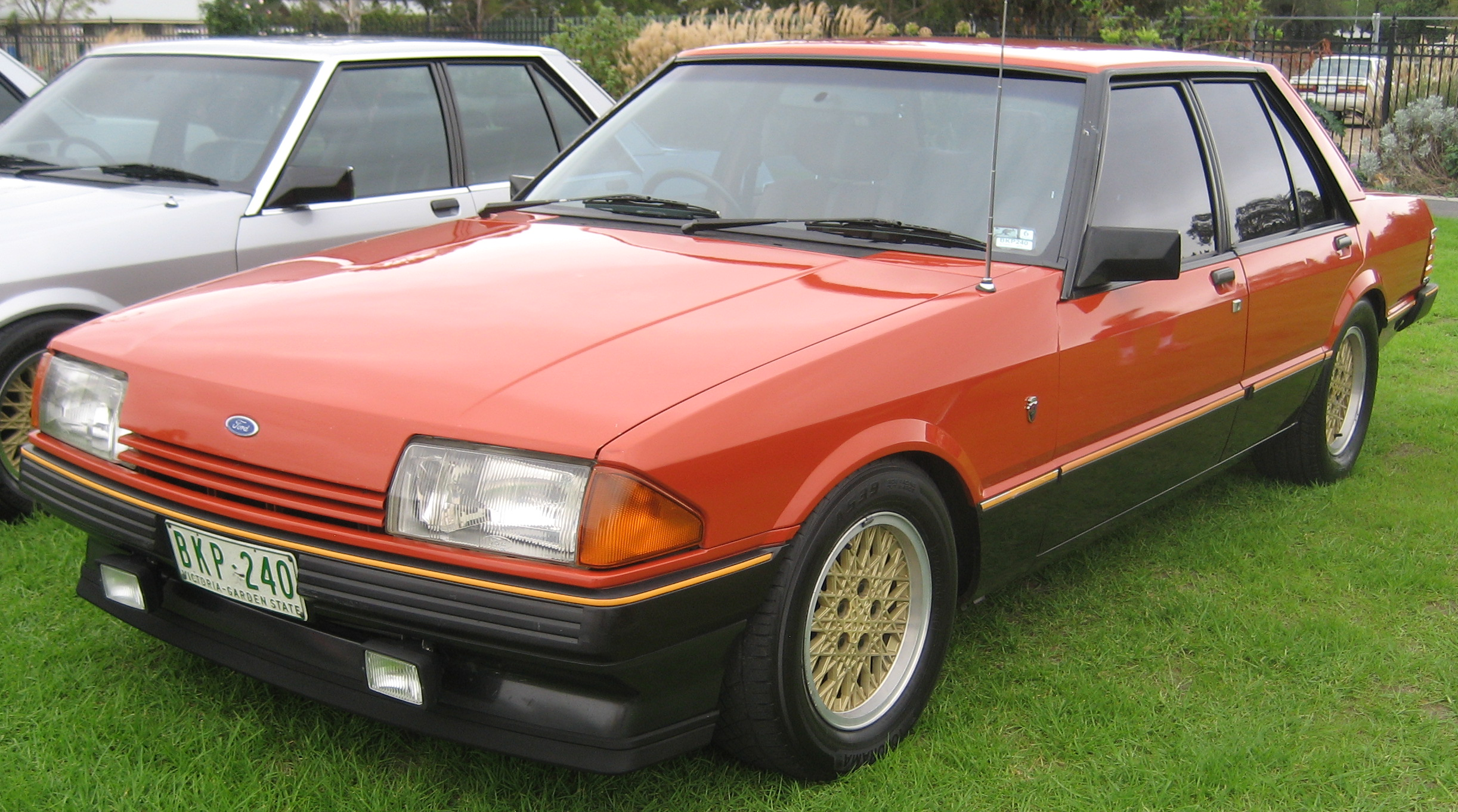
1982-1984 Ford Fairmont Ghia ESP (XE) sedan

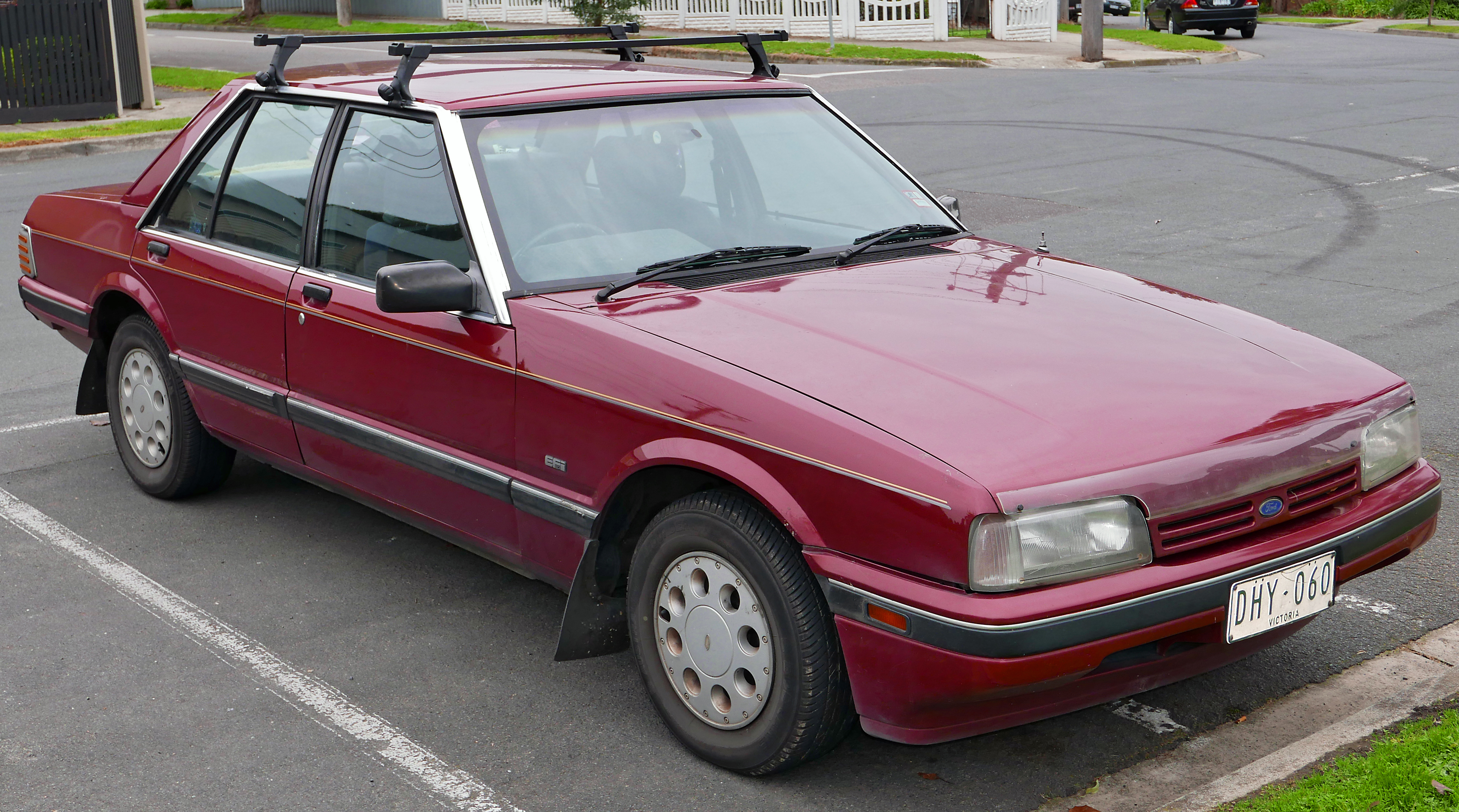
1984–1988 Ford Fairmont (XF) sedan

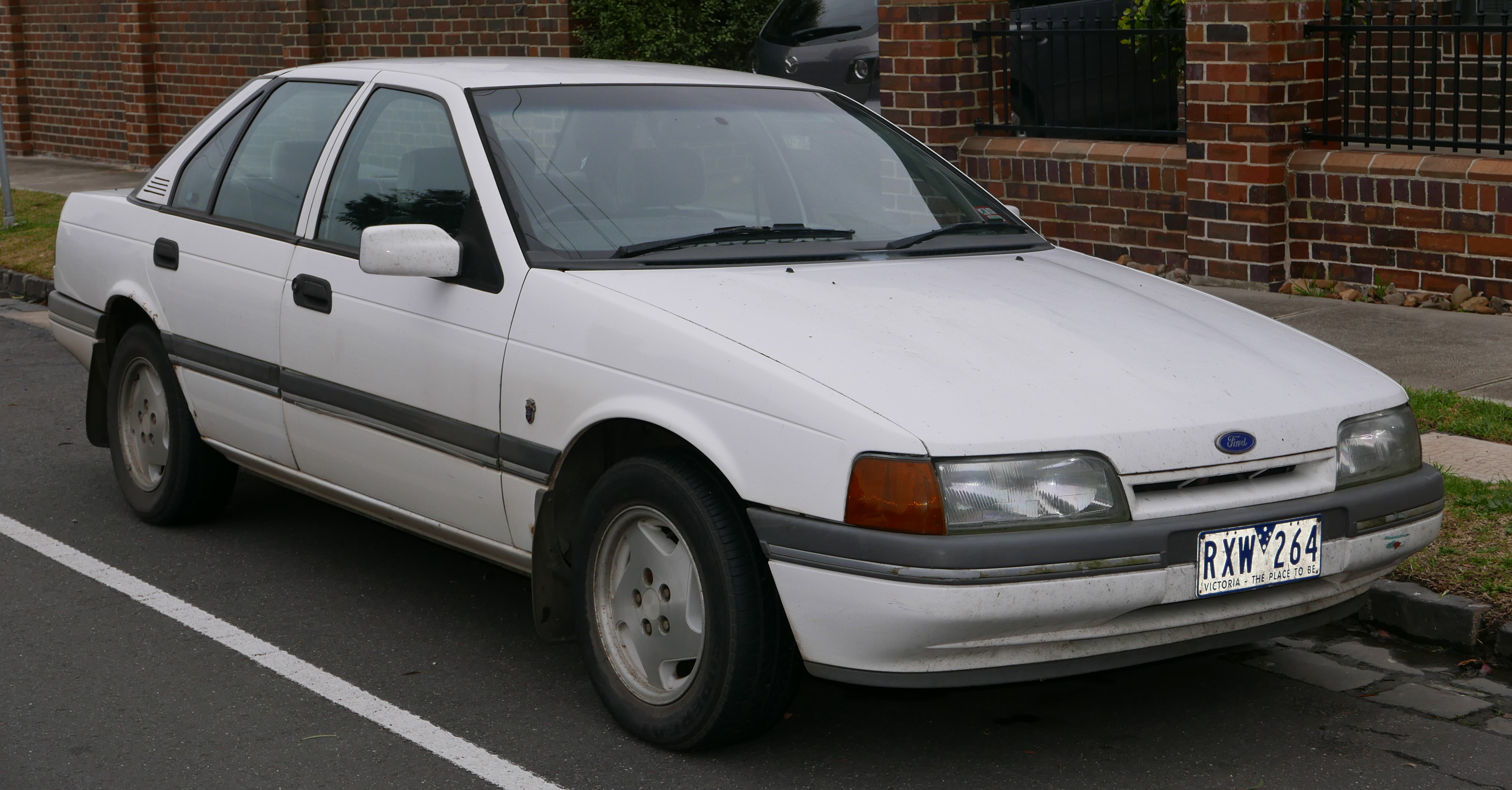
1989–1991 Ford Fairmont (EA II) Ghia sedan

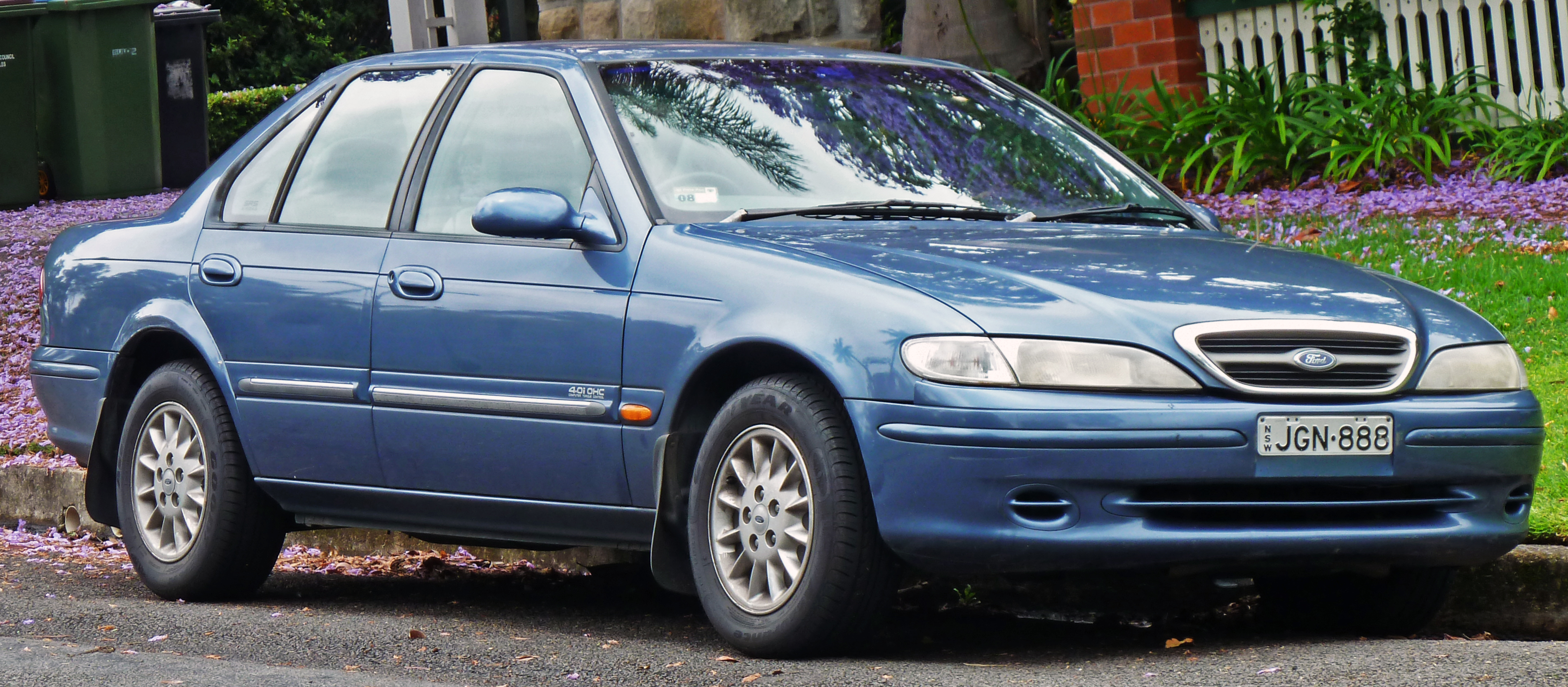
1996–1998 Ford Fairmont (EL) sedan

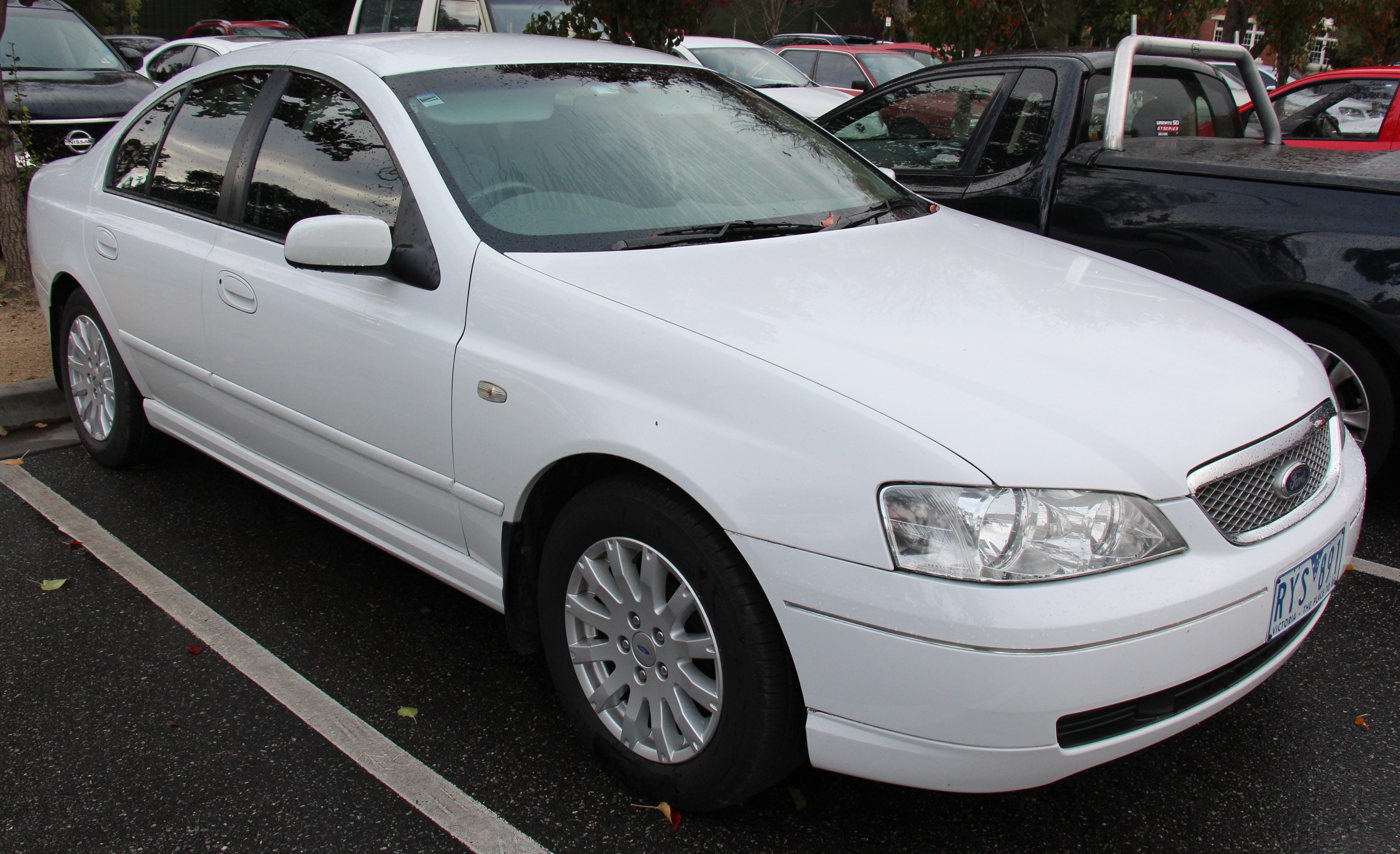
2002–2004 Ford Fairmont (BA) sedan

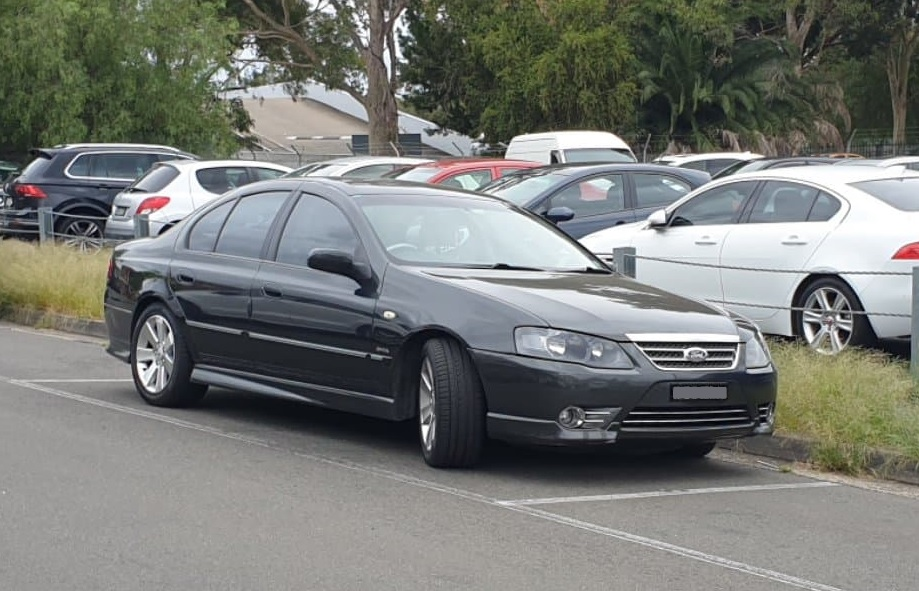
2006–2008 Ford Fairmont Ghia (BF II) sedan

== South Africa ==
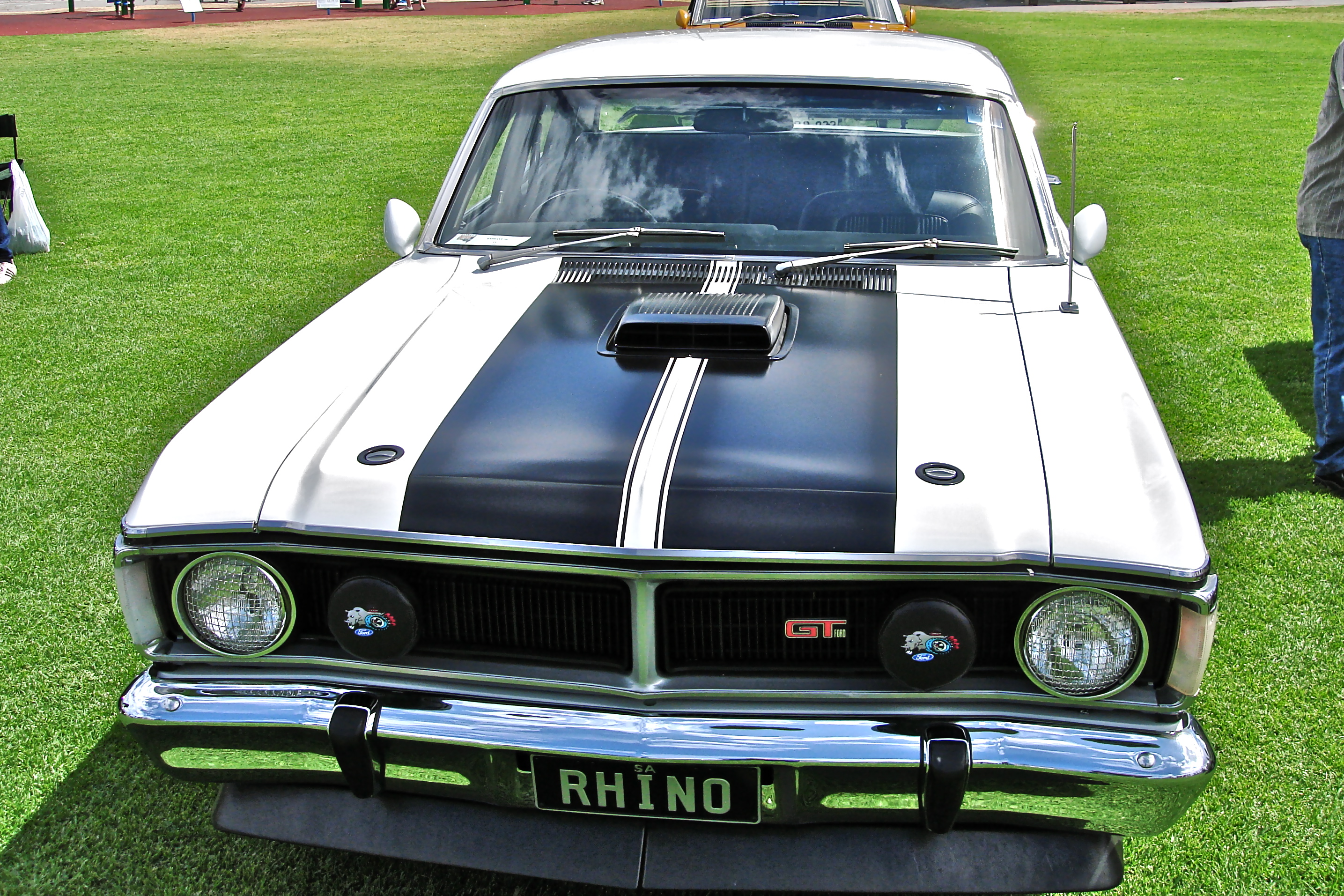
South African Ford Fairmont GT

In South Africa the XW and XY Ford Falcon series were assembled in Port Elizabeth, Eastern Cape from 1969 to 1972 and sold as Fairmonts. Two engines were available: a 250 cubic-inch six-cylinder and the 351 cubic-inch Cleveland V8. The Ranchero badge was used on the utility version. A switch from assembly to local production had been considered but was ruled out on cost grounds; the Fairmont was replaced by the locally built Granada.

Some South African Fairmonts were made as GT models. These cars had the same specifications as the Australian Falcon GT, but with some cosmetic differences, the main ones being that the side stripes had the Supa-Roo replaced by a Supa-Rhino and the dashboard gauges were in metric format. These cars are nicknamed "White Rhino" in the South African classic car scene.

== See also ==
- Ford Falcon
- Ford Fairlane
