= Fairmount Historic District (Califon, New Jersey) =

Historic district in New Jersey, United States

- U.S. National Register of Historic Places
- U.S. Historic district
- New Jersey Register of Historic Places
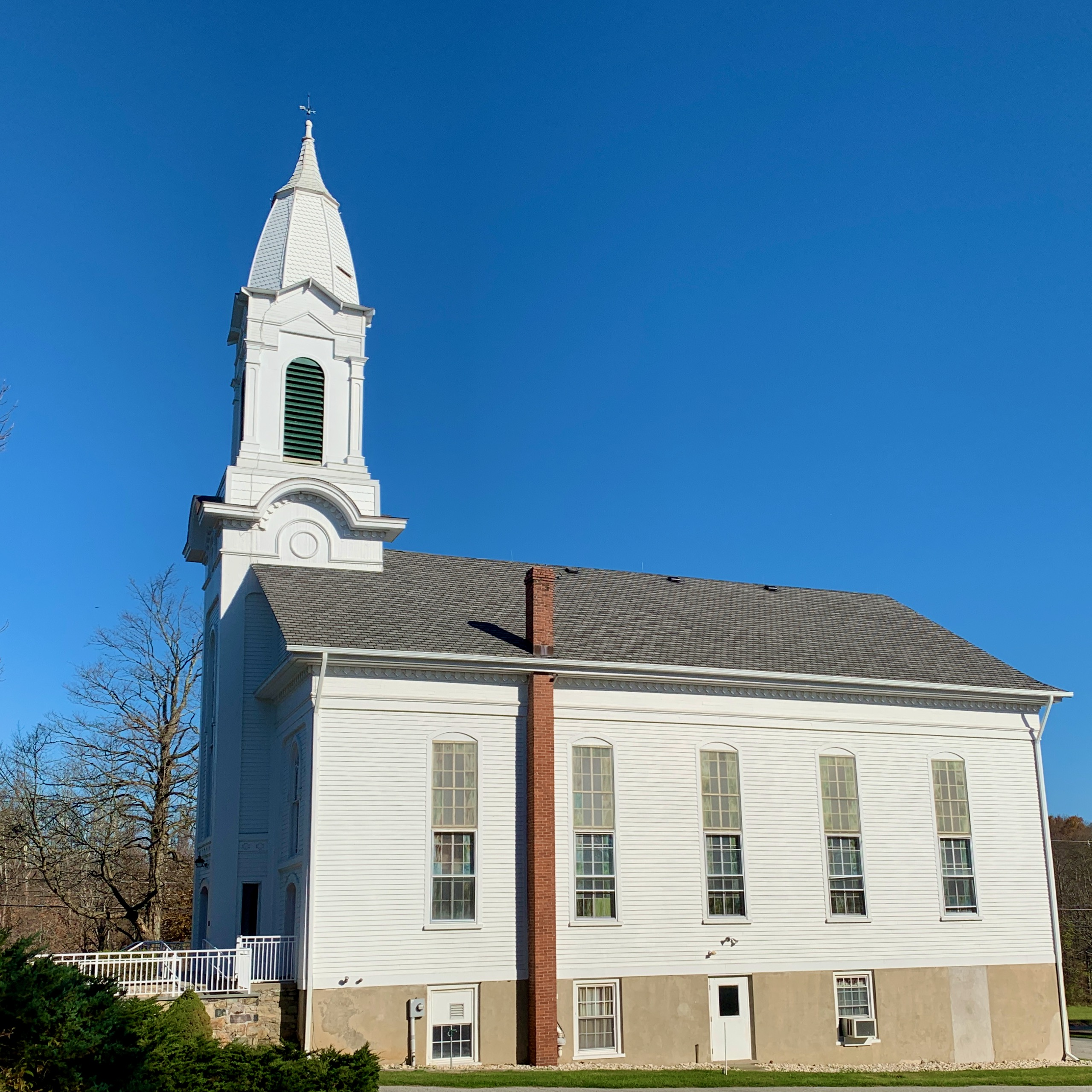
- Fairmount United Methodist Church

- Location within Hunterdon County, New Jersey Location within New Jersey Location within the United States
- Location: County Routes 517 and 512; Farmersville, Saw Mill, Hollow Brook, Wildwood, Fox Hill, and Beacon Light Roads, Fairmount, New Jersey
- Nearest city: Califon, New Jersey
- Coordinates: 40°43′8″N 74°46′30″W
- Area: 409 acres (166 ha)
- Architectural style: Queen Anne, Italianate, Greek Revival, Romanesque Revival
- NRHP reference No.: 96001470
- NJRHP No.: 3249

Significant dates
- Added to NRHP: December 20, 1996
- Designated NJRHP: October 23, 1996

The Fairmount Historic District is a 409-acre (166 ha) historic district located along County Route 517 in the Fairmount section of Tewksbury Township, near Califon, in Hunterdon County, New Jersey. It was added to the National Register of Historic Places on December 20, 1996 for its significance in architecture, exploration/settlement, and industry. The district includes 72 contributing buildings that were deemed to be contributing to the historic character of the area, plus five contributing structures, nine contributing sites, and one contributing object. One contributing building is located in Washington Township, Morris County.

== History ==
The Fairmount Presbyterian Church was founded in 1747 as a German Reformed congregation. By the 1880s, Fairmount had two churches, two stores, a sawmill, gristmill, schoolhouse, and the largest tannery in the county.

== Description ==
The Fairmount United Methodist Church was built in 1868 with Romanesque Revival and Italianate styles. The Fairmount Presbyterian Church was built from 1851 to 1852 with Greek Revival and Shingle styles. The small lime kiln dates to the nineteenth century. The house at 397 Fairmount Road, the single contributing property in Morris County, was built c. 1830–1850 with Greek Revival style.

== Gallery ==
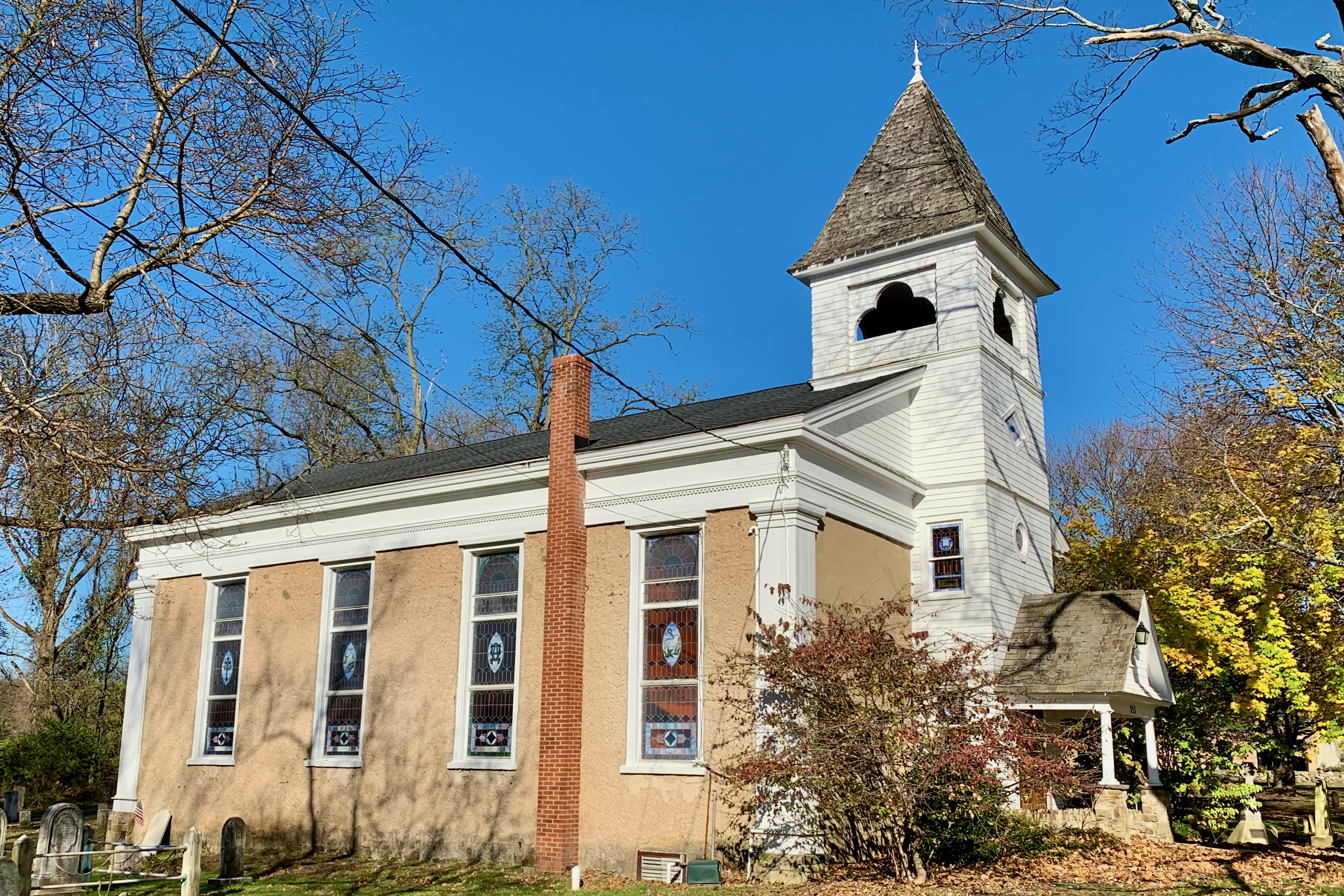
Fairmount Presbyterian Church

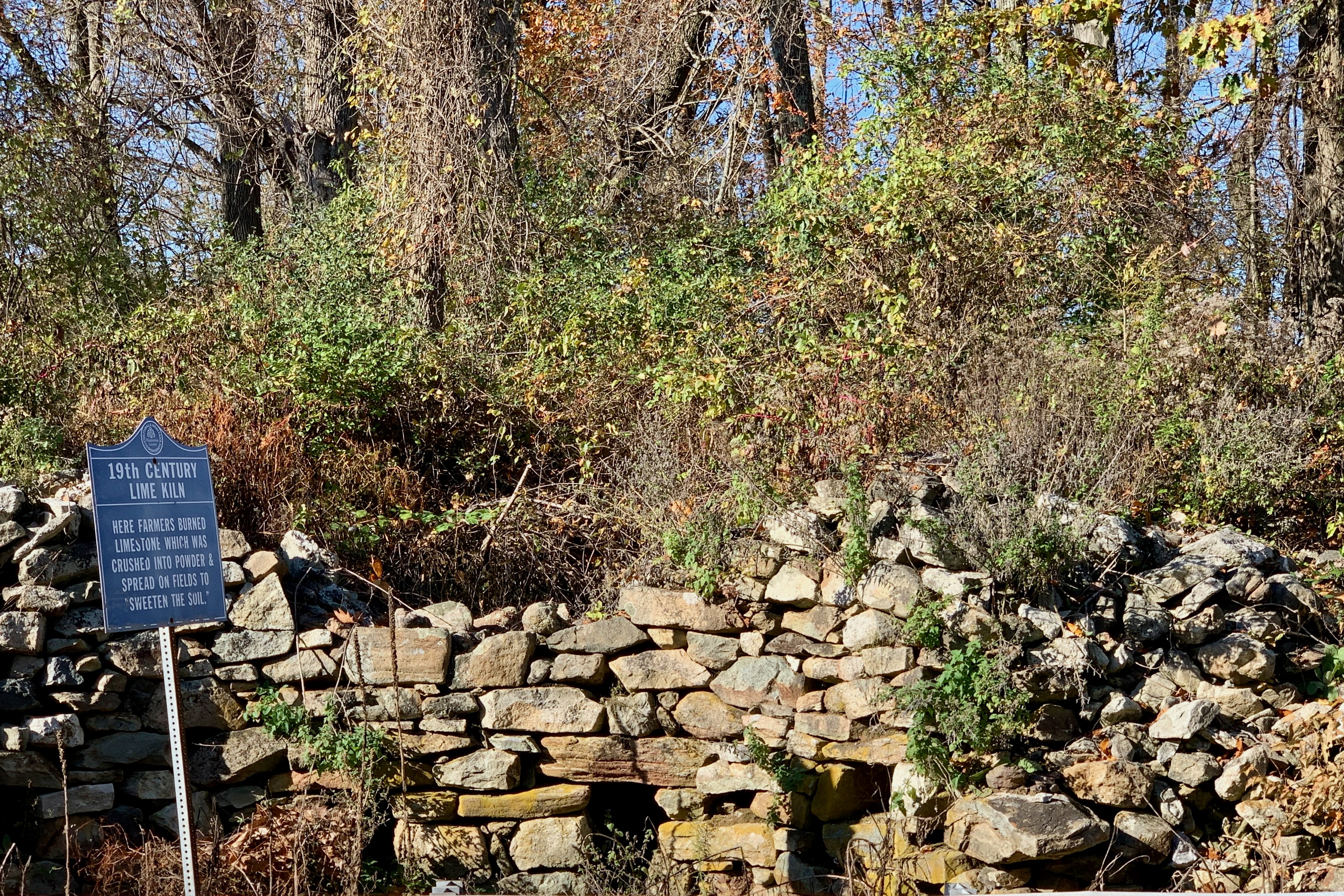
Lime kiln

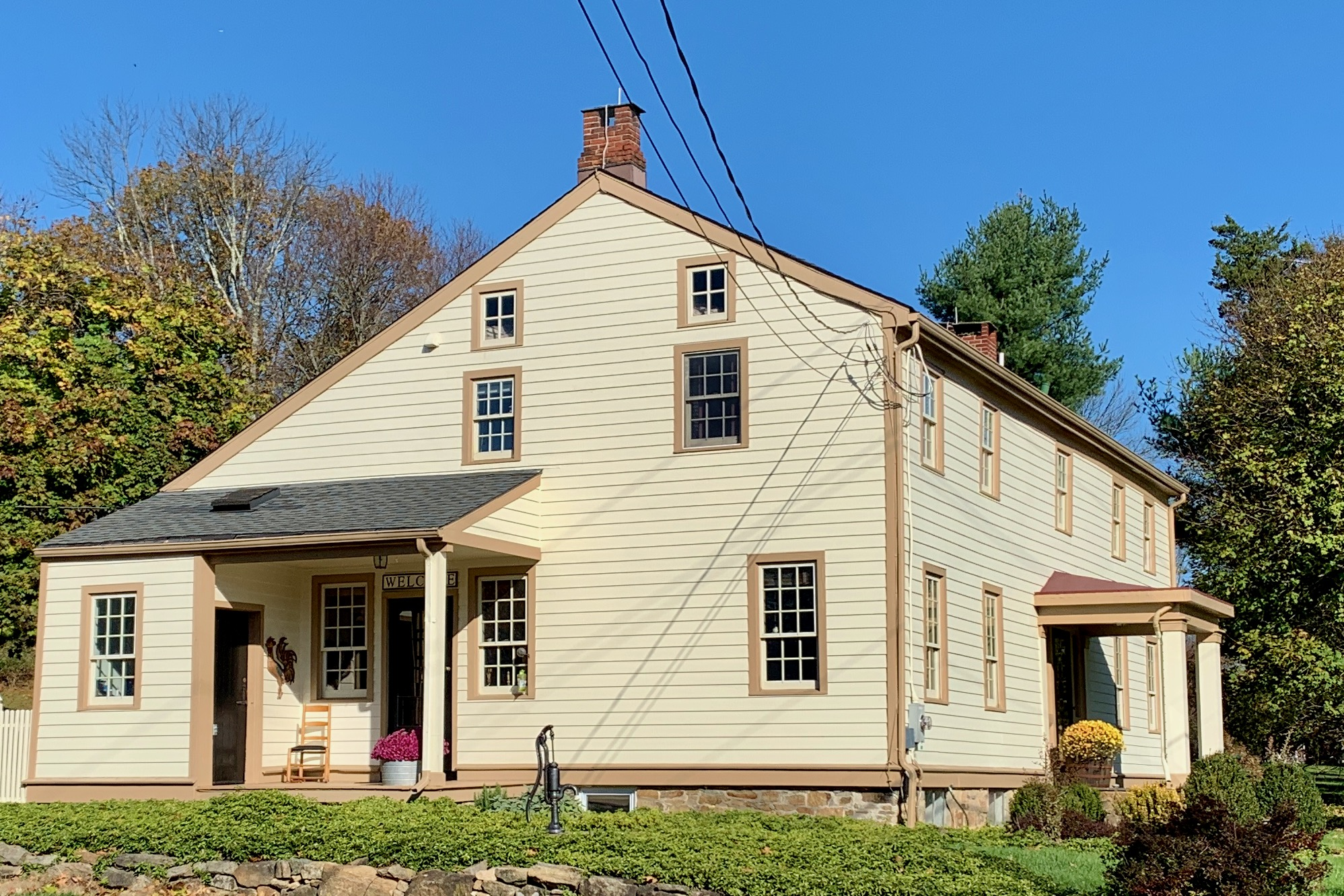
Greek Revival style house at 397 Fairmount Road

== See also ==
- National Register of Historic Places listings in Hunterdon County, New Jersey
- National Register of Historic Places listings in Morris County, New Jersey
