= Fairmount Avenue Historic District =

Historic district in Pennsylvania, United States

- U.S. National Register of Historic Places
- U.S. Historic district
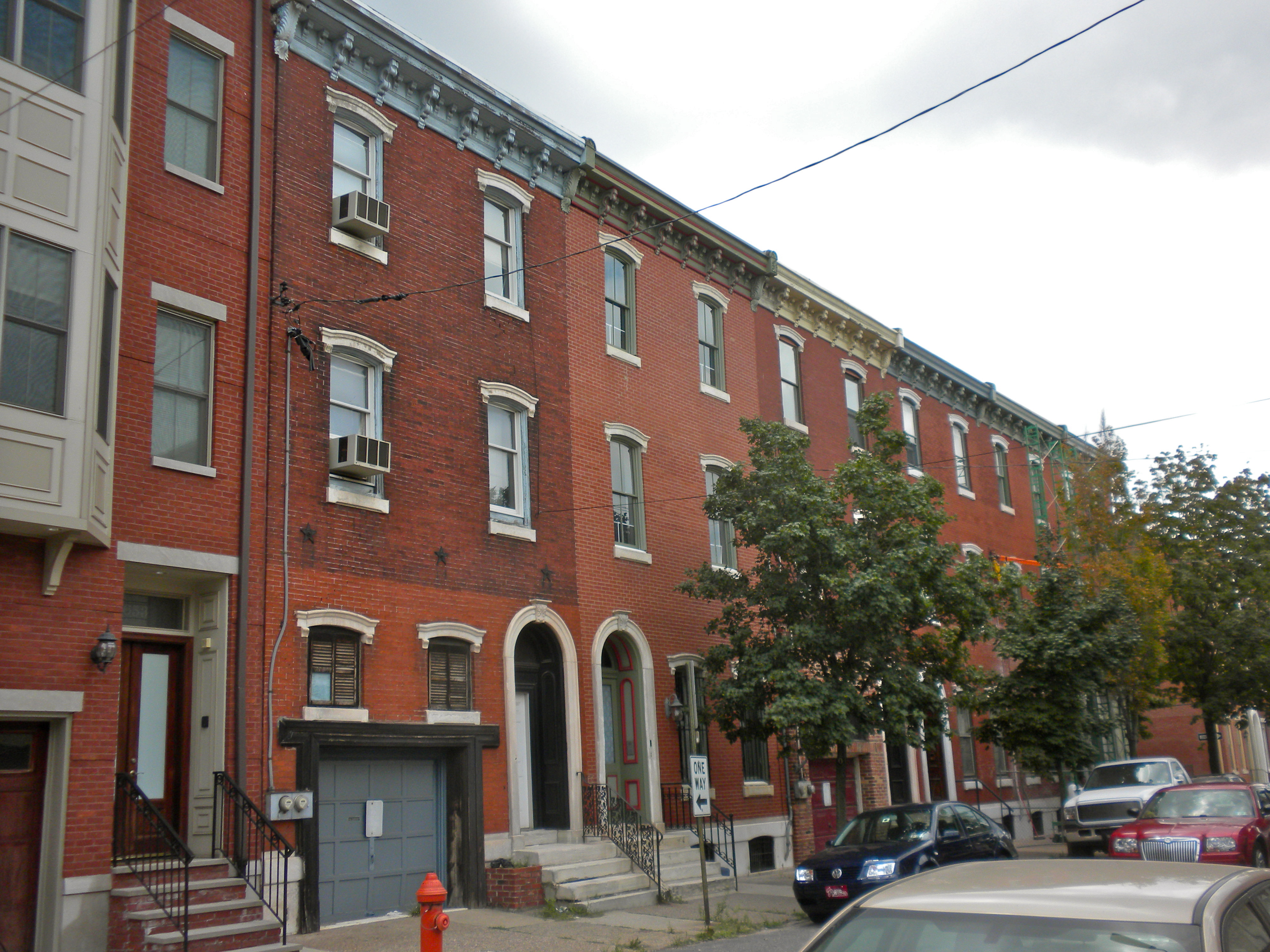
- 16th and F, Fairmount Avenue Historic District, August 2010

- Location within Philadelphia Location within Pennsylvania Location within the United States
- Location: Fairmount Ave., Melon St., North St., 15th St., 16th St., and 17th St., Philadelphia, Pennsylvania
- Coordinates: 39°58′00″N 75°09′44″W
- Area: 20 acres (8.1 ha)
- Architect: Baker and Dallett
- Architectural style: Late Victorian, Modern Movement, et al.
- NRHP reference No.: 02000066
- Added to NRHP: February 20, 2002

Fairmount Avenue Historic District is a national historic district located in the Spring Garden neighborhood of Philadelphia, Pennsylvania. It encompasses 75 contributing buildings and includes commercial, residential, and industrial properties. Residential buildings include mid- to late 19th-century vernacular Late Victorian rowhouses. Notable commercial and industrial buildings date to the early 20th century through 1930, and are in the early modern and Art Deco styles. Notable non-residential buildings include the A.F. Bernot and Brothers dye works (1900–01), Gaul, Derr, and Shearer building (1911, 1915), Security Elevator factory (1925), and the Alemite Lubricator Company offices (1925).

It was added to the National Register of Historic Places in 2002.

== Definition ==
The boundaries and restrictions of the district were defined by City Council on May 2, 2002.
