= Fairmont Hot Springs, British Columbia =

Resort community in Canada

Coordinates: 50.317°N 115.867°W

Location of Fairmont Hot Springs in British Columbia

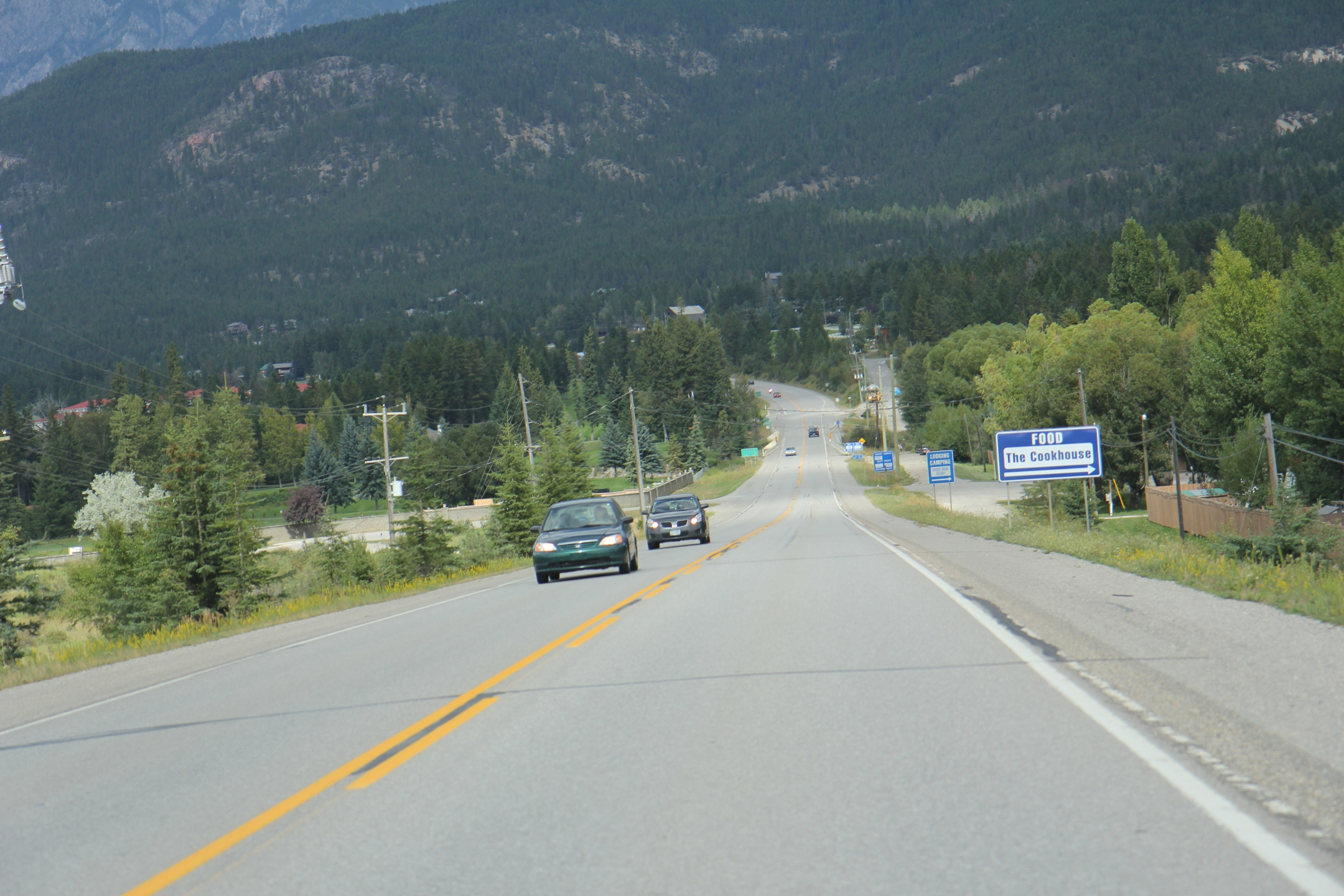
Looking northerly in Fairmont Hot Springs, BC

Fairmont Hot Springs is an unincorporated resort community located in south-eastern British Columbia, Canada commonly referred to as Fairmont. The community had a reported population of 781 in the 2021 census. The town is considered a tourist destination by some. The local resort is centered around a soak pool and swimming pool fed by natural mineral hot springs. The original springs building, surrounded by hot spring water seeping out of the ground, still stands.

The community contains three golf courses: Mountainside and Riverside are 18-hole courses, while Creekside is a family-oriented 9-hole par 3. In the winter, the area is also home to a small downhill ski area, with three lifts (one triple chair, one magic carpet and one platter lift), 13 runs and a tube park, as well as numerous cross-country trails. Fairmont Hot Springs has a strip mall including a market, restaurants, and a gift shop. Fairmont Hot Springs is home to the Dutch Creek Hoodoos, which are sandstone cliffs (hoodoos) with hiking trails located next to Dutch Creek, a source of the Columbia River and formerly a salmon breeding stream. Fairmont provides the only road access to Columbia Lake Provincial Park, five kilometers south. Fairmont Hot Springs Airport is located there.

On July 15, 2012, a mudslide occurred in Fairmont Hot Springs. A small creek that runs throughout the town formed a natural dam and backup water built up. Several homes were evacuated along with a golf course and many people were airlifted to safety.

To the north are Invermere, Windermere, Athalmer, Wilmer, Radium, Edgewater, and Golden. To the south are Canal Flats, Scookumchuck, Kimberley, and Cranbrook.

== Fairmont Hot Springs Resort ==
Fairmont Hot Springs Resort is the biggest employer in Fairmont Hot Springs. The resort boasts a hotel, two campgrounds, 3 golf courses, a ski-hill, several hot springs swimming pools, a spa, water and sewer utility plants, 668 acres of undeveloped property and more.

=== Resort Ownership ===
1957: Lloyd and Earl Wilder, and a group of investors purchased the resort.

1965 - 2006: Lloyd Wilder becomes sole owner of the resort. The resort is managed by the Wilder family for many years.

Sept 2006 - June 2023: Ken Fowler Enterprises.

June 2023 - Present: Aldestra Hotel Group.

== 2021 Census ==
The 2021 census reported a population of 781 people, a 37% increase in population from 2016, when the population was 571. The average age of the population in 2021 was 52.3 years old, notably older than the 2021 national average age of 41.7 years old.

Only 50% of the private homes in Fairmont are permanently occupied.

== Images ==
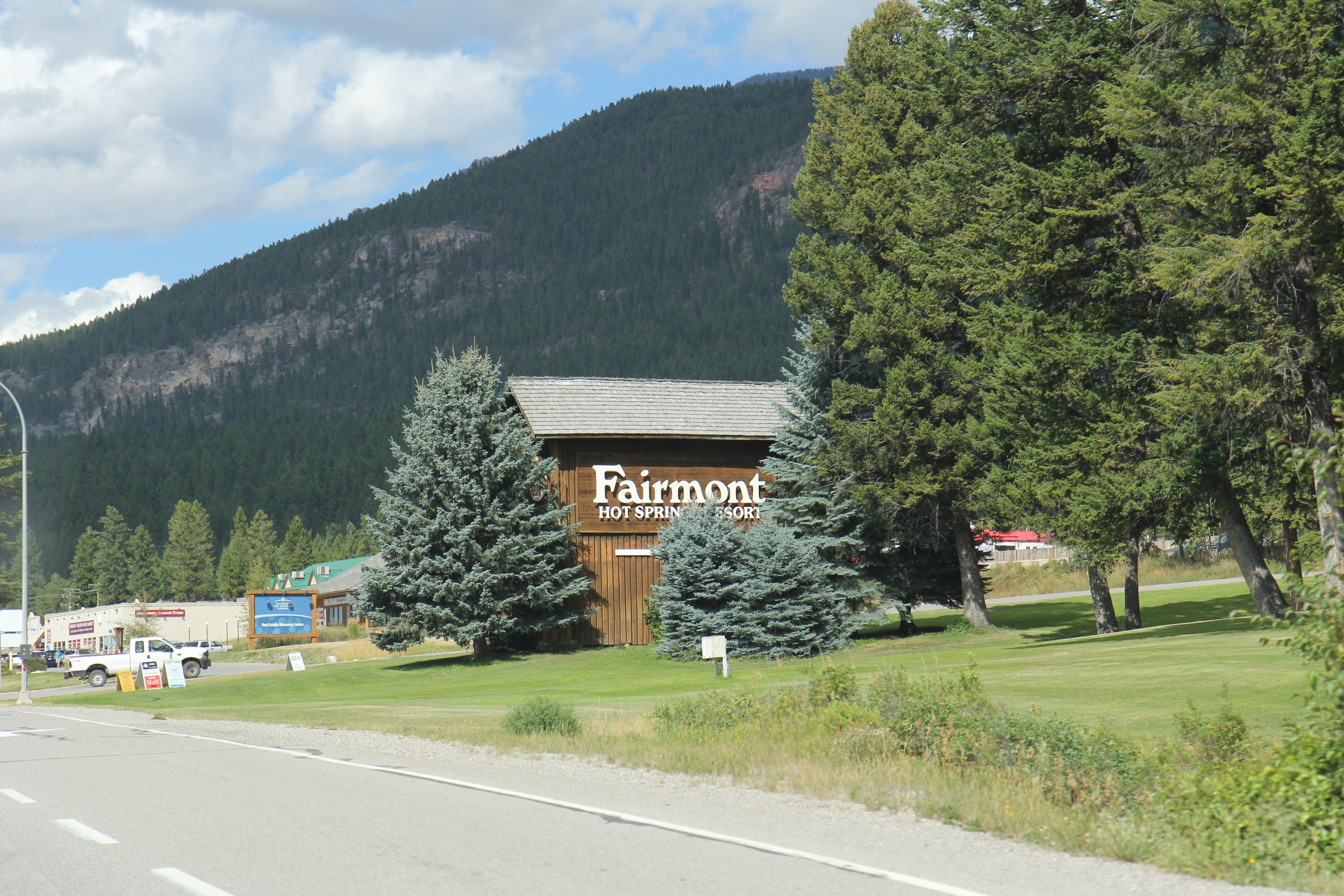
Fairmont Hot Springs Resort entrance

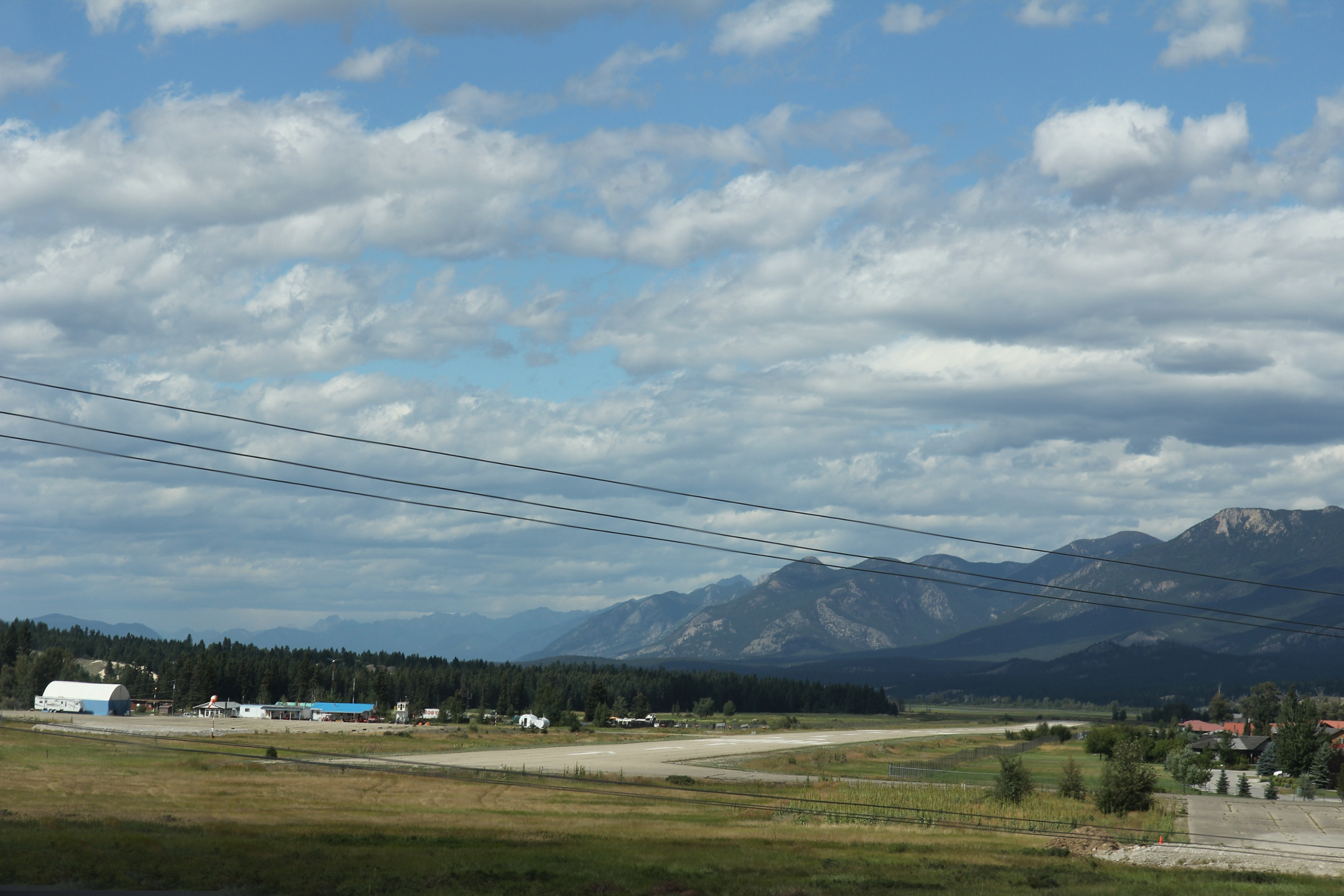
Fairmont Hot Springs Airport

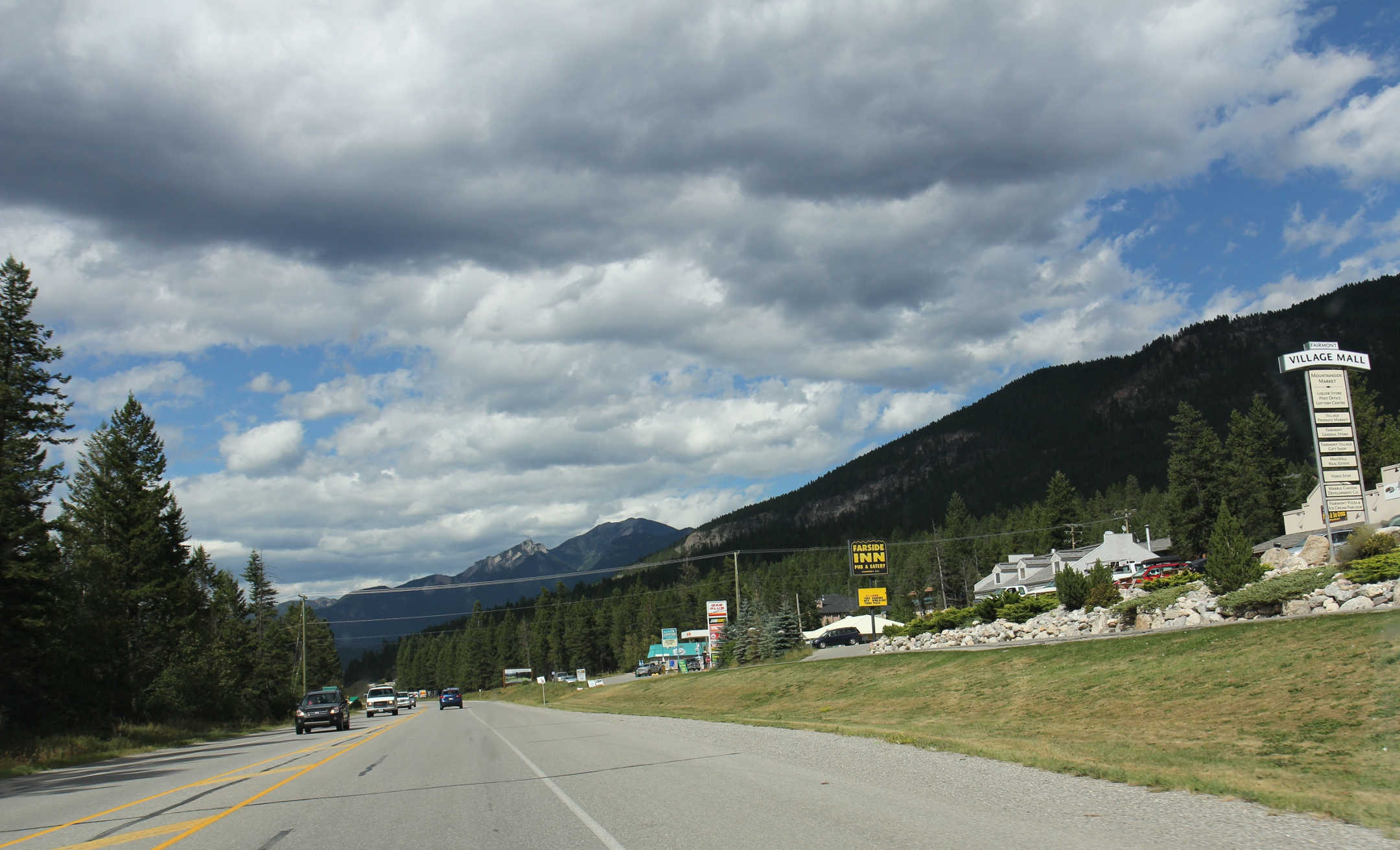
Business district

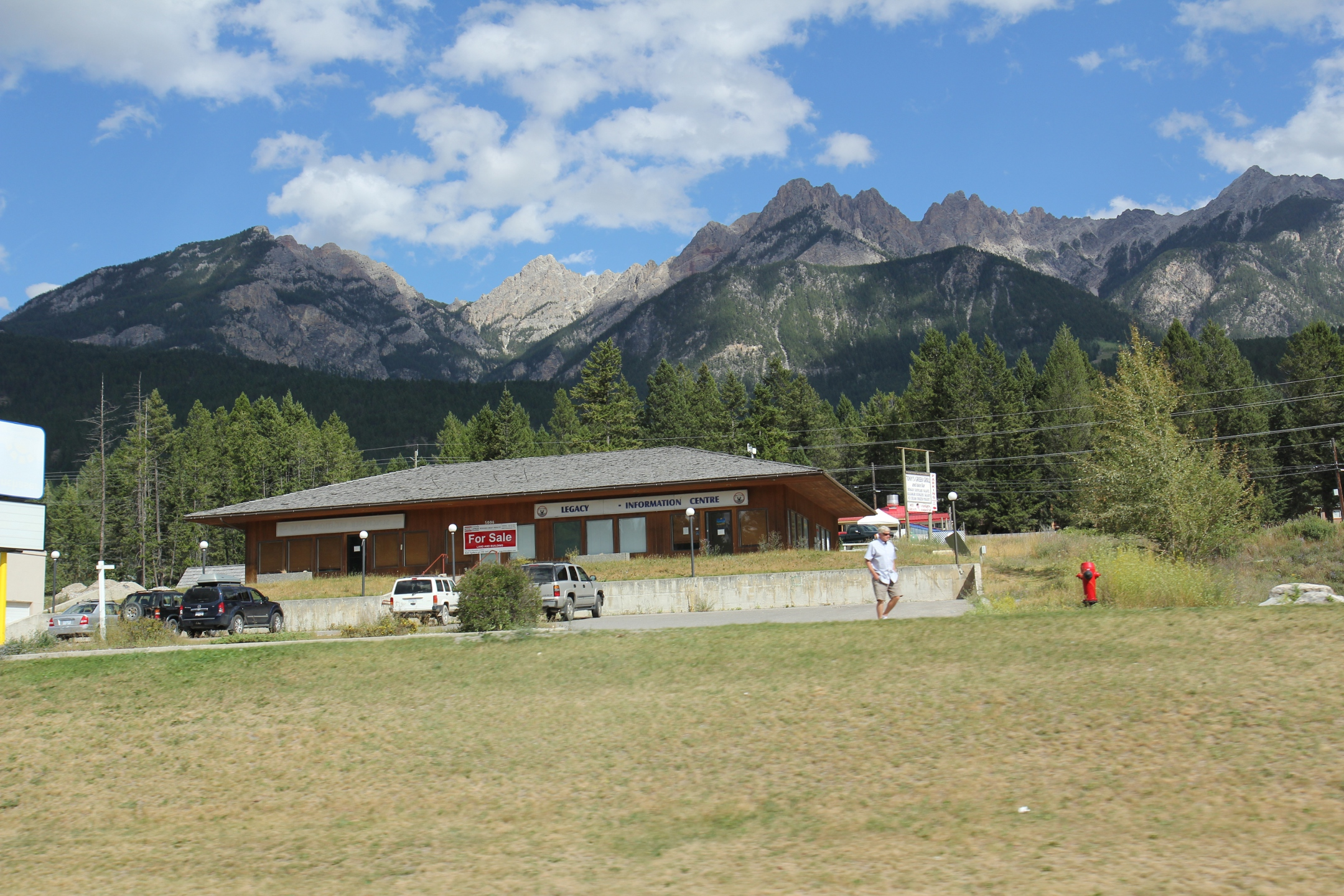
Information Centre
