= Kootenay-Rockies =

Provincial electoral district in British Columbia, Canada

British Columbia electoral district
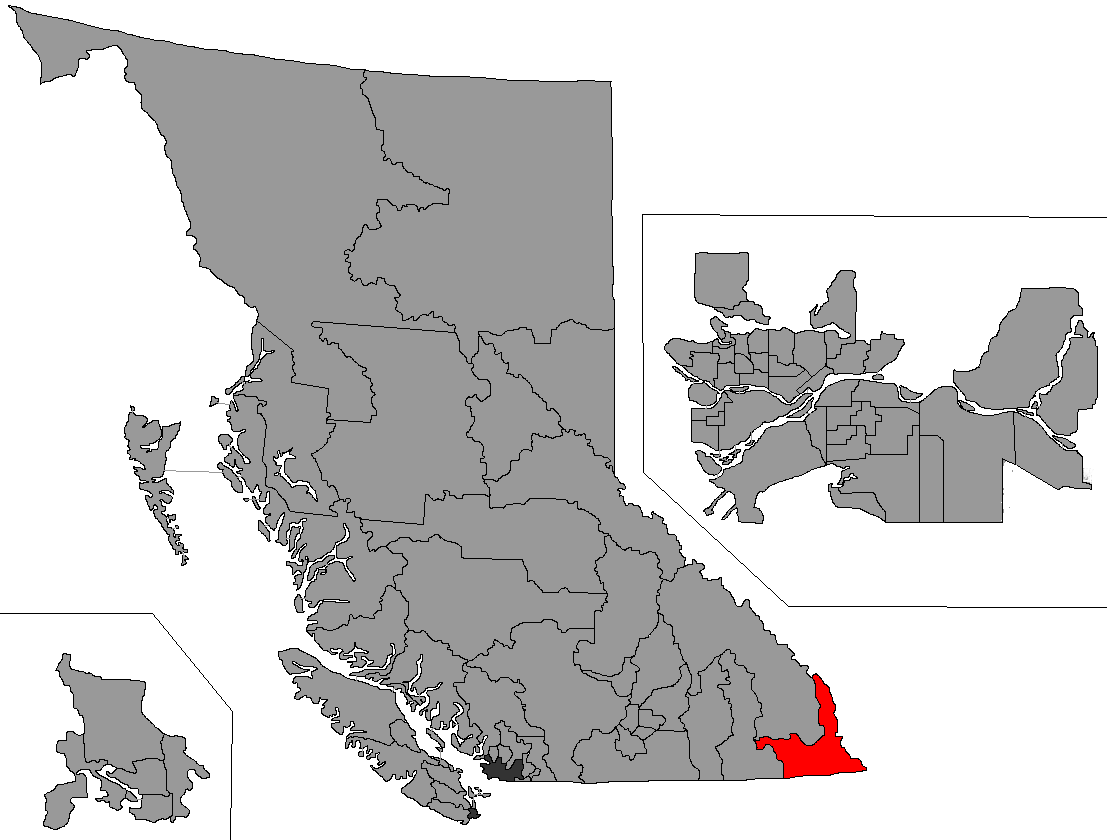

Provincial electoral district
- Legislature: Legislative Assembly of British Columbia
MLA
Pete Davis
Conservative
- District created: 1966
- First contested: 1966
- Last contested: 2026

Demographics
- Population (2001): 38,503
- Area (km²): 10,275
- Pop. density (per km²): 3.7
- Census division: Regional District of East Kootenay
- Census subdivision(s): Cranbrook, Fernie, Sparwood, Elkford

Kootenay-Rockies (formerly Kootenay from 1966 to 2001; East Kootenay from 2001 to 2009; Kootenay East from 2009 to 2024) is a provincial electoral district for the Legislative Assembly of British Columbia, Canada.

The district was created before the 1966 election by the merger of Cranbrook and Fernie ridings, and despite its long period under the "Kootenay" moniker, never extended to cover more than a fraction of the whole "Kootenay" region. Post-2001, broadly similar territory was included under the successive names East Kootenay, Kootenay East and Kootenay-Rockies. The riding adopted its current name and had minor boundary changes from the 2024 election, which implemented the results of the 2021 redistribution.

== Demographics ==
| Population, 2001 | 38,503 |
| Population change, 1996–2001 | 0.7% |
| Area (km^{2}) | 10,275 |
| Population density (people per km^{2}) | 3.7 |

== Geography ==
As of the 2020 provincial election, Kootenay East comprised the southern portion of the Regional District of East Kootenay. It is located in southeastern British Columbia and is bordered by Alberta to the east and Montana, United States to the south. Communities in the electoral district consist of Cranbrook, Fernie, Sparwood, and Elkford.

== History ==
=== 2008 redistribution ===
The 2008 electoral redistribution saw the addition of St. Mary's Indian reserve and a name change from East Kootenay to Kootenay East.

=== 1999 redistribution ===
The 1999 electoral redistribution saw a small addition to the western border and a name change from Kootenay to East Kootenay.

== Members of the Legislative Assembly ==
Its MLA is Tom Shypitka. He was first elected in 2017. This riding has elected the following MLAs:

| Assembly | Years | Member | Party |
|---|---|---|---|
Kootenay; Riding created from Cranbrook and Fernie
| 28th | 1966–1969 | Leo Nimsick | New Democratic |
| 29th | 1969–1972 | Leo Nimsick | New Democratic |
| 30th | 1972–1975 | Leo Nimsick | New Democratic |
| 31st | 1975–1979 | George Wayne Haddad | Social Credit |
| 32nd | 1979–1983 | Terry Segarty | Social Credit |
| 33rd | 1983–1986 | Terry Segarty | Social Credit |
| 34th | 1986–1991 | Anne Edwards | New Democratic |
| 35th | 1991–1996 | Anne Edwards | New Democratic |
| 36th | 1996–2001 | Erda Walsh | New Democratic |
East Kootenay
| 37th | 2001–2005 | Bill Bennett | Liberal |
| 38th | 2005–2009 | Bill Bennett | Liberal |
Kootenay East
| 39th | 2009–2013 | Bill Bennett | Liberal |
| 40th | 2013–2017 | Bill Bennett | Liberal |
| 41st | 2017–2020 | Tom Shypitka | Liberal |
| 42nd | 2020–2023 | Tom Shypitka | Liberal |
| 42nd | 2023–2024 | Tom Shypitka | BC United |
Kootenay-Rockies
| 43rd | 2024–2026 | Pete Davis | Conservative |
| 44th | 2026–present | Pete Davis | Conservative |

== Election results ==
Graph of provincial election results in Kootenay East (minor parties are summed up as "Others")

=== Kootenay-Rockies ===
2026 British Columbia general election
** Preliminary results — Not yet official **
| Party | Candidate | Votes | % | ±% |
|---|---|---|---|---|
| Conservative | Pete Davis | 9,130 | 56.32 | +13.61 |
| New Democratic | Norma Blissett | 4,404 | 27.17 | +5.42 |
| Green | Keenan Dennehy | 1,165 | 7.19 | +2.01 |
| OneBC | AJ Wolfe | 866 | 5.34 | – |
| CentreBC | Paul Heywood | 647 | 3.99 | – |
| Total valid votes | | 16,212 | 99.83 | |
| Total rejected ballots | | 27 | 0.17 | +0.06 |
| Turnout | | 16,239 | | |
| Registered voters | | | | |
Source: Elections BC
| Conservative hold | | Swing | | +4.10 |

2024 British Columbia general election
| Party | Candidate | Votes | % | ±% | Expenditures |
|---|---|---|---|---|---|
| Conservative | Pete Davis | 8,217 | 42.71 | – | $66,181.76 |
| Independent | Tom Shypitka | 5,844 | 30.37 | -27.0 | $33,456.11 |
| New Democratic | Sam Atwal | 4,184 | 21.75 | -11.2 | $23,254.71 |
| Green | Kerri Wall | 996 | 5.18 | -4.6 | $11,054.43 |
| Total valid votes/expense limit | | 19,241 | 99.89 | – | $71,700.08 |
| Total rejected ballots | | 21 | 0.11 | – | |
| Turnout | | 19,262 | 60.79 | – | |
| Registered voters | | 31,684 | | | |
| Conservative notional gain from BC United | | Swing | | +34.9 (Note: Swing against BC United incumbent Tom Shypitka, standing for re-election as an independent candidate.) | |
Source: Elections BC

2020 provincial election redistributed results
| Party | % |
|---|---|
| Liberal | 57.4 |
| New Democratic | 32.9 |
| Green | 9.8 |

=== Kootenay East ===
2020 British Columbia general election: Kootenay East
| Party | Candidate | Votes | % | ±% | Expenditures |
|---|---|---|---|---|---|
| Liberal | Tom Shypitka | 9,897 | 57.90 | +1.33 | $38,182.15 |
| New Democratic | Wayne Stetski | 5,499 | 32.17 | +2.5 | $19,605.32 |
| Green | Kerri Wall | 1,697 | 9.93 | −1.34 | $3,805.90 |
| Total valid votes | | 17,093 | 100.00 | – | |
| Total rejected ballots | | | | | |
| Turnout | | | | | |
| Registered voters | | | | | |
Source: Elections BC

2017 British Columbia general election: Kootenay East
| Party | Candidate | Votes | % | ±% | Expenditures |
|---|---|---|---|---|---|
| Liberal | Tom Shypitka | 9,666 | 56.57 | −6.42 | $53,655 |
| New Democratic | Randal Macnair | 5,070 | 29.67 | −7.34 | $34,336 |
| Green | Yvonne Marie Prest | 1,926 | 11.27 | – | $2,412 |
| Libertarian | Keith D. Komar | 425 | 2.49 | – | $2,027 |
| Total valid votes | | 17,087 | 100.00 | | |
| Total rejected ballots | | 101 | 0.59 | | |
| Turnout | | 17,188 | 55.71 | | |
Source: Elections BC

2013 British Columbia general election: Kootenay East
| Party | Candidate | Votes | % | ±% | Expenditures |
|---|---|---|---|---|---|
| Liberal | Bill Bennett | 10,252 | 62.99 | +11.78 | $126,532 |
| New Democratic | Norma Blissett | 6,023 | 37.01 | +1.39 | $74,121 |
| Total valid votes | | 16,275 | 100.00 | | |
| Total rejected ballots | | 138 | 0.84 | | |
| Turnout | | 16,413 | 53.41 | | |
Source: Elections BC

2009 British Columbia general election
| Party | Candidate | Votes | % | ±% | Expenditures |
|---|---|---|---|---|---|
| Liberal | Bill Bennett | 8,404 | 51.21% | +3.2 | $159,218 |
| New Democratic | Troy Sebastian | 5,844 | 35.62% | −8.1 | $92,272 |
| Conservative | Wilf Hanni | 1,612 | 9.82% | – | $24,562 |
| Green | Jen Tsuida | 549 | 3.35% | −4.92 | $850 |
| Total Valid Votes | | 16,409 | 100% | | |
| Total Rejected Ballots | | 53 | 0.32% | | |
| Turnout | | 16,462 | 55.87% | | |

2005 British Columbia general election East Kootenay
| Party | Candidate | Votes | % | ± | Expenditures |
|---|---|---|---|---|---|
| Liberal | Bill Bennett | 8,060 | 48.01% | | $98,363 |
| NDP | Erda Walsh | 7,339 | 43.72% | | $54,902 |
| Green | Luke Gurbin | 1,389 | 8.27% | – | $200 |
| Total Valid Votes | | 16,788 | 100% | | |
| Total Rejected Ballots | | 111 | 0.66% | | |
| Turnout | | 16,899 | 60.03% | | |

2001 British Columbia general election: East Kootenay
| Party | Candidate | Votes | % | ± | Expenditures |
|---|---|---|---|---|---|
| Liberal | Bill Bennett | 10,206 | 61.85% | | $41,778 |
| NDP | Erda Walsh | 3,638 | 22.05% | | $41,196 |
| Unity | Bruce Parke | 651 | 3.95% | | $100 |
| Green | Joni Krats | 1,287 | 7.80% | – | $509 |
| Marijuana | Fred Sima | 718 | 4.35% | | $844 |
| Total valid votes | | 16,500 | 100.00% | | |
| Total rejected ballots | | 59 | 0.36% | | |
| Turnout | | 16,559 | 68.76% | | |

1996 British Columbia general election: Kootenay
| Party | Candidate | Votes | % | ± | Expenditures |
|---|---|---|---|---|---|
| NDP | Erda Walsh | 6,398 | 38.59% | | $50,043 |
| Liberal | Ron Tarr | 5,887 | 35.50% | | $43,761 |
| Reform | Wilf Hanni | 3,718 | 22.42% | | $27,845 |
| Green | Casey Brennan | 363 | 2.19% | – | $100 |
| Independent | Marko Makar | 215 | 1.30% | | $2,707 |
| Total valid votes | | 16,581 | 100.00% | | |
| Total rejected ballots | | 62 | 0.37% | | |
| Turnout | | 16,643 | 68.15% | | |

1991 British Columbia general election: Kootenay
| Party | Candidate | Votes | % | ± | Expenditures |
|---|---|---|---|---|---|
| NDP | Anne Edwards | 7,352 | 46.49% | | $44,609 |
| Social Credit | Terry Segarty | 5,014 | 31.70% | – | $69,607 |
| Liberal | William (Bill) G. Hills | 3,450 | 21.81% | | $2,581 |
| Total valid votes | | 15,816 | 100.00% | | |
| Total rejected ballots | | 296 | 1.84% | | |
| Turnout | | 16,112 | 73.94% | | |

1986 British Columbia general election
| Party | Candidate | Votes | % | ± | Expenditures |
|---|---|---|---|---|---|
| New Democratic | Anne Edwards | 8,000 | 47.94% | | unknown |
| Social Credit | Terry Segarty | 7,649 | 45.85% | | unknown |
| Liberal | Paul R. Kershaw | 539 | 3.23% | | unknown |
| Progressive Conservative | James G. Smith | 499 | 2.99% | | unknown |
| Total valid votes | | 16,687 | 100.00% | | |
| Total rejected ballots | | 271 | | | |
| Turnout | | % | | | |

1983 British Columbia general election
| Party | Candidate | Votes | % | ± | Expenditures |
|---|---|---|---|---|---|
| Social Credit | Terry Segarty | 8,819 | 50.65% | | unknown |
| New Democratic | Harry Edwin Mathias | 8,245 | 47.36% | | unknown |
| Liberal | Kory Palmer | 347 | 1.99% | | unknown |
| Total valid votes | | 17,411 | 100.00% | | |
| Total rejected ballots | | 208 | | | |
| Turnout | | % | | | |

1979 British Columbia general election
| Party | Candidate | Votes | % | ± | Expenditures |
|---|---|---|---|---|---|
| Social Credit | Terry Segarty | 6,167 | 49.37% | | unknown |
| New Democratic | Douglas Wayne Wright | 5,350 | 42.83% | | unknown |
| Progressive Conservative | Roy Wilburn Paul | 975 | 7.80% | | unknown |
| Total valid votes | | 12,492 | 100.00% | | |
| Total rejected ballots | | 102 | | | |
| Turnout | | % | | | |

1975 British Columbia general election
| Party | Candidate | Votes | % | ± | Expenditures |
|---|---|---|---|---|---|
| Social Credit | George Wayne Haddad | 7,915 | 52.29% | | unknown |
| New Democratic | James Patterson | 7,223 | 47.71% | | unknown |
| Total valid votes | | 15,138 | 100.00% | | |
| Total rejected ballots | | 180 | | | |
| Turnout | | % | | | |

1972 British Columbia general election
| Party | Candidate | Votes | % | ± | Expenditures |
|---|---|---|---|---|---|
| New Democratic | Leo Nimsick | 6,065 | 44.20% | | unknown |
| Liberal | Harry Edwards Caldwell | 4,267 | 38.26% | | unknown |
| Conservative | David John Reeves | 4,169 | 30.38% | | unknown |
| Social Credit | Ronald Powell | 1,615 | 11.77% | – | unknown |
| Total valid votes | | 13,721 | 100.00% | | |
| Total rejected ballots | | 180 | | | |
| Turnout | | % | | | |

1969 British Columbia general election
| Party | Candidate | Votes | % | ± | Expenditures |
|---|---|---|---|---|---|
| New Democratic | Leo Nimsick | 4,282 | 38.39% | | unknown |
| Social Credit | Harry J. Broadhurst | 4,267 | 38.26% | | unknown |
| Liberal | Henry Nelson | 2,604 | 23.55% | | unknown |
| Total valid votes | | 11,153 | 100.00% | | |
| Total rejected ballots | | 173 | | | |
| Turnout | | % | | | |

1966 British Columbia general election
| Party | Candidate | Votes | % | ± | Expenditures |
|---|---|---|---|---|---|
| New Democratic | Leo Nimsick | 3,605 | 40.98% | | unknown |
| Social Credit | Robert Owen Jones | 3,070 | 34.89% | | unknown |
| Liberal | Harry McKay | 2,123 | 24.13% | | unknown |
| Total valid votes | | 8,798 | 100.00% | | |
| Total rejected ballots | | 54 | | | |
| Turnout | | % | | | |

== See also ==
- List of electoral districts in the Kootenays
- List of British Columbia provincial electoral districts
- Canadian provincial electoral districts
