= Jaffray, British Columbia =

- Village
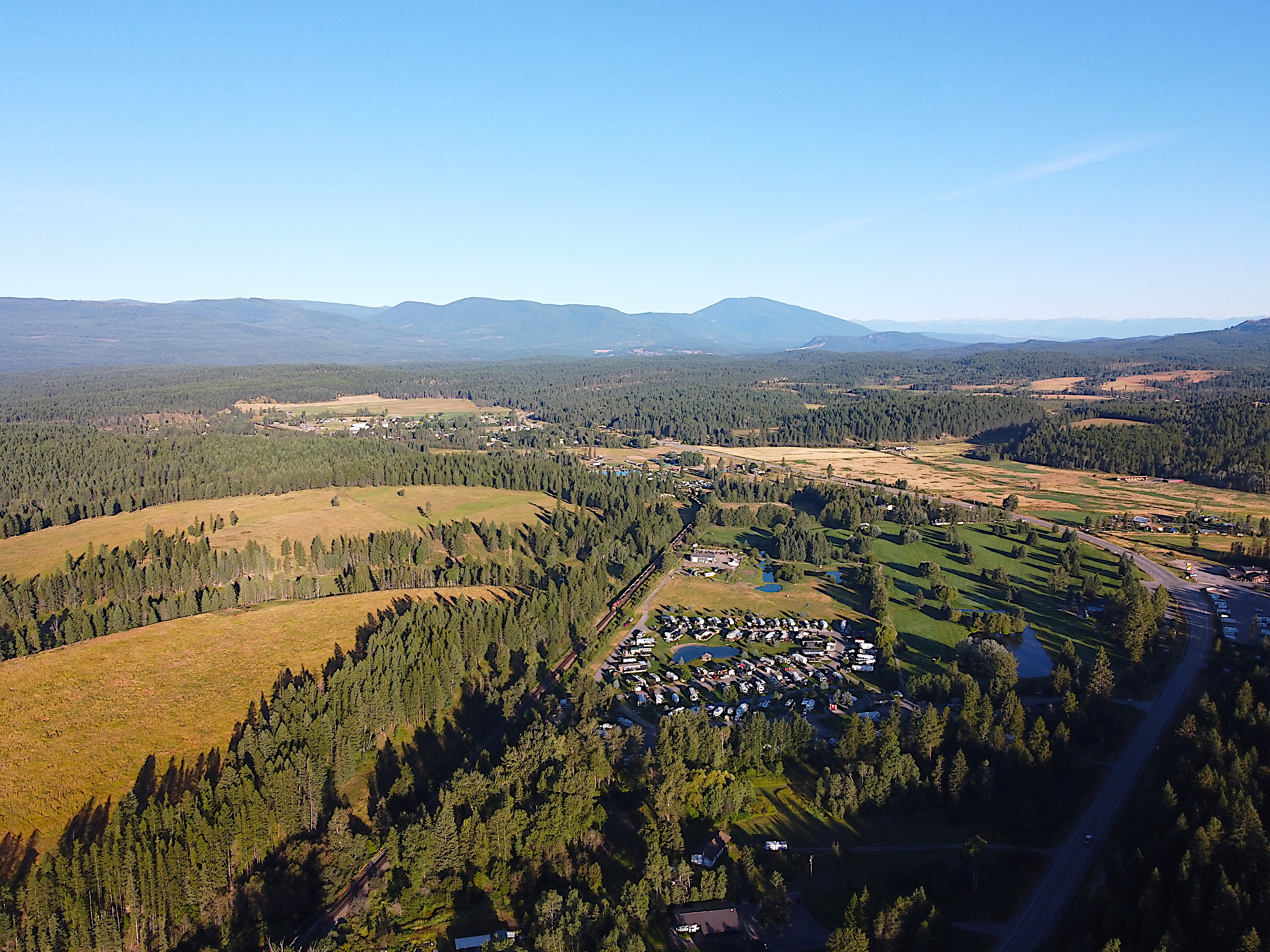

- Location of Jaffray in British Columbia
- Coordinates: 49°22′59″N 115°18′03″W
- Country: Canada
- Province: British Columbia
- Region: East Kootenay
- Regional District: East Kootenay
- Settled: 1900

Government
  - MP: Rob Morrison
  - MLA: Tom Shypitka

Area
  - Total: 6.89 km^{2} (2.66 sq mi)
- Elevation: 823 m (2,700 ft)

Population (2021)
  - Total: 510
  - Density: 74/km^{2} (190/sq mi)
- Time zone: UTC-7 (Mountain Standard (MST))
  - Summer (DST): UTC-6 (Mountain Daylight (MDT))
- Postal Code: V0B 1T0
- Area codes: 250, 778, 236, & 672
- NTS Map: 082G06
- Highways: Highway 3 Highway 93

Jaffray is an unincorporated community on the west side of Little Sand Creek in the East Kootenay region of southeastern British Columbia. On BC Highway 3/93, the locality is by road about 80 kilometres (50 mi) southwest of Sparwood and 47 kilometres (29 mi) southeast of Cranbrook.

== History ==
Jaffray was formerly a siding, depot and steam train water stop. In the early 1900s, Robert Jaffray and several of his brothers worked at the local sawmills, eventually leaving and homesteading in Lacombe, Alberta. Even though some local people believed that Jaffray may have been named after the brothers, according to folklore, Jaffray had already been named by the time they came to the area. Frank Desrosier may have been the first resident to purchase land in the Jaffray town-site, purchasing District Lot 3055. In September 1900, Robert Elmsby received a crown grant on D.L. 3543, obtaining 81 hectares (200 acres) for two hundred dollars, including most of what is now Jaffray proper.

Since the first residents settled, Jaffray has had four hotels, including the Jaffray Hotel, the Henderson's Hotel, Desrosier's Hotel and the Pearson Hotel. Historical general stores included Anthony Modigh's General Store, Economy Corner Store, and the Jaffray General Store.

== Fire protection ==
In September 1995, the Regional District of East Kootenay, with the direction of founding Fire Chief John Betenia, and community approval of an RDEK bylaw, opened the Jaffray Volunteer Fire Department with 31 volunteer firefighter trainees.

The department has expanded considerably since inception and now includes a rescue team with First Responder Level III status.

== Geography ==
Jaffray is located near the picturesque Steeples, which include Fisher Peak, and the Lizard Mountain ranges, not far from Lake Koocanusa. The village is found on Highway 3 and 93, west of the Elko Highway 93 junction; just north of the Canadian/United States border at Rooseville, BC. This portion of the Rocky Mountain Trench is relatively flat, with open woodland and grasslands. The area is very popular for its great recreational opportunities.

== Climate ==
Cranbrook Climatological Data
Temperature
Month	Jan	Feb	Mar	Apr	May	Jun	Jul	Aug	Sep	Oct	Nov	Dec	Total
Record high °C (°F)	10	14	19	28	33	35	36	36	34	29	18	12	
Average high °C (°F)	-2	-2	8	14	18	22	26	26	20	12	2	-3	2.5
Mean °C (°F)	-6	-3	2	7	12	15	18	18	13	6	-1	-7	8.5
Average low °C (°F)	-10	-8	-3	1	5	8	10	10	5	0	-5	-10	-0.2
Record low °C (°F)	-33	-32	-24	-10	-4	-1	3	-1	-6	-15	-30	-35	
Precipitation and Sunshine Hours
Month	Jan	Feb	Mar	Apr	May	Jun	Jul	Aug	Sep	Oct	Nov	Dec	Total
Total mm (in)	33	24	20	27	44	53	36	29	29	22	40	46	403
Rainfall mm (in)	4	5	12	23	43	53	36	29	29	20	15	6	275
Snowfall cm (in)	30	19	8	4	1	0	0	0	0	2	24	40	128
Data recorded at Canadian Rockies International Airport by Environment Canada. Data spans 1971 to 2000.

== Education ==
Census population: Jaffray
Year	Pop.	±%
1951	157	—
1956	158	+0.6%
1961	282	+78.5%
1966	269	−4.6%
1971	193	−28.3%
1976	93	−51.8%
1981		—
1986	376	—
1991	440	+17.0%
1996		—
2001		—
2006	453	—
2011	494	+9.1%
2016*	564	+14.2%
2021	510	−9.6%
Source: Statistics Canada * Revised figure

Part of School District 5 Southeast Kootenay, Jaffray Elementary Junior Secondary School has about 225 students from Kindergarten to Grade 10.

== Notable people ==
- Dean Brody (1975– ), country recording artist, residence as a youth.

== Radio stations ==
(broadcast from Jaffray)

- 101.3 FM - CBC Radio One, repeater located in Jaffray.

(available in Jaffray (broadcast from Cranbrook))

- 107.5 FM - CFSM-FM, 107.5 2Day FM
- 104.7 FM - CHBZ-FM, B-104
- 102.9 FM - CHDR-FM, The Drive FM
