= Fernie Memorial Arena =

Indoor arena in British Columbia, Canada

- Interactive map of Fernie Memorial Arena
- Location: 1092 Highway 3 Fernie, British Columbia; V0B 1M0
- Coordinates: 49.5097°N 115.0620°W
- Capacity: 1,000 (hockey arena)

Construction
- Groundbreaking: September 22, 1951
- Opened: November 15, 1952
- Cost: CA$100,000 (1952)

Tenants
- Fernie Ghostriders (RMJHL, AWHL, NAHL, KIJHL, BCHC) (1991–1992, 1993–2017, 2018–present)

Fernie Memorial Arena is a multi-sports complex located in Fernie, British Columbia. The facility contains an indoor ice hockey arena and a curling rink. The hockey arena is home to the Fernie Ghostriders of the British Columbia Hockey Conference (BCHC). The complex was the site of an ammonia leak in 2017 that killed three workers. The hockey arena can hold up to 1,000 spectators.

== History ==
=== Construction ===
Construction began on the Fernie Memorial Arena on September 22, 1951. The cost of the arena was initially estimated to be CA$70,000, with CA$61,000 having been raised by the beginning of construction, through local fundraisers, donations and payroll deduction plans at near-by mines. The arena opened on November 15, 1952, with a final cost of CA$100,000, aided by a CA$25,000 donation by a city bylaw. The City of Fernie became the operator of the arena. In the arena's first season, it was only used for three weeks due to a mild winter. In the spring of 1953, the Fernie Arena Citizens' Finance Committee began canvasing door-to-door to fundraise for an artificial ice making system. The arena's first artificial ice equipment was installed on April 3, 1951, for a cost of CA$64,000. The original ice equipment was later replaced in the 1980s, with the curling chiller being installed in 1986.

The City of Fernie received a Wood WORKS! BC award in 2021 for repairs on the arena's wooden roof trusses.

=== Fernie Raiders ===
The Kootenay International Junior Hockey League added the Fernie Raiders before the 1973–74 season, the Raiders played in the KIJHL until they moved to Elk Valley in 1980.

=== Fernie Ghostriders ===
Fernie was awarded a Junior A team in the newly renamed Rocky Mountain Junior Hockey League in May 1991, along with four other cities. The Fernie Ghostriders played 7 seasons in the RMJHL (not participating in 1992–92) before the league folded after the 1998–99 season. The Ghostriders joined the American West Hockey League for the 1999–2000 season until 2003, when the league organized a merger with the North American Hockey League ahead of the 2003–04 season. The Ghostriders played only one season in the NAHL before moving to the Kootenay International Junior Hockey League in 2004–05. In 2026, the Ghostriders were one of 14 KIJHL teams to join the British Columbia Hockey Conference for the 2026–27 season.

== 2017 ammonia incident ==
2017 Fernie ammonia leak incident
- Date: October 17, 2017
- Time: 3:53 a.m. to 1:50 p.m. (MDT)
- Venue: Fernie Memorial Arena
- Location: Fernie, British Columbia, Canada
- Type: Ammonia leak
- Cause: Leak in curling rink refrigeration system
- Deaths: 3

=== Background ===
The arena's ice hockey rink and curling rink were refrigerated by a brine chiller. A brine chiller uses a cylinder containing ammonia to refrigerate the rink. Inside the cylinder, many small tubes move warm and cold brine through the cylinder. The warm and cold brine should not mix. In late 2010 and early 2011, the maintenance contractor of the City of Fernie recommended that the chiller, installed in 1986, be replaced as it had surpassed its 20 to 25 year life expectancy. Following this recommendation, the municipal government scheduled a replacement for the chiller to be installed in 2013. This was later rescheduled to 2014 before disappearing from city plans in 2014. In spring of 2017, a small leak had been detected inside the ammonia chiller, likely due to corrosion, this leak was not repaired during the summer of 2017 and it was decided that the chiller would still be put into operation for the 2017 fall season.

=== Incident ===
In the morning of October 16, 2017, the arena's curling brine chiller was turned on for the upcoming season. On October 17, 2017, at 3:53 a.m., the automatic ammonia gas detector's alarm was triggered. The alarm system notified an alarm monitoring company and the fire department that there had been an ammonia leak. Shortly after the alarm began sounding, two City of Fernie workers, a refrigeration operator and the director of leisure services, arrived at the arena along with members of the fire department. Two fire fighters and the refrigeration operator entered the compressor room, where the chiller was located, wearing personal breathing apparatuses. Inside the compressor room, the refrigeration system was running, with the alarm sounding and the brine expansion tanks shaking and releasing brine. The firefighters' handheld ammonia detectors registered readings as high as 300 parts-per-million. The refrigeration operator closed some valves in the brine system and the ammonia system, and the firefighters ventilated the arena. The brine expansion tank stopped shaking and ammonia levels were measured at 50 parts-per-million. At approximately 4:30 a.m., the refrigeration operator shut down the system and isolated the leaking chiller. At 4:48 a.m., the director of leisure services made a phone call to the city's maintenance contractor, informing the contractor that the system had been shut down and the chiller had been isolated. On this phone call, the maintenance contractor requested to send a mechanic later in the day to keep the hockey arena side of the complex operating. Between 4:30 a.m. and 5:00 a.m., the firefighters were informed that they were no longer needed and vacated the premises. A second phone call took place between the director of leisure services and the city's maintenance contractor at 5:18 a.m. On this second phone call, they discuss getting the hockey arena operational and the need for an oil change in the compressor, as the oil had been contaminated with brine that had leaked from the brine expansion tank. At 7:33 a.m., the refrigeration operator advised the alarm monitoring company that emergency first responders should not be called for ammonia alarms until 4:00 p.m., as the system was being worked on. At 8:00 a.m., the director informed a municipal employee that the curling season was to be cancelled, but that they aimed to have the hockey arena operating later in the day. At around 9:00 a.m., the refrigerator mechanic, refrigeration operator and director of leisure services made plans to enter the compressor room and change the compressor oil, the team also planned to put the ammonia alarm on silent mode for the repairs. Shortly after 9:00 a.m., the three entered the compressor room, they were not wearing personal protective equipment and did not carry personal ammonia detectors. As the system was shut down, the ammonia leak in the chiller continued and was causing a pressure buildup in the curling brine system. Between 9:15 a.m. and 9:38 a.m., a pipe coupling in the compressor room separated and released an estimated 9 lbs of ammonia into the room. The total amount of ammonia in the room may have reached up to 20,000 parts-per-million, well beyond survivability. Starting at around 9:40 a.m., residents in the surrounding area began reporting the smell of ammonia. At 12:50 p.m., an electrician discovered a worker in the compressor room, the electrician called 911 and performed CPR until the fire department arrived on scene. At 1:50 p.m., emergency crews opened the emergency discharge valve and used the emergency stop of the ammonia system on the exterior of the arena. Technical Safety BC estimated that this valve released 55 lbs of ammonia immediately into the atmosphere and additional 632 lbs gradually over the subsequent days.

=== Aftermath ===
The Fernie Fire Department originally tried to enter the compressor room in the afternoon of October 17, but withdrew from the arena for safety reasons. Fire crews were able to enter the building at around 11 p.m. on October 18 to recover the bodies of the deceased. During the afternoon of October 17, the City of Fernie declared a local state of emergency and 55 homes in the area were evacuated and 95 residents were put up in a local hotel. On October 20, a pressure vacuum was brought from Alberta to remove ammonia from the arena. On October 22, the evacuation order was ended and 95 residents were allowed to return to their homes after the fire department determined there was no further threat of ammonia to the community. The state of emergency was rescinded on October 24. Later in October 2017, an arena in North Vancouver closed to replace its refrigeration system. The Fernie Ghostriders played the remainder of their home games in the 2017–18 KIJHL season at the Elk Valley Leisure Centre in Sparwood. A memorial was held for the three victims on November 12, 2017, at Fernie Secondary School.

=== Investigation ===
The incident was investigated by the City of Fernie, the RCMP, WorkSafe BC and Technical Safety BC. During the investigations, a legal battle flared up between the City of Fernie and the RCMP. The municipal government alleged that the RCMP obtained two log books related to the refrigeration system of the arena without a search warrant. The city filed an application with provincial court to inspect and copy the books to conduct their own investigation. This application was denied by a provincial court judge who noted that the city could potentially be a "suspect" in a hypothetical criminal probe by the RCMP.

Technical Safety BC released their report on July 25, 2018. TSBC reported that the continued use of the chiller beyond its life expectancy was "pivotal" in the incident. WorkSafeBC released their report on August 29, 2018, where they found that the City of Fernie and the refrigeration company, CIMCO Refrigeration, violated numerous labour laws in the lead up and during the incident.

=== Recovery ===
In November 2017, an outdoor rink was built by the City of Fernie and volunteers as the arena was closed due to the investigations into the incident. The arena was closed for three months after the incident. On January 4, 2018, Mayor Giuliano said the municipal government would like for the arena to be reopened for normal operations. The arena was handed back to the city on January 30, 2018, but was not opened to the public until the next fall. In March 2018, the municipal government announced plans for a new ice plant in the arena. The new plant was built by Startec, with funding from the Calgary Flames Foundation and the National Hockey League. The new system was built outside the complex and uses an alternative to ammonia to cool the rink.
