= FSS =

FSS may refer to:

== Education ==
- Faculty of Social Sciences, Charles University in Prague in the Czech Republic
- Fernie Secondary School, in British Columbia, Canada
- Friends Select School, in Philadelphia, Pennsylvania, United States
- Frontenac Secondary School, in Kingston, Ontario, Canada

== Government ==
- Federal Security Service, a principal security agency of Russia
- Federal statistical system, a decentralized network of federal agencies in the United States
- Federal Supply Service, part of the General Services Administration of the United States
- Financial Supervisory Service, South Korean supervisory agency on financial regulation
- Food Standards Scotland, a non-ministerial government department of the government of Scotland
- Forensic and Scientific Services, an agency of the state government of Queensland, Australia
- Forensic Science Service, a defunct British crown corporation
- Foreign Service specialist, Department of State

== Military ==
- Fast Sealift Ship of the United States Navy
- Fire Support Specialist, an artillery observer in the United States Army
- RAF Kinloss, a former Royal Air Force station in Scotland

== Sport ==
- Florida State Seminoles, the sports teams of Florida State University
- Football Association of Serbia
- FS Seoul, a South Korean futsal club

== Technology ==
- Fish School Search
- Fixed-satellite service
- Fixed Service Structure, a launch tower leased by SpaceX at Kennedy Space Center, Florida, United States
- Flats Sequencing System, a mail sorting system used by the United States Postal Service
- Flight service station
- Flying-spot scanner
- Food Service Solutions, an American software company
- Frequency selective surface

== Other uses ==
- FSS (brand), a Colombian sports apparel manufacturer
- Federal Signal Corporation, an American emergency services equipment manufacturer
- Fellow of the Royal Statistical Society
- Finland-Swedish Sign Language
- The Five Star Stories, a manga series by Mamoru Nagano
- Flinders Street railway station in Melbourne, Australia
- Foundation Stock Service Program, a dog breed registry
- Fox Sports South, an American regional sports network by Fox Sports Networks
- Functional somatic syndrome, a disorder
- Freeman–Sheldon syndrome
- FSS Code, an international maritime fire code
- Standard Written Form (Cornish: Furv Skrifys Savonek), a Cornish orthographic standard
- Swiss Socialist Federation (French: Fédération socialiste suisse), a defunct political party in Switzerland

== See also ==
- FS (disambiguation)
