= Erda Walsh =

Canadian politician (born 1952)

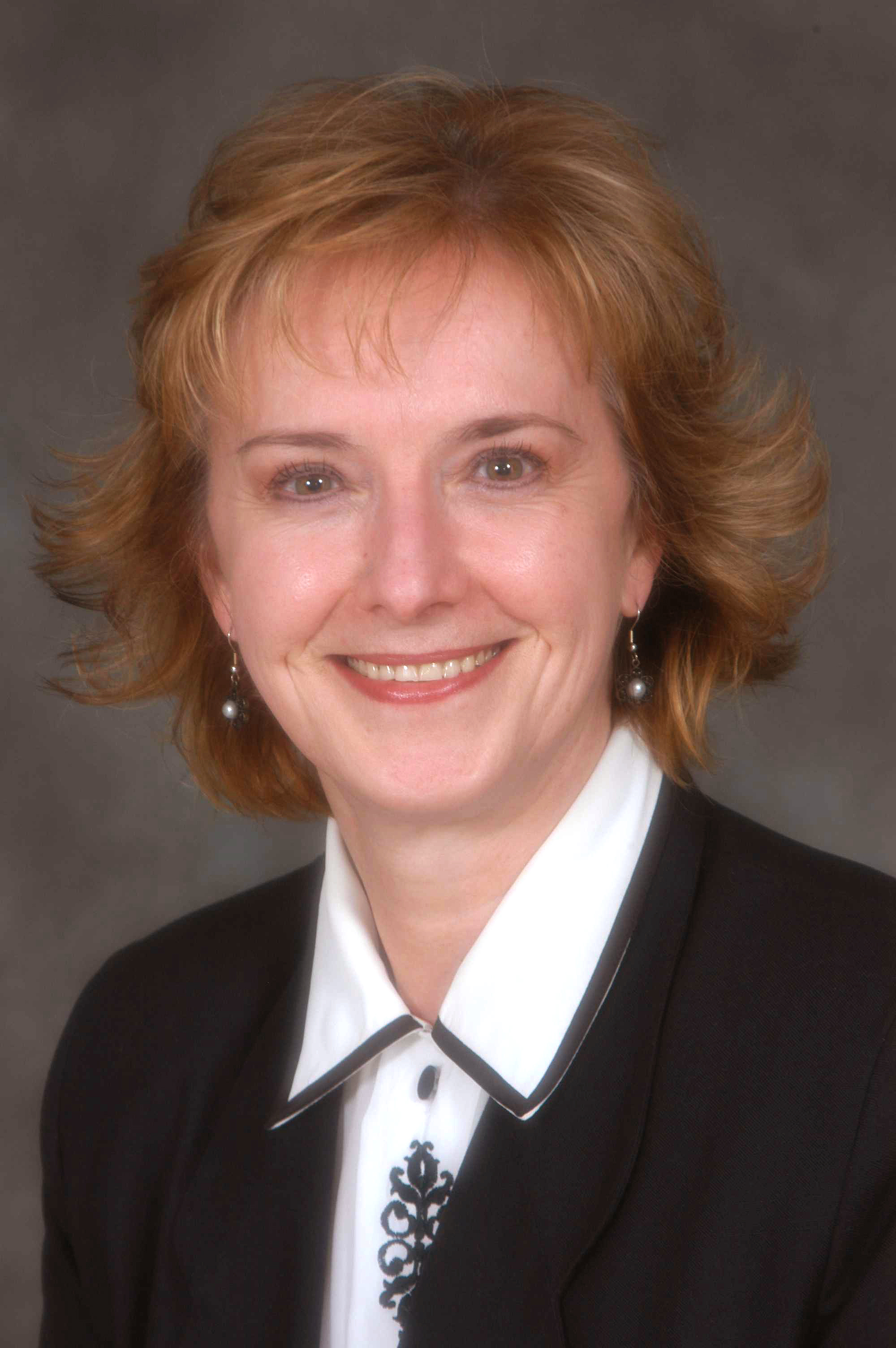

MLA for Kootenay
- In office 1996–2001
- Preceded by: Anne Edwards
- Succeeded by: Bill Bennett

Personal details
- Born: 1952 (age 73–74) Hildesheim, Germany
- Party: NDP

Erda Sieglinde Walsh is a former Canadian politician. She served as the member of the Legislative Assembly of British Columbia (MLA) for the riding of Kootenay from 1996 to 2001, as a member of the British Columbia New Democratic Party. She was an unsuccessful candidate in both the 2001 and 2005 provincial elections.

Prior to entering politics, Walsh worked at the Cranbrook Regional Hospital, owned a small business and worked as a paramedic for the B.C. Ambulance Service. She also served on the city council for Cranbrook.
