= Bill Bennett (Liberal MLA) =

Canadian politician (born 1950)

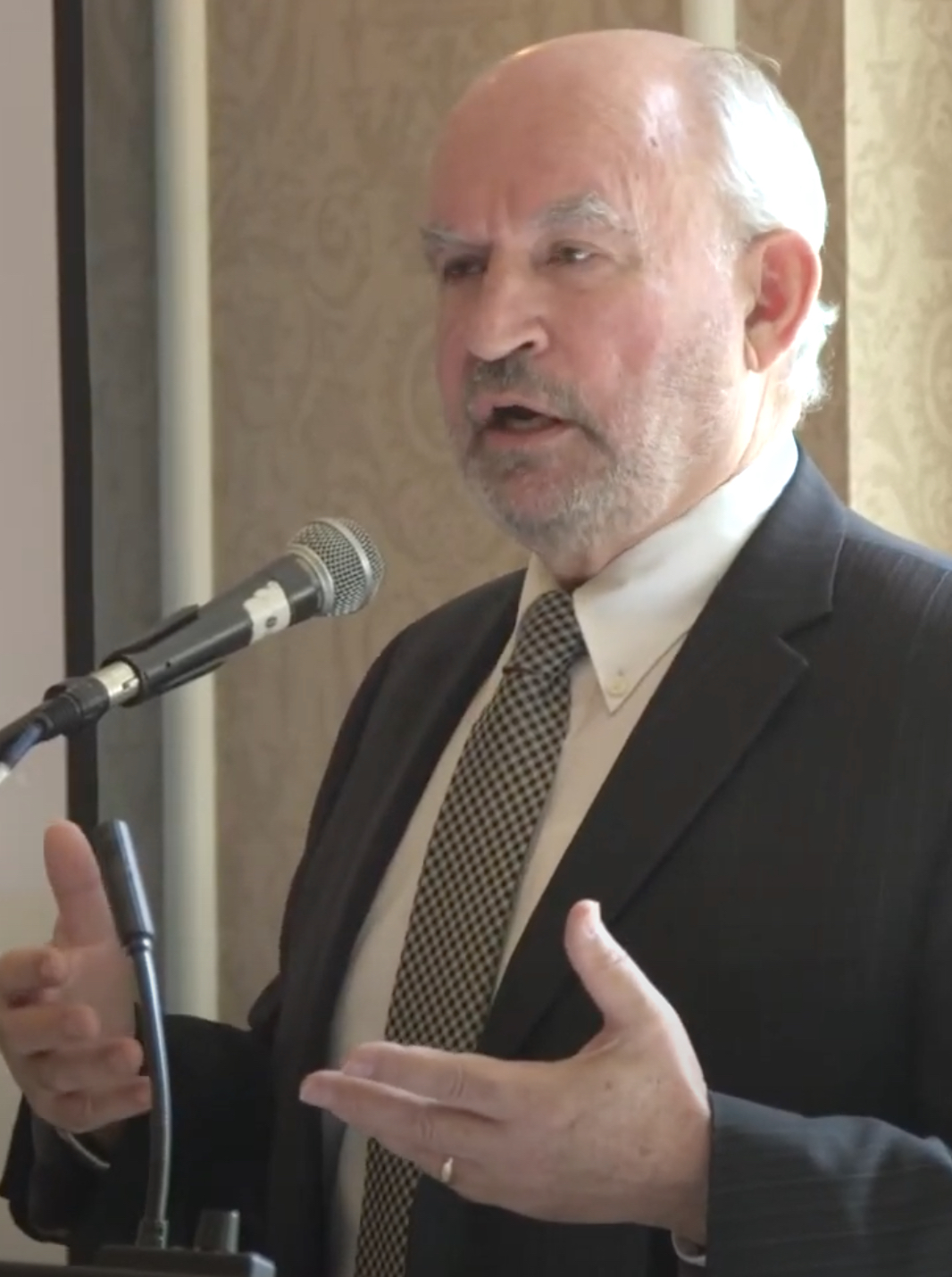

Member of the British Columbia Legislative Assembly for Kootenay East East Kootenay (2001-2009)
- In office May 16, 2001 – May 9, 2017
- Preceded by: Erda Walsh
- Succeeded by: Tom Shypitka

Minister of State for Mining of British Columbia
- In office June 16, 2005 – February 7, 2007
- Premier: Gordon Campbell
- Preceded by: Pat Bell
- Succeeded by: Kevin Krueger

Minister of Tourism, Culture and the Arts of British Columbia
- In office June 23, 2008 – June 10, 2009
- Premier: Gordon Campbell
- Preceded by: Stan Hagen
- Succeeded by: Kevin Krueger

Minister of Community and Rural Development of British Columbia
- In office June 10, 2009 – June 11, 2010
- Premier: Gordon Campbell
- Preceded by: Kevin Krueger (Community Development)
- Succeeded by: Ben Stewart

Minister of Energy, Mines and Petroleum Resources of British Columbia
- In office June 11, 2010 – October 25, 2010
- Premier: Gordon Campbell
- Preceded by: Blair Lekstrom
- Succeeded by: Bill Bennett

Minister of Energy of British Columbia
- In office October 25, 2010 – November 17, 2010
- Premier: Gordon Campbell
- Preceded by: Bill Bennett
- Succeeded by: Steve Thomson

Minister of Community, Sport and Cultural Development of British Columbia
- In office September 5, 2012 – June 10, 2013
- Premier: Christy Clark
- Preceded by: Ida Chong
- Succeeded by: Coralee Oakes

Minister Responsible for Core Review of British Columbia
- In office June 10, 2013 – June 12, 2017
- Premier: Christy Clark
- Preceded by: Position established
- Succeeded by: Position abolished

Minister of Energy and Mines of British Columbia
- In office June 10, 2013 – June 12, 2017
- Premier: Christy Clark
- Preceded by: Rich Coleman
- Succeeded by: Rich Coleman

Personal details
- Born: 1950
- Party: BC Liberals
- Other political affiliations: Independent (2010-2011)
- Spouse: Beth Bennett (m. 1974)
- Education: University of Guelph (B.A.); Queen's University (LL.B.)
- Profession: lawyer

William Bennett (born 1950) is a former Canadian politician. From 2001 until 2017, Bennett represented the riding of Kootenay East in the Legislative Assembly of British Columbia. As part of the BC Liberal Party caucus, he served in several cabinet posts under Premiers Gordon Campbell and Christy Clark.

== Early life and career ==
Bennett grew up in Campbellford, Ontario, where his parents owned a furniture store. After leaving school at grade 9, he found work in his late teens at a fly-in fishing lodge near the Northern Ontario town of Red Lake. He later returned to school, graduating from the University of Guelph in 1976 with an honours degree in English, and went on to own and operate fly-in fishing and hunting lodges in the Northwest Territories and Manitoba.

He then returned to Campbellford with his family and attended law school at Queen's University, earning a law degree in 1992. He subsequently moved to Cranbrook, British Columbia, and practiced law there beginning in 1994. He had also served as president of the Cranbrook Chamber of Commerce and the Kootenay Bar Association.

He married his wife Beth in 1974; they have two sons together.

== Politics ==
Bennett ran for the BC Liberals in the 2001 provincial election, defeating the incumbent New Democratic candidate Erda Walsh to become member of the Legislative Assembly (MLA) for East Kootenay. After being re-elected at the 2005 provincial election, he was appointed to cabinet by Premier Gordon Campbell as Minister of State for Mining, but resigned from the post in February 2007 after it was revealed that he had sent a profanity-laden email to a constituent. He then returned to cabinet as Minister of Tourism, Culture and the Arts in June 2008.

In the 2009 provincial election, Bennett was re-elected MLA in the renamed riding of Kootenay East. He was appointed Minister of Community and Rural Development that June, then became Minister of Energy, Mines and Petroleum Resources in June 2010. Amidst the controversial introduction of the Harmonized Sales Tax, Bennett openly criticized Campbell's leadership in an October 2010 interview with the Vancouver Sun. Campbell initially stated that he had no plans to remove Bennett from cabinet; however, Bennett was dismissed from his post on November 17, and removed from the Liberal party caucus two days later.

He sat in the legislature as an independent member following his ouster from caucus, and supported George Abbott in the subsequent Liberal leadership election to replace the outgoing Campbell. He was re-instated into the Liberal caucus in April 2011 after Christy Clark took over as premier and Liberal leader, and was appointed Minister of Community, Sport and Cultural Development by Clark in September 2012.

Following his re-election as Kootenay East MLA in 2013, he was appointed as Minister of Energy and Mines and Minister Responsible for Core Review that June. He announced in June 2016 that he would not run in the following year's provincial election. After finishing his term as MLA in 2017, he received appointments to the boards of directors of Eagle Plains Resources and Copper Creek Gold.

Besides his cabinet posts, he had also served as chair of the Select Standing Committee on Finance and Government Services, and the Special Committee on Cosmetic Pesticides while in legislature.

== Electoral record ==
2013 British Columbia general election: Kootenay East
Party	Candidate	Votes	%	±%	Expenditures
Liberal	Bill Bennett	10,252	62.99	+11.78	$126,532
New Democratic	Norma Blissett	6,023	37.01	+1.39	$74,121
Total valid votes		16,275	100.00		
Total rejected ballots		138	0.84		
Turnout		16,413	53.41		
Source: Elections BC

2009 British Columbia general election: Kootenay East
Party	Candidate	Votes	%	±%	Expenditures
Liberal	Bill Bennett	8,404	51.21%	+3.2	$159,218
New Democratic	Troy Sebastian	5,844	35.62%	−8.1	$92,272
Conservative	Wilf Hanni	1,612	9.82%	–	$24,562
Green	Jen Tsuida	549	3.35%	−4.92	$850
Total Valid Votes		16,409	100%		
Total Rejected Ballots		53	0.32%		
Turnout		16,462	55.87%		

2005 British Columbia general election: East Kootenay
Party	Candidate	Votes	%	±	Expenditures
Liberal	Bill Bennett	8,060	48.01%		$98,363
NDP	Erda Walsh	7,339	43.72%		$54,902
Green	Luke Gurbin	1,389	8.27%	–	$200
Total Valid Votes		16,788	100%		
Total Rejected Ballots		111	0.66%		
Turnout		16,899	60.03%		

2001 British Columbia general election: East Kootenay
Party	Candidate	Votes	%	±	Expenditures
Liberal	Bill Bennett	10,206	61.85%		$41,778
NDP	Erda Walsh	3,638	22.05%		$41,196
Unity	Bruce Parke	651	3.95%		$100
Green	Joni Krats	1,287	7.80%	–	$509
Marijuana	Fred Sima	718	4.35%		$844
Total valid votes		16,500	100.00%		
Total rejected ballots		59	0.36%		
Turnout		16,559	68.76%		
