= Elkford =

Coal mining community in British Columbia

- District municipality
- District of Elkford
- Motto: Wild at Heart
- Location in British Columbia Location in the RD of East Kootenay
- Coordinates: 50°01′17″N 114°54′57″W
- Country: Canada
- Province: British Columbia
- Regional district: East Kootenay
- Incorporated: 1971

Government
  - Governing body: Elkford Council

Area
  - Total: 101.59 km^{2} (39.22 sq mi)
- Elevation: 1,300 m (4,300 ft)

Population (2016)
  - Total: 2,499
- Time zone: UTC-6 (CST)
- Postal code span: V0B 1H0
- Area code: 250 / 778 / 236: 250-865 778-521
- Highways: Highway 43
- Website: www.elkford.ca

Elkford is a district municipality in the southeast region of the Canadian province of British Columbia in the Rocky Mountain range. It is 32 km (20 mi) north of the junction at Sparwood, on provincial Highway 43. Outdoor recreational activities take place in Elkford throughout the year. Elkford hosts an annual festival called Wildcat Days during the last weekend of June.

The town and area have many kilometres of horse riding, hiking, snowmobiling and cross country ski trails, and a ski hill, Wapiti, run by Elkford resident volunteers. The Elkford Aquatic Centre has a competition-size pool, hot tub and sauna.

There are two public schools Rocky Mountain Elementary School and Elkford Secondary School with a combined student population of 400 in January 2006.

There are five open-pit coal mines within an hour's drive of Elkford: Fording River Operations (FRO), Greenhills Operations (GHO), Line Creek Operations (LCO), Elkview Operations (EVO) and Coal Mountain Operations (CMO). All mines belong to Elk Valley Resources. Elkford was created due to mining activity, in the early 1970s. Many Elkford residents work for the mines or as contractors; other residents work in service industries directly related to the mines. The Fording River Operations (FRO) mine is located on the Continental Divide of the Americas, known as the Great Divide.

A coal seam close to Aldridge Creek, north of Elkford, has been burning for decades and is known to residents of the area as "The Burning Coal Seam." The fire started in 1936 when a forest fire ignited an old prospect opening south of Aldridge Creek. In 1975 and 1976, Fording Coal Ltd. removed coal from the seam in advance of the fire in an attempt to extinguish it - this did not work. A study monitoring the fire for 3 years, published in 1985, determined that the fire front was at that time advancing about 13.5m/year and that the zone of combustion, carbonization, and gasification extended to a depth of 20m below the ground surface, among other observations. The seam was assessed in 1988 using reflected light microscopy to determine the extent of transformation of the coal into coke. As of August 2016, locals and campers in the area reported the seam was still burning.

== Climate ==
Fording River weather station, near Elkford, has a subarctic climate (Köppen Dfc).

Climate data for Fording River Cominco, BC (1981–2010): 1585 m
Month	Jan	Feb	Mar	Apr	May	Jun	Jul	Aug	Sep	Oct	Nov	Dec	Year
Record high °C (°F)	10.6 (51.1)	12.0 (53.6)	16.5 (61.7)	24.4 (75.9)	28.0 (82.4)	35.0 (95.0)	37.5 (99.5)	36.7 (98.1)	32.5 (90.5)	25.5 (77.9)	13.3 (55.9)	10.0 (50.0)	37.5 (99.5)
Mean daily maximum °C (°F)	−5.4 (22.3)	−2.7 (27.1)	1.6 (34.9)	6.3 (43.3)	11.5 (52.7)	16.0 (60.8)	20.0 (68.0)	20.0 (68.0)	14.6 (58.3)	7.2 (45.0)	−2.5 (27.5)	−7.2 (19.0)	6.6 (43.9)
Daily mean °C (°F)	−9.9 (14.2)	−8.2 (17.2)	−3.5 (25.7)	1.1 (34.0)	5.5 (41.9)	9.7 (49.5)	12.6 (54.7)	12.1 (53.8)	7.5 (45.5)	1.8 (35.2)	−6.2 (20.8)	−11.3 (11.7)	0.9 (33.7)
Mean daily minimum °C (°F)	−14.2 (6.4)	−13.6 (7.5)	−8.6 (16.5)	−4.1 (24.6)	−0.5 (31.1)	3.3 (37.9)	5.1 (41.2)	4.1 (39.4)	0.4 (32.7)	−3.7 (25.3)	−9.9 (14.2)	−15.3 (4.5)	−4.7 (23.4)
Record low °C (°F)	−41.0 (−41.8)	−39.0 (−38.2)	−33.0 (−27.4)	−26.1 (−15.0)	−15.0 (5.0)	−6.1 (21.0)	−3.0 (26.6)	−6.0 (21.2)	−12.2 (10.0)	−25.6 (−14.1)	−36.5 (−33.7)	−49.0 (−56.2)	−49.0 (−56.2)
Average precipitation mm (inches)	45.5 (1.79)	33.9 (1.33)	44.8 (1.76)	43.8 (1.72)	59.1 (2.33)	85.7 (3.37)	58.1 (2.29)	47.1 (1.85)	48.5 (1.91)	40.5 (1.59)	60.9 (2.40)	49.2 (1.94)	617.1 (24.28)
Average snowfall cm (inches)	41.7 (16.4)	30.8 (12.1)	37.6 (14.8)	29.4 (11.6)	19.1 (7.5)	3.7 (1.5)	0.1 (0.0)	0.6 (0.2)	7.9 (3.1)	17.9 (7.0)	43.8 (17.2)	44.7 (17.6)	277.3 (109)
Source: Environment Canada

== Demographics ==
In the 2021 Canadian census conducted by Statistics Canada, Elkford had a population of 2,749 living in 1,159 of its 1,602 total private dwellings, a change of 10% from its 2016 population of 2,499. With a land area of 108.12 km^{2} (41.75 sq mi), it had a population density of 25.4/km^{2} (65.9/sq mi) in 2021.

=== Religion ===
According to the 2021 census, religious groups in Elkford included:

- Irreligion (1,530 persons or 55.7%)
- Christianity (1,195 persons or 43.5%)
- Buddhism (10 persons or 0.4%)
- Other (10 persons or 0.4%)

== Local media ==
=== Radio stations ===
- 99.1 FM - CJDR, Classic Rock
- 92.7 FM - CFBZ, Country
- 97.7 FM - CBTN, CBC Radio
- 106.9 FM - CJAY, Rock
- 90.1 FM - ..., Hip-hop/Hits
- 93.5 FM rock
- 92.9 FM rock
- 107.9 FM summit 107

=== Cable television stations ===
- Channel 10: Shaw TV
- Channel 5: CFCN, CTV
- Channel 13: CBUT, CBC

== In popular culture ==
Elkford is the setting of Braceface, an animated children's television series that aired in the early 2000s.

== See also ==
- Elk
- Elk River
- Elk Valley
- Ktunaxa
