= Sparwood Secondary School =

Location
- 101 Pine Spur; Sparwood, British Columbia, V0B 2G0; Canada; 49.73578°N 114.89095°W

Information
- Other name: SSS
- Type: Public high school
- Established: 2008
- School district: School District 5 Southeast Kootenay
- Principal: Erin Hay
- Staff: 30
- Grades: 7–12
- Enrollment: 308 (2025/2026)
- Colour: Maroon
- Mascot: Spartan
- Team name: Spartans
- Website: https://www.sd5.bc.ca/sss
- Last updated: October 3, 2026

Sparwood Secondary School (SSS) is a public high school in Sparwood, British Columbia, Canada. It is part of the School District 5 Southeast Kootenay. The current building was opened in 2008, and its facilities include 22 classrooms, gymnasium), library and computers.
