= Evah McKowan =

Canadian writer (1885–1962)

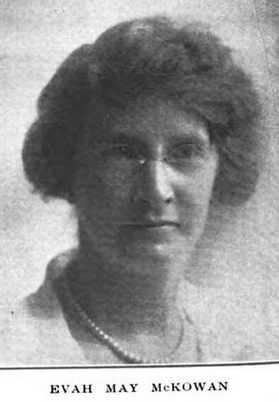
Evah McKowan, from a 1922 publication

Evah May McKowan (February 6, 1885 – February 22, 1962) was a Canadian writer.

== Early life ==
Evah May Cartwright was born at Carlisle, Ontario, the daughter of George Cartwright and Clara Cartwright. As a teen she moved west with her parents and three younger sisters, and lived much of her adulthood in Cranbrook, British Columbia. She remembered skiing with her students when she was a teacher in 1903. Cartwright said that she and her sister were the first girls in the area of Kimberley, British Columbia to ski.

== Career ==
McKowan published two novels. Janet of Kootenay (1919) is about a young single woman who buys and runs a farm named "Arcadia" in British Columbia, told in a series of letters to her friend back east. Janet Kirk, the title character, eventually marries a disabled veteran of World War I, making the book a "surprisingly progressive" and timely romance in its day. McKowan's second book, Graydon of the Windermere (1920) is a "bright breezy story of adventure and love", about a Toronto man who moves west.

She served on the British Columbia provincial committee of the Canadian Authors Association, and addressed the association's annual convention in 1937. She took over as president of her husband's business, Cranbrook Sash and Door, upon his death in 1947. She sold the business in 1956.

== Personal life ==
Evah Cartwright married lumberman Harry A. McKowan in 1907; they had four daughters. She was widowed in 1947, and died in Cranbrook on February 22, 1962.
