= Terex 33-19 "Titan" =

Prototype off-highway ultra class haul truck

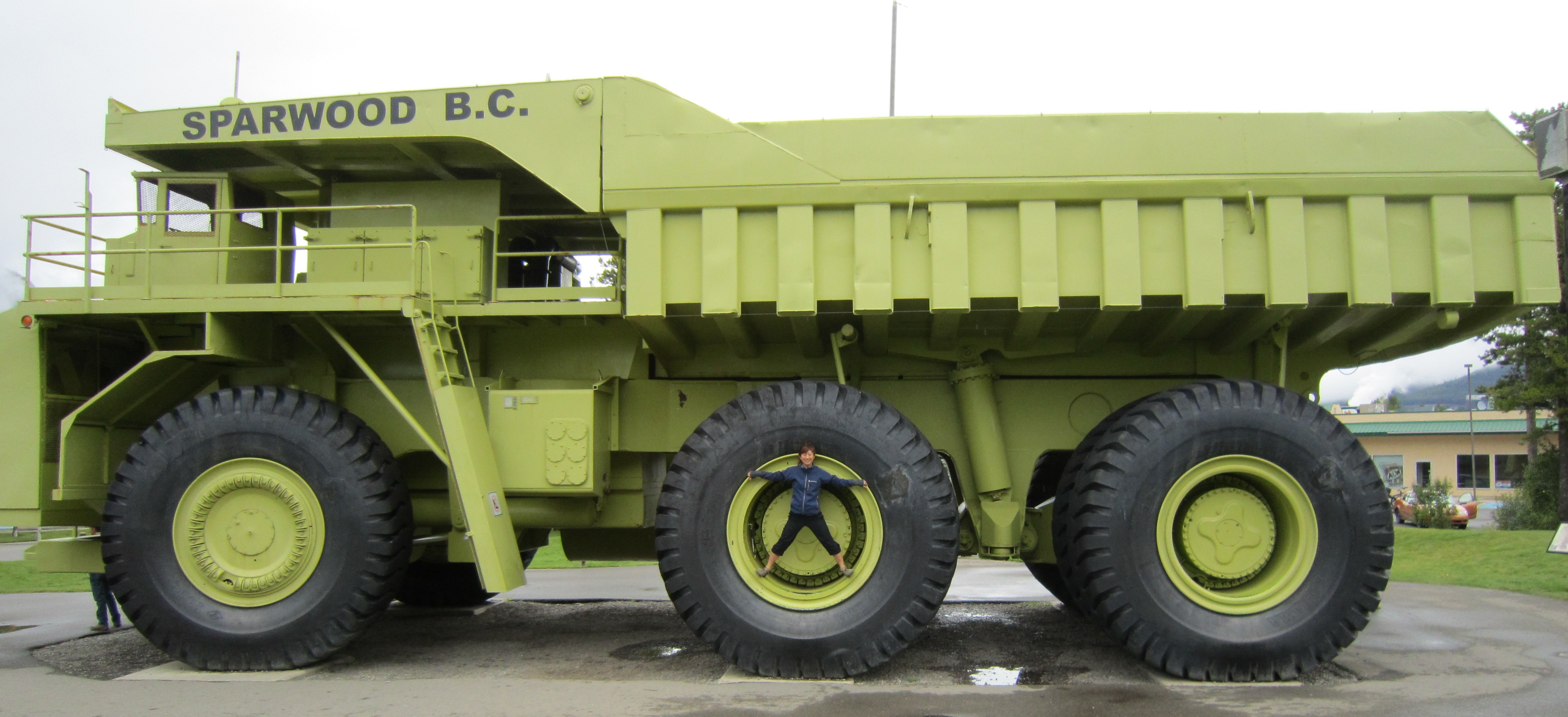

Overview
- Manufacturer: General Motors Corporation Terex Division
- Production: 1973 (prototype)
- Assembly: London, Ontario, Canada

Body and chassis
- Class: Ultra
- Body style: Dump
- Layout: FR (Front-engine, rear-wheel drive)

Powertrain
- Engine: 10,343 cubic inches (169.49 L) EMD 16-645E4 V-16 (t/c diesel)
- Transmission: EMD AR10-D14 10-pole, AC electric alternator to rectifier; 4 General Motors D79CF traction motors

Dimensions
- Wheelbase: 29 ft 11 in (9.12 m)
- Length: 66 ft 9 in (20.35 m)
- Width: 25 ft 7 in (7.80 m)
- Height: 22 ft 7 in (6.88 m)
- Curb weight: GVWR 509,000 lb (230.88 t)

The Terex 33-19 "Titan" was a prototype off-highway, ultra class, rigid frame, three-axle, Diesel–electric powertrain (AC) haul truck designed by the Terex Division of General Motors and assembled at General Motors Diesel Division's London, ON, Canada assembly plant in 1973. Only one 33-19 was ever produced and it was the largest, highest capacity haul truck in the world for 25 years. After 13 years in service, the 33-19 was restored and is now preserved on static display as a tourist attraction in Sparwood, BC, Canada.

== Development and production ==
General Motors developed the Titan in response to the need for more efficient haul trucks by open pit mine operators. GM believed that a general decrease in mineral ore quality combined with a projected need to mine tar shale and tar sands would increase the quantity of ore hauled by surface mine operators' trucks, worldwide. The Titan was the largest in the Terex 33 series of off-road haul trucks, which also included the 33–03, 33–05, 33–07, 33–09, 33-11 and the 33–15. The 33-19 and the 33-15 both used diesel/AC electric powertrains, while the other, smaller members of the 33 series of haul trucks used mechanical powertrains.

The Titan was assembled at the General Motors Diesel Division's assembly plant in London, Ontario, Canada, in 1973. The Titan was first shown to the public in October 1974 at the American Mining Congress in Las Vegas, NV.

GM predicted that when the Titan entered regular production, it would cost approximately US$1.5 million in 1976 (approximately $6.42 million in 2024). However, the Titan never entered regular production. The worldwide coal market softened in the late 1970s, causing coal mines to decrease production and economize by rebuilding existing equipment or purchasing smaller haul trucks with proven operational records. The projected market for the 33-19 "Titan" never materialized and the prototype was the only unit ever assembled.

== Service history ==
Terex put the Titan into service with Kaiser Steel at its iron mine at Eagle Mountain, California, in January 1975. The Titan experienced frequent downtime, but hauled approximately 3.5 million short tons (7.0 billion lb; 3.2 billion kg) of earth over the course of its four years of service at the Eagle Mountain mine.

In late 1978, the Titan was sent to Kaiser Steel's mine at Sparwood, British Columbia, Canada. The mine was acquired from Kaiser Steel by B. C. Resources in 1980. When the mine was subsequently acquired by Westar Mining in 1983, the Titan was repainted from its original Terex lime green livery to Westar Mining's blue and yellow livery. Shortly after, Westar Mining purchased the Titan from General Motors for US$200,000 ($527,781 in 2025) and $1 million of spare parts ($2.64 million in 2025). During Westar Mining's ownership, the Titan had an uptime rate of more than 70% and regularly hauled loads exceeding 350 short tons (700,000 lb; 320,000 kg). Westar Mining retired the Titan from service in 1991.

== Public display ==
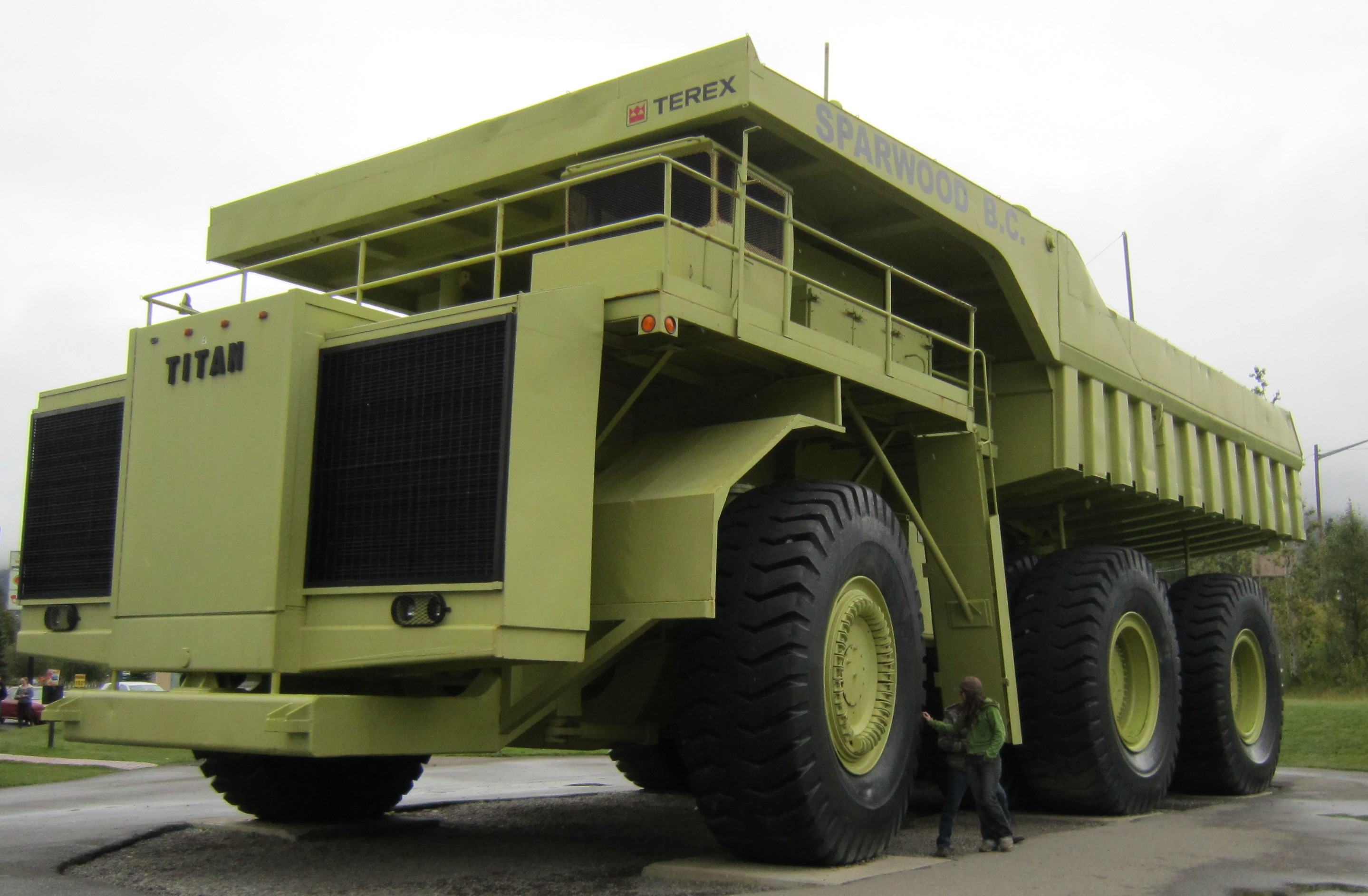
Front view of the restored 33-19 "Titan" on static display in Sparwood, B.C., shown in "Terex green" livery.

After acquiring the Sparwood Mine in late 1992, Teck Corporation offered the Titan for preservation as a public monument in 1993. The Sparwood, British Columbia Chamber of Commerce completed a fund raising effort, restored the Titan, and promotes it as a tourist attraction. The Titan is on static display off Highway 3 in Titan Park, 126B Aspen Drive, Sparwood, British Columbia, Canada. Although the 33-19 "Titan" was restored, the engine has been removed.

The Titan played a starring role in a 1977 Terex television commercial alongside golfing great Jack Nicklaus. The commercial opens with Nicklaus standing in the loaded bed of the Titan, hitting golf balls, and ends with a panorama of Nicklaus standing amidst several then-current Terex products.

== Specifications ==
The Titan has a payload capacity of 350 short tons (700,000 lb; 320,000 kg), a net vehicle weight of 509,500 pounds (231,100 kg; 254.8 short tons) and a gross vehicle weight of 1,209,500 pounds (548,600 kg; 604.8 short tons). Fully loaded, the Titan had a top speed of 29.8 mph (48.0 km/h). At the time of its construction in 1973, the Titan was the largest, highest payload capacity truck ever built. The Titan remained the highest capacity haul truck in existence for 25 years until the début of the 360-short-ton (720,000 lb; 330,000 kg) payload capacity Caterpillar 797 in September 1998.

The Titan used a diesel/AC electric powertrain that consisted of an Electro-Motive Division model 16-645E4, 16-cylinder, gross 3,300 hp (2,461 kW), 10,320-cubic-inch (169.1 L), turbocharged, intercooled, unit injection, locomotive engine directly coupled to an Electro-Motive Division model AR10-D14, 10-pole, AC electric alternator sending DC power via a rectifier to General Motors model D79CF traction motors at each of the four paired rear wheels. The Titan utilized a power, all-wheel steering system. The front wheels swept through a 71-degree arc. At a preset point as the front wheels moved off-center, the eight rear wheels would also begin to steer, moving up to a maximum of 10 degrees off center. The Titan required ten 40.00x57 tires.

== See also ==
- Haul truck
