= School District 5 Southeast Kootenay =

School district in British Columbia, Canada

- School District 5 Southeast Kootenay Logo

Address
- 940 Industrial Road #1, Cranbrook British Columbia; Canada

District information
- Superintendent: Viveka Johnson
- Schools: 22
- Budget: CA$44.3 million

Students and staff
- Students: 5,733

Other information
- Website: www.sd5.bc.ca

School District 5 Southeast Kootenay is a school district in British Columbia. It covers the southeast corner of the province up to the Alberta and Montana borders. This includes the major centres of Cranbrook, Fernie, Elkford, and Sparwood.

== History ==
School District 5 was formed in 1996 by the amalgamation of School District 1 Fernie and School District 2 Cranbrook.

== Schools ==
School	Location	Grades
Gordon Terrace Elementary School	Cranbrook	K–6
Highlands Elementary School	Cranbrook	K–6
Pinewood Elementary School	Cranbrook	K–6
Steeples Elementary School	Cranbrook	K–6
T M Roberts Elementary School	Cranbrook	K–6
Kootenay Orchards Elementary School	Cranbrook	K–6
Kootenay Educational Services (Alternate program)	Cranbrook	K–12
Laurie Middle School	Cranbrook	7–9
Parkland Middle School	Cranbrook	7–9
District Learning Centre (Continuing education)	Cranbrook	9–12
Mount Baker Secondary School	Cranbrook	10–12
Rocky Mountain Elementary School	Elkford	K–6
Elkford Secondary School	Elkford	7–12
Isabella Dicken Elementary School	Fernie	K–7
Fernie Secondary School	Fernie	7–12
Grasmere Elementary School	Grasmere	K–4
Jaffray Elementary Junior Secondary School	Jaffray	K–10
Frank J Mitchell Elementary School	Sparwood	K–7
Sparwood Secondary School	Sparwood	7–12

== Defunct ==
- Muriel Baxter Elementary School (Cranbrook, British Columbia) closed December 31, 2007 because of declining student population. (Last day of classes June 2008)
- Max Turyk Elementary School (Fernie, British Columbia) closed June 30, 2007 because of declining student population.
- Mountain View Elementary School (Sparwood, British Columbia) closed June 30, 2008
- Elkford Elementary School (Elkford, British Columbia) closed in early 2000s and purchased by the District of Elkford in 2007. The building was destroyed by an electrical fire that same year.
- Amy Woodland Elementary School (Cranbrook, British Columbia) closed since June 2024 due to a fire. The provincial government has indicated it will be rebuilt, but no timeline has been released.

== See also ==
- List of school districts in British Columbia
