= Pete Davis (politician) =

Canadian politician

The Honourable Pete Davis MLA
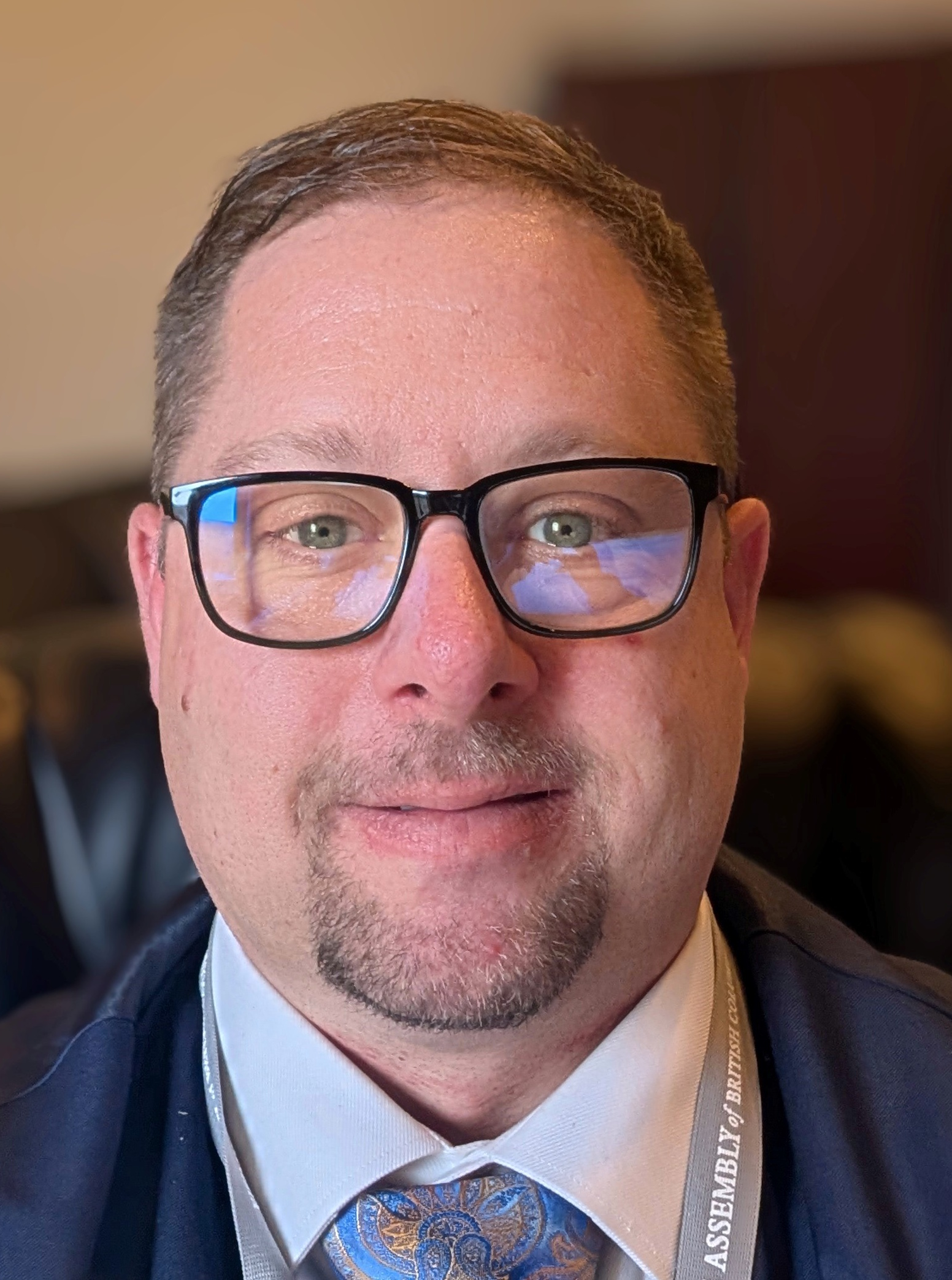
- Davis in 2025

Member of the British Columbia Legislative Assembly for Kootenay-Rockies
- Incumbent
- Assumed office October 19, 2024
- Preceded by: Tom Shypitka

Minister of State for Mining
- Incumbent
- Assumed office November 20, 2026
- Preceded by: Office Established

Personal details
- Party: BC Conservative

Pete Davis MLA is a Canadian politician who has served as a member of the Legislative Assembly of British Columbia (MLA) representing the electoral district of Kootenay-Rockies since 2024. He is a member of the Conservative Party.

== Early life and career ==
Davis is originally from Revelstoke and was raised by a single mother in Cranbrook. He has been married to his wife, Heather, since 2002, and together they have four children. Davis considers himself an avid outdoorsmen and has strong ties to the camping, boating, and motorcycle communities.

Davis is an experienced business professional who has cultivated relationships with stakeholders from sectors including logging, forestry, automotive, heavy equipment, and mining across the Elk Valley and East Kootenays. Prior to becoming an elected official, Davis was involved in federal politics for 7 years working with the Kootenay-Columbia Conservative Electoral District Association.

== Political career ==
On March 25, 2024, Davis was nominated as the Conservative Party of BC's candidate for the riding of Kootenay-Rockies. He went on to win the election, defeating incumbent MLA Tom Shypitka with 42.7% of the vote. He currently serves in the official opposition shadow cabinet as the Critic for Mining.

== Electoral history ==
2026 British Columbia general election: Kootenay-Rockies
** Preliminary results — Not yet official **
| Party | Candidate | Votes | % | ±% |
|---|---|---|---|---|
| Conservative | Pete Davis | 9,389 | 55.98 | |
| New Democratic | Norma Blissett | 4,586 | 27.34 | |
| Green | Keenan Dennehy | 1,205 | 7.19 | |
| OneBC | AJ Wolfe | 888 | 5.29 | – |
| CentreBC | Paul Heywood | 671 | 4.00 | – |
| Total valid votes | | 16,739 | 99.81 | |
| Total rejected ballots | | 32 | 0.19 | |
| Turnout | | 16,771 | | |
| Registered voters | | | | |
Source: Elections BC
| Conservative hold | | Swing | | +4.10 |

2024 British Columbia general election: Kootenay-Rockies
| Party | Candidate | Votes | % | ±% | Expenditures |
|---|---|---|---|---|---|
| Conservative | Pete Davis | 8,217 | 42.71 | – | $66,181.76 |
| Independent | Tom Shypitka | 5,844 | 30.37 | -27.0 | $33,456.11 |
| New Democratic | Sam Atwal | 4,184 | 21.75 | -11.2 | $23,254.71 |
| Green | Kerri Wall | 996 | 5.18 | -4.6 | $11,054.43 |
| Total valid votes/expense limit | | 19,241 | 99.89 | – | $71,700.08 |
| Total rejected ballots | | 21 | 0.11 | – | |
| Turnout | | 19,262 | 60.79 | – | |
| Registered voters | | 31,684 | | | |
| Conservative notional gain from BC United | | Swing | | +34.9 (Note: Swing against BC United incumbent Tom Shypitka, standing for re-election as an independent candidate.) | |
Source: Elections BC

== See also ==
- 43rd Parliament of British Columbia
