= Elkford Secondary School =

High school in Elkford, British Columbia, Canada

Elkford Secondary
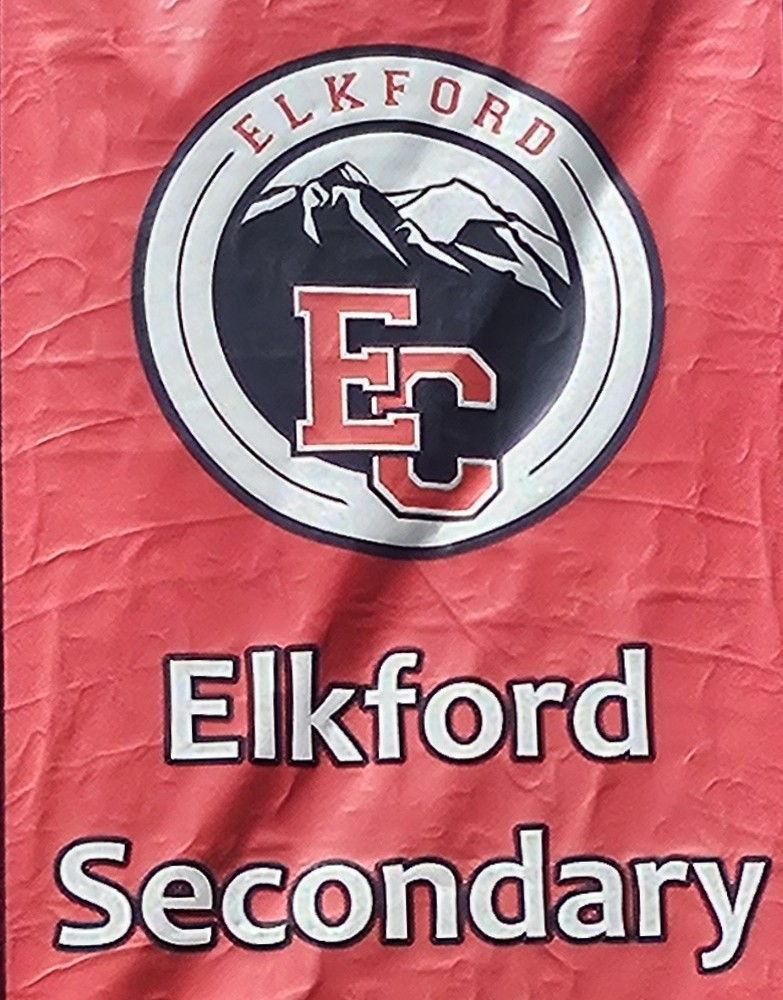

Location
- 2500A Balmer Drive; Elkford, British Columbia, V0B 1H0; Canada
- Coordinates: 50.00676°N 114.9305°W

Information
- School type: Public, high school
- School board: School District 5 Southeast Kootenay
- School number: 501016
- Principal: Thomas Skelton
- Staff: 33
- Grades: 7-12
- Enrollment: 245 (2025)
- Team name: Celtics
- Website: sd5.bc.ca/ess

Elkford Secondary is a public high school in Elkford, British Columbia part of School District 5 Southeast Kootenay.
