= Mount Baker Secondary School =

Mount Baker Secondary

Location
- 1410 Baker Street; Cranbrook, British Columbia, V1C 1B2; Canada; 49.51263°N 115.76074°W

Information
- School type: Public, high school
- School board: School District 5 Southeast Kootenay
- School number: 502001
- Principal: Aaron Thorn
- Staff: 60
- Grades: 10-12
- Enrollment: 868 (2025/2026)
- Colours: Black, red, white
- Mascot: Wild Bear
- Team name: Wild
- Website: www.mbss.sd5.bc.ca
- Last updated: October 3, 2026

Mount Baker Secondary School is the only public high school in Cranbrook, British Columbia, Canada. It is part of School District 5 Southeast Kootenay. Mount Baker Secondary School accommodates approximately 900 Grade 10 - 12 students and is the largest high school in the district. Mount Baker offers a large variety of courses, academic programs, and AAAA and AAA Athletics.
