= Anne Edwards (politician) =

Canadian politician (1935–2022)

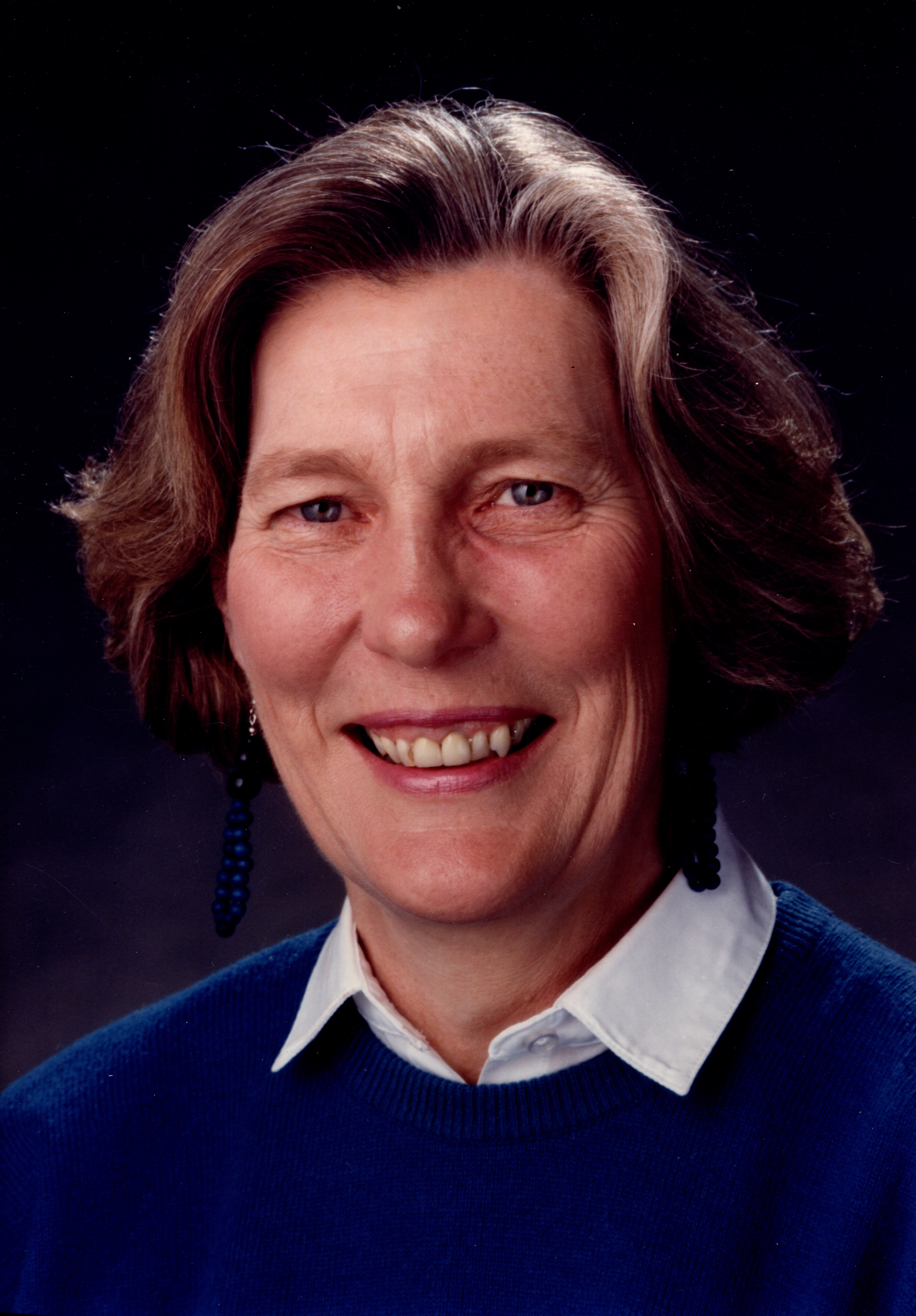

Member of the British Columbia Legislative Assembly for Kootenay
- In office October 22, 1986 – May 28, 1996
- Preceded by: Terry Segarty
- Succeeded by: Erda Walsh

Minister of Energy, Mines and Petroleum Resources
- In office November 5, 1991 – February 22, 1996
- Premier: Michael Harcourt
- Preceded by: Jack Weisgerber
- Succeeded by: Dan Miller

Personal details
- Born: Kathleen Anne Stothers; June 6, 1935 Tisdale, Saskatchewan, Canada
- Died: October 15, 2022 (aged 87) Calgary, Alberta, Canada
- Party: NDP
- Spouse: Mike Edwards

Kathleen Anne Edwards (née Stothers; June 6, 1935 – October 15, 2022) was a Canadian politician. She served as MLA for the Kootenay riding in the Legislative Assembly of British Columbia from 1986 to 1996, as a member of the British Columbia New Democratic Party. Edwards served as British Columbia's first female Minister for Energy, Mines and Petroleum Resources in the government of Michael Harcourt (1991–1996). Anne Edwards was also the author of Seeking Balance: Conversations with BC Women in Politics (Caitlin Press Inc, 2008). Edwards died in Calgary, Alberta on October 15, 2022.
