= Terry Segarty =

Canadian politician

Member of the British Columbia Legislative Assembly for Kootenay
- In office May 10, 1979 – October 22, 1986
- Preceded by: George Wayne Haddad
- Succeeded by: Anne Edwards

Personal details
- Born: November 4, 1946 (age 79) Ireland
- Party: Liberal; Social Credit (1979-1986)
- Occupation: Mechanic; Property Manager

Terence Patrick Segarty (born November 4, 1946) is an Irish-born mechanic, businessman and former political figure in British Columbia. He represented Kootenay in the Legislative Assembly of British Columbia from 1979 to 1986 as a Social Credit member.

== Biography ==
Terry Segarty was the son of Robert Segarty and Christine Gilligan and was educated in Ireland. In 1969, he married Hillary Mary Fitzpatrick. Segarty lived in Cranbrook, Canada. He was defeated by Anne Edwards when he ran for reelection to the assembly in 1986 and then defeated by her again in the 1991 provincial election. Segarty served in the provincial cabinet as Minister of Labour. He was the president of 2 Baker Developments Ltd, Terrim Property Management Ltd, O'Shea's Entertainment Inc and Birchwood Building Corporation. Segarty was also a director for the Cranbrook Regional Hospital and served on the board for the Royal British Columbia Museum.
