= George Wayne Haddad =

Canadian politician

MLA for Kootenay
- In office 1975–1979

Personal details
- Born: September 5, 1912 Fernie, British Columbia
- Died: October 12, 1995 (aged 83) Cranbrook, British Columbia
- Party: British Columbia Social Credit Party
- Spouse: Elizabeth Ann Foster (m. 1932)

George Wayne Haddad (September 5, 1912 – October 12, 1995) was a car dealer and political figure in British Columbia. He represented Kootenay in the Legislative Assembly of British Columbia from 1975 to 1979 as a Social Credit member.

He was born in Fernie, British Columbia, the son of Abraham Farhat Haddad and Rose Rahal, and was educated in Fernie and Cranbrook. In 1931, Haddad married Elizabeth Ann Foster. He ran unsuccessfully for the Liberal Party in Cranbrook in the 1953 provincial election. He served as mayor of Cranbrook from 1961 to 1969. Haddad was an amateur magician.
