= Sparwood =

- District municipality
- District of Sparwood
- Location of Sparwood in British Columbia
- Coordinates: 49°43′56″N 114°53′13″W
- Country: Canada
- Province: British Columbia

Government
  - Mayor: David Wilks
  - Governing body: Sparwood council
  - MP: Rob Morrison
  - MLA: Tom Shypitka

Area
  - Total: 191.60 km^{2} (73.98 sq mi)
- Elevation: 1,140 m (3,740 ft)

Population (2021)
  - Total: 3,990
  - Density: 463.5/km^{2} (1,200/sq mi)
- Time zone: UTC−7 (Mountain Standard (MST))
  - Summer (DST): UTC−6 (MDT)
- Area code: 250 / 778 / 236
- Highways: Highway 3 Highway 43
- Website: sparwood.ca

Sparwood is a district municipality in the Canadian province of British Columbia. It is the second-largest community on the Elk River.

Located approximately 30 kilometres from Fernie, Sparwood has approximately 4,200 residents. The municipality is quite large geographically for its population, taking up an area of 191.01 square kilometres and incorporating local coal mines.

In the late 1800s, there was a railroad stop known as Sparwood, which was so named because of the trees from this area being shipped to the coast for manufacturing spars for ocean vessels.

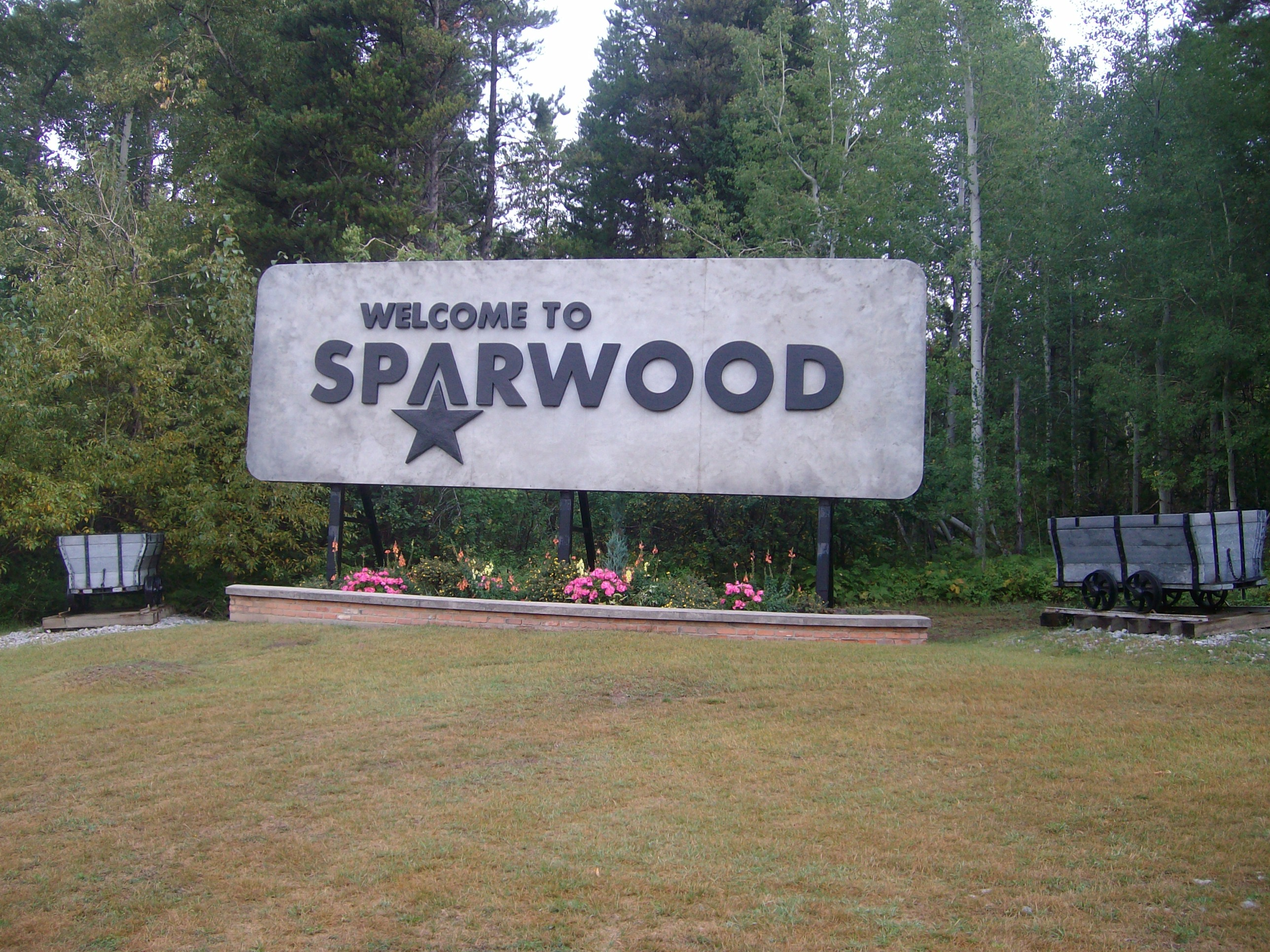
Sparwood's welcome sign

== Economy ==
The local economy is heavily dependent on steel-making coal mining, one of British Columbia's primary industries. A large part of the population either works in the mines or as tradespeople and labourers in related support industries, such as trucking or as mechanics. Logging is another important industry.

Sparwood/Elk Valley Airport is the local airport for general aviation. The closest airport with commercial service is Cranbrook/Canadian Rockies International Airport. Road access is provided by the Crowsnest Highway.

Sparwood was formed on 12 May 1966 accepting people from the nearby towns of Michel, Natal, and Middletown (an urban renewal). Since the beginning of Sparwood, it has experienced many ups and downs in coal mining, the town's primary industry.

== Attractions ==
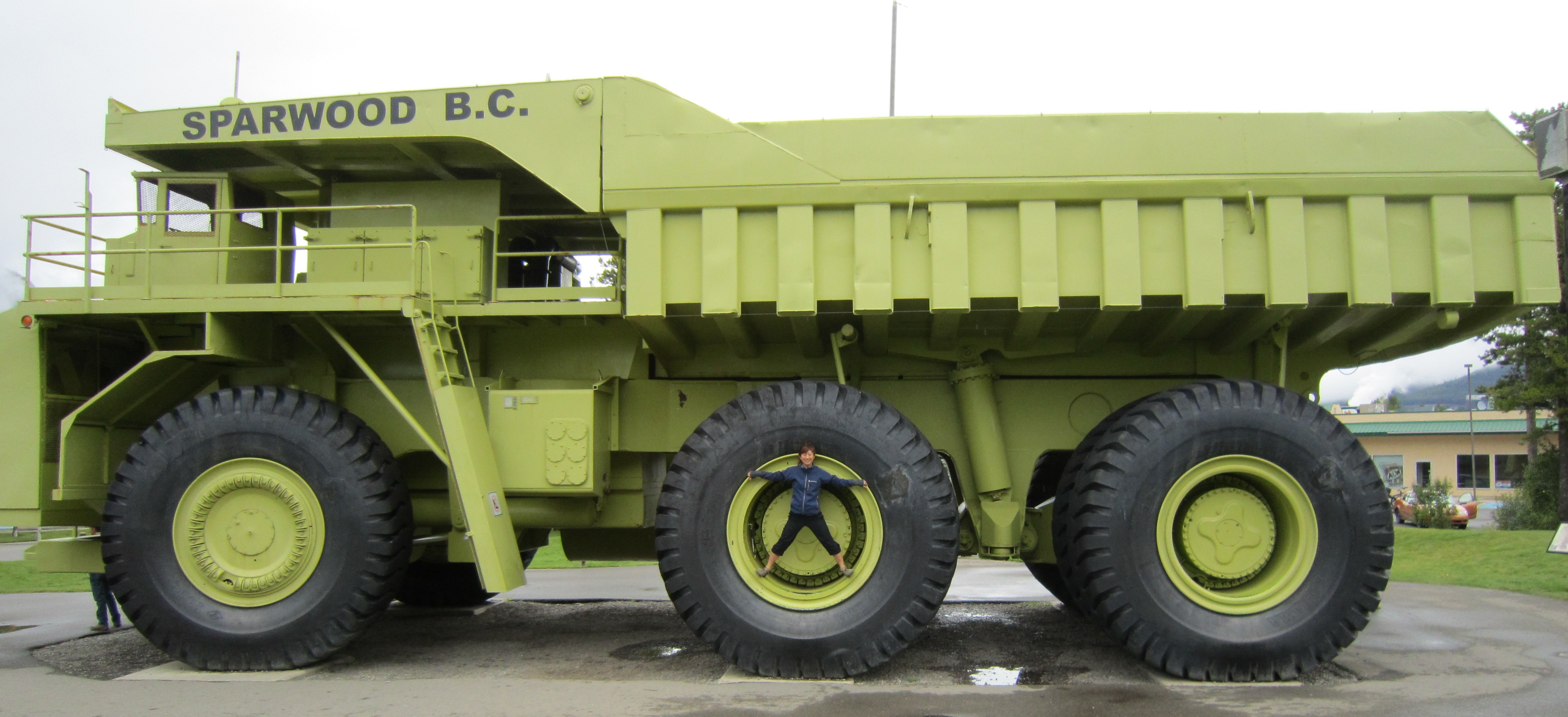
Terex Titan in Sparwood

Sparwood promotes itself extensively as the home of the Terex Titan, at one time the largest truck in the world. The green Titan, in service at Sparwood between 1978 and 1991, stands a few yards from the Crowsnest Highway where it can attract the attention of tourists and travellers. The adjacent tourist information centre serves visitors to the district municipality and the wider area.

Sparwood is distinguished by mural art which depicts something of the history of the former Michel-Natal mining communities.

== Sports ==
Club	League	Sport	Venue	Established	Championships
Fernie Ghostriders	KIJHL	Ice hockey	Elk Valley Leisure Centre	1991	3

Sparwood is home to the 2011 BC provincial champion boys snowboarding team. Sparwood is also home to the 2011 Junior Boys and 2012 Junior Girls Provincial Bowling champions.

Laurie Hockridge of Sparwood and Lethbridge College, is a CCAA-ACSC Hall of Fame inductee (WBB, 1987–1990). Her legacy includes back-to-back national championships and two national championship MVP trophies.

=== Fernie Memorial Arena disaster ===
On 17 October 2017, an ammonia leak at the Fernie Memorial Arena killed three workers (two City of Fernie employees and one CIMCO refrigeration employee from Calgary) during the Fernie Ghostriders' regular season. Because of this tragedy, the City of Fernie declared a state of emergency and people had to evacuate the area for days. The Ghostriders were relocated because of this to the Elk Valley Leisure Centre in Sparwood during the 2017–18 KIJHL season until the City of Fernie installed a new chiller unit. The Ghostriders now play at their home rink again.

== Demographics ==
In the 2021 Canadian census conducted by Statistics Canada, Sparwood had a population of 3,990 living in 1,815 of its 2,101 total private dwellings, a change of 9.6% from its 2016 population of 3,646. With a land area of 191.3 km^{2} (73.9 sq mi), it had a population density of 21.7/km^{2} (56.2/sq mi) in 2021.

=== Ethnicity ===
Panethnic groups in the District of Sparwood (1986−2021)
Panethnic group	2021		2016		2011		2006		2001		1996		1991		1986	
Panethnic group	Pop.	%	Pop.	%	Pop.	%	Pop.	%	Pop.	%	Pop.	%	Pop.	%	Pop.	%
European (Note: Statistic includes all persons that did not make up part of a visible minority or an indigenous identity.)	3,565	85.9%	3,255	86%	3,310	90.31%	3,370	93.09%	3,570	93.7%	3,745	94.1%	3,780	91.41%	4,205	92.62%
Indigenous	420	10.12%	275	7.27%	260	7.09%	115	3.18%	125	3.28%	155	3.89%	195	4.72%	140	3.08%
African	55	1.33%	85	2.25%	0	0%	0	0%	35	0.92%	10	0.25%	0	0%	5	0.11%
South Asian	35	0.84%	80	2.11%	50	1.36%	40	1.1%	60	1.57%	40	1.01%	140	3.39%	155	3.41%
Southeast Asian (Note: Statistic includes total responses of "Filipino" and "Southeast Asian" under visible minority section on census.)	20	0.48%	45	1.19%	15	0.41%	0	0%	10	0.26%	10	0.25%	0	0%	5	0.11%
Latin American	20	0.48%	15	0.4%	0	0%	0	0%	10	0.26%	0	0%	0	0%	5	0.11%
East Asian (Note: Statistic includes total responses of "Chinese", "Korean", and "Japanese" under visible minority section on census.)	15	0.36%	25	0.66%	15	0.41%	25	0.69%	10	0.26%	15	0.38%	20	0.48%	25	0.55%
Middle Eastern (Note: Statistic includes total responses of "West Asian" and "Arab" under visible minority section on census.)	0	0%	10	0.26%	0	0%	60	1.66%	0	0%	0	0%	0	0%	0	0%
Other/multiracial (Note: Statistic includes total responses of "Visible minority, n.i.e." and "Multiple visible minorities" under visible minority section on census.)	0	0%	10	0.26%	0	0%	0	0%	10	0.26%	0	0%	—N/a	—N/a	—N/a	—N/a
Total responses	4,150	100.05%	3,785	100.03%	3,665	99.95%	3,620	100.06%	3,810	99.95%	3,980	99.95%	4,135	98.2%	4,540	100%
Total population	4,148	100%	3,784	100%	3,667	100%	3,618	100%	3,812	100%	3,982	100%	4,211	100%	4,540	100%
Note: Totals greater than 100% due to multiple origin responses.

=== Religion ===
According to the 2021 census, religious groups in Sparwood included:

- Irreligion (2,405 persons or 58.0%)
- Christianity (1,695 persons or 40.8%)
- Islam (15 persons or 0.4%)

Religious groups in Sparwood (1991–2021)
Religious group	2021		2011		2001		1991	
Religious group	Pop.	%	Pop.	%	Pop.	%	Pop.	%
Christian	1,695	40.84%	2,000	54.64%	2,525	66.27%	3,080	74.49%
Muslim	15	0.36%	20	0.55%	0	0%	0	0%
Hindu	0	0%	30	0.82%	25	0.66%	0	0%
Sikh	0	0%	0	0%	30	0.79%	140	3.39%
Buddhist	0	0%	0	0%	0	0%	0	0%
Jewish	0	0%	0	0%	10	0.26%	0	0%
Indigenous spirituality	0	0%	0	0%	N/A	N/A	N/A	N/A
Other religion	0	0%	0	0%	10	0.26%	0	0%
Irreligious	2,405	57.95%	1,580	43.17%	1,220	32.02%	905	21.89%
Total responses	4,150	100.05%	3,660	96.72%	3,810	99.95%	4,135	98.2%

== Education ==
There are two public schools in Sparwood: Frank J Mitchell which is an Elementary School and the new Sparwood Secondary School. These schools are operated by School District 5 Southeast Kootenay which is based in Cranbrook.

== Climate ==
Sparwood has a warm-summer humid continental climate (Köppen Dfb) with relatively cold and very snowy winters combined with moderately warm summers with relatively high diurnal temperature variation. As a result of the low overnight lows in summer, September's mean of 10.5 °C (50.9 °F) places Sparwood just above subarctic climates (Dfc) in classification.

Climate data for Sparwood
Month	Jan	Feb	Mar	Apr	May	Jun	Jul	Aug	Sep	Oct	Nov	Dec	Year
Record high °C (°F)	11.9 (53.4)	13.8 (56.8)	20.6 (69.1)	25.6 (78.1)	31.3 (88.3)	32.5 (90.5)	34.9 (94.8)	36.5 (97.7)	34.2 (93.6)	27.2 (81.0)	16.9 (62.4)	10.5 (50.9)	36.5 (97.7)
Mean daily maximum °C (°F)	−2.2 (28.0)	0.5 (32.9)	5.4 (41.7)	10.9 (51.6)	15.9 (60.6)	19.6 (67.3)	23.8 (74.8)	24.2 (75.6)	18.2 (64.8)	10.7 (51.3)	1.7 (35.1)	−3.4 (25.9)	10.4 (50.7)
Daily mean °C (°F)	−6.5 (20.3)	−4.5 (23.9)	0.2 (32.4)	4.8 (40.6)	9.1 (48.4)	12.7 (54.9)	15.8 (60.4)	15.5 (59.9)	10.5 (50.9)	4.8 (40.6)	−2 (28)	−7.3 (18.9)	4.4 (39.9)
Mean daily minimum °C (°F)	−10.7 (12.7)	−9.6 (14.7)	−5.1 (22.8)	−1.3 (29.7)	2.3 (36.1)	5.8 (42.4)	7.7 (45.9)	6.7 (44.1)	2.9 (37.2)	−1.1 (30.0)	−5.6 (21.9)	−11.3 (11.7)	−1.6 (29.1)
Record low °C (°F)	−40.3 (−40.5)	−34.6 (−30.3)	−29.9 (−21.8)	−15 (5)	−6.7 (19.9)	−3.3 (26.1)	0 (32)	−3.5 (25.7)	−8.5 (16.7)	−22.2 (−8.0)	−34 (−29)	−39.8 (−39.6)	−39.8 (−39.6)
Average precipitation mm (inches)	53.9 (2.12)	40.9 (1.61)	44.2 (1.74)	41.4 (1.63)	60.4 (2.38)	69.3 (2.73)	46.8 (1.84)	34.9 (1.37)	47.4 (1.87)	48.8 (1.92)	72.1 (2.84)	53.4 (2.10)	613.3 (24.15)
Average rainfall mm (inches)	17.3 (0.68)	12.4 (0.49)	17 (0.7)	27.9 (1.10)	52 (2.0)	67.7 (2.67)	46.8 (1.84)	34.8 (1.37)	43.4 (1.71)	39.6 (1.56)	39.1 (1.54)	13.2 (0.52)	411 (16.2)
Average snowfall cm (inches)	50.4 (19.8)	37 (15)	31.7 (12.5)	17.4 (6.9)	8.6 (3.4)	1.8 (0.7)	0 (0)	0.1 (0.0)	4.2 (1.7)	11.3 (4.4)	47.3 (18.6)	54.2 (21.3)	264 (104)

== Local media ==
=== Newspapers ===
- Fernie Free Press – Weekly Paper
- Kootenay News Advertiser – Weekly Paper
- Fernie Fix – Monthly Glossy Magazine

=== Radio stations ===
- 99.1 FM – CJDR, a rebroadcaster of CHDR-FM, rock
- 92.7 FM – CFBZ, a rebroadcaster of CHBZ-FM, country
- 97.7 FM – CBTN, a rebroadcaster of CBTK-FM, CBC
- 107.9 FM – CFSM-FM – adult contemporary

=== Cable television stations ===
- Channel 10: Shaw TV
- Channel 5: CFCN, CTV
- Channel 13: CBUT, CBC

== Notable people ==
The following people were born in Sparwood:

- Daryl Boyle (born 1987), professional ice hockey player
- Michelle Loughery (born 1961), muralist
- Niki Sharma, politician

== Sister cities ==
Since 1980, Sparwood has been the sister city of Kamisunagawa in Hokkaido, Japan.

== See also ==
- Fernie Ghostriders
- Elk River
- Elk Valley
- Kootenay Ice
- Regional District of East Kootenay#Municipalities
