= Flats Sequencing System =

Mail sorting system used by the US Postal Service

Flats Sequencing System (FSS) is an automated system used by the US Postal Service. It uses a dual pass sort technique to sort flats all the way to delivery sequence order. Prior to the deployment of FSS machines, flats were machine sorted to the route level only. Carriers had to manually sort all the flats they were to deliver into proper delivery order before they could embark on their routes. With FSS, when the carrier receives them they are ready to be delivered without need for any further manual sorting.

FSS machines are manufactured by Northrop Grumman. Deployment began in 2008.
