= MDT =

MDT may refer to:

== Organizations ==
- Medtronic, an Irish medical technology company
- Minnesota Dance Theatre, a dance school and company

== Science, medicine and technology ==
- Maggot debridement therapy
- Microsoft Deployment Toolkit
- Mobile data terminal
- Mode deactivation therapy
- Map code for "moderate" in severe weather terminology
- Mechanical Diagnosis and Therapy, a form of physical therapy
- Mean down time, the average time that a system is non-operational
- Mountain Daylight Time, in North America

== Transportation ==
- Harrisburg International Airport, IATA code MDT
- Miami-Dade Transit
- Montana Department of Transportation
