= Tom Shypitka =

Canadian politician and curler

Member of the British Columbia Legislative Assembly for Kootenay East
- In office May 9, 2017 – September 21, 2024
- Preceded by: Bill Bennett
- Succeeded by: Pete Davis

Personal details
- Party: BC United

Tom Shypitka
Medal record

Curling

Labatt Brier
Bronze medal – third place	1991 Hamilton	

Thomas Glenn Shypitka is a Canadian politician, who was elected to the Legislative Assembly of British Columbia in the 2017 provincial election. He represented the electoral district of Kootenay East as a member of the BC United caucus. In Opposition, he has served as the Official Opposition Critic for Energy and Mines; Energy, Mines and Low Carbon Innovation; and Mines and Low Carbon Innovation. He was also appointed B.C. United caucus chair (2024) and deputy chair of the Select Standing Committee on Finance and Government Services (2023-2024).

Shypitka is also an accomplished curler, having represented British Columbia at the 1991 Labatt Brier and 2010 Tim Hortons Brier. He has appeared at the Brier as both a right and left handed thrower (right handed in 1991, left handed in 2010), due to a knee injury.

In the 2024 British Columbia general election, he ran as an independent but was unseated by Pete Davis from the Conservative Party of British Columbia.

On October 17, 2026, Shypitka was elected Mayor of Cranbrook, British Columbia .

== Electoral record ==
2024 British Columbia general election: Kootenay-Rockies
Party	Candidate	Votes	%	±%	Expenditures
Conservative	Pete Davis	8,217	42.71	–	$66,181.76
Independent	Tom Shypitka	5,844	30.37	-27.0	$33,456.11
New Democratic	Sam Atwal	4,184	21.75	-11.2	$23,254.71
Green	Kerri Wall	996	5.18	-4.6	$11,054.43
Total valid votes/expense limit		19,241	99.89	–	$71,700.08
Total rejected ballots		21	0.11	–	
Turnout		19,262	60.79	–	
Registered voters		31,684			
Conservative notional gain from BC United		Swing		+34.9 (Note: Swing against BC United incumbent Tom Shypitka, standing for re-election as an independent candidate.)	
Source: Elections BC

2020 British Columbia general election: Kootenay East
Party	Candidate	Votes	%	±%	Expenditures
Liberal	Tom Shypitka	9,897	57.90	+1.33	$38,182.15
New Democratic	Wayne Stetski	5,499	32.17	+2.5	$19,605.32
Green	Kerri Wall	1,697	9.93	−1.34	$3,805.90
Total valid votes		17,093	100.00	–	
Total rejected ballots					
Turnout					
Registered voters					
Source: Elections BC

2017 British Columbia general election: Kootenay East
Party	Candidate	Votes	%	±%	Expenditures
Liberal	Tom Shypitka	9,666	56.57	−6.42	$53,655
New Democratic	Randal Macnair	5,070	29.67	−7.34	$34,336
Green	Yvonne Marie Prest	1,926	11.27	–	$2,412
Libertarian	Keith D. Komar	425	2.49	–	$2,027
Total valid votes		17,087	100.00		
Total rejected ballots		101	0.59		
Turnout		17,188	55.71		
Source: Elections BC
