= Fernie Secondary School =

Highschool

== Information ==
Fernie Secondary School

Location
- 102 Fairway Drive; Fernie, British Columbia, V0B 1M0; Canada; 49.5132°N 115.0527°W

Information
- School type: Public, high school
- Founded: 1908
- School board: School District 5 Southeast Kootenay
- Superintendent: Viveka Johnson
- School number: 505032
- Principal: Jason Sommerfeld
- Staff: 51
- Grades: 7-12
- Enrollment: 548 (2025/2026)
- Language: English, French Immersion
- Colours: Green and White
- Mascot: Falcon
- Team name: Fernie Falcons
- Website: sd5.bc.ca/fss
- Last updated: October 3, 2026

Fernie Secondary School (formed in 1908) is a public high school in the city of Fernie, British Columbia, it is part of the School District 5 Southeast Kootenay. The school holds grades 7 through 12.

The original school building, located in the downtown core of Fernie, was home to the school from 1908, until 1999. In 1999, a new school building was opened on a property adjacent to the Fernie Golf and Country Club. The original building sat abandoned for 8 years before being redeveloped into condominiums. FSS has a population of about 520 students in Grades 7 to 12 and usually hosts a small number of international students at a time.

F.S.S. has one of the largest gymnasiums in the East Kootenays, and now has its own Disc Golf Course available for public use.
