= CHDR-FM =

Radio station in Cranbrook, British Columbia

- Cranbrook, British Columbia; Canada
- Broadcast area: Fernie and Sparwood
- Frequency: 102.9 MHz
- Branding: 102.9 Rewind Radio

Programming
- Format: Classic hits

Ownership
- Owner: Jim Pattison Group
- Sister stations: CHBZ-FM

History
- First air date: October 19, 1957
- Former call signs: CKEK (1957–2002)
- Former frequencies: 570 kHz (1957–2002)
- Call sign meaning: "Drive" (former branding)

Technical information
- Class: C
- ERP: 1,600 watts (horizontal only)
- HAAT: 1,047.7 metres (3,437 ft)
- Transmitter coordinates: 49°27′33.84″N 115°37′48.00″W

Links
- Webcast: Listen Live
- Website: 1029rewindradio.ca

CHDR-FM is a Canadian radio station in Cranbrook, British Columbia that broadcasts a classic hits format at 102.9 FM branded as 102.9 Rewind Radio. The station is owned by the Jim Pattison Group.

== History ==
The station originally began broadcasting on October 19, 1957 as CKEK at a frequency of 570 kHz on the AM dial. The "EK" in the call letters stood for East Kootenay Broadcasting Ltd. (Robert A. Reagh). In the 1960s, the stations' slogan was "The Voice of the Rockies".

On July 24, 1972, EK Radio Ltd. received approval to acquire CKEK and CFEK from East Kootenay Broadcasting Co Ltd.

On July 27, 1973, CKEK was authorized to increase its daytime power from 1,000 to 10,000 watts, its nighttime power would remain at 1,000 watts.

By 1984, CKEK was owned by Columbia Kootenay Broadcasting Co. Ltd.

In 1984, CFEK Fernie received approval to add an AM transmitter at Sparwood on the frequency 1400 AM.

In 1990, CKEK received approval to add two AM transmitters, CFIW 1200 kHz in Canal Flats and CKKI 1460 kHz in Kimberley, with the license for CFIW renewed again in 2004.

In 2000, Monarch Broadcasting Limited (division of Jim Pattison Industries Ltd.) purchased Columbia Kootenay Broadcasting Co. Ltd.

On September 12, 2001, Columbia Kootenay Broadcasting Co. Ltd., a division of Jim Pattison Industries Ltd. Cranbrook, British Columbia received CRTC approval to move CKEK to 102.9 MHz, which moved there in 2002 and became CHDR-FM 102.9 The Drive.

In September 2021, CHDR-FM flipped to classic hits branded as 102.9 Rewind Radio.

It is uncertain when CKKI Kimberley was deleted, although the FM transmitters that went on in 2002 reach Kimberley. Also, it is uncertain if CFIW Canal Flats is currently still in operation, as CFIW was last listed in the 2008 CRTC renewals and is not listed in the 2015 licence renewals (pending approval). As of 2016, CFIW was deleted from the Industry Canada database.

== Rebroadcasters ==
Rebroadcasters of CHDR-FM
City of licence	Identifier	Frequency	Power	Class	CRTC Decision
Fernie	CJDR-FM	99.1 FM	(Horizontal polarization only); 1,600 watts	B	"Conversion of AM radio station CFEK to FM" - Decision CRTC 2001-624
Sparwood	CJDR-FM-1	93.5 FM	(Horizontal polarization only); 240 watts	LP	"Broadcasting Decision CRTC 2004-489"
