= Cranbrook, British Columbia =

City in Canada

Cranbrook
- City
- City of Cranbrook
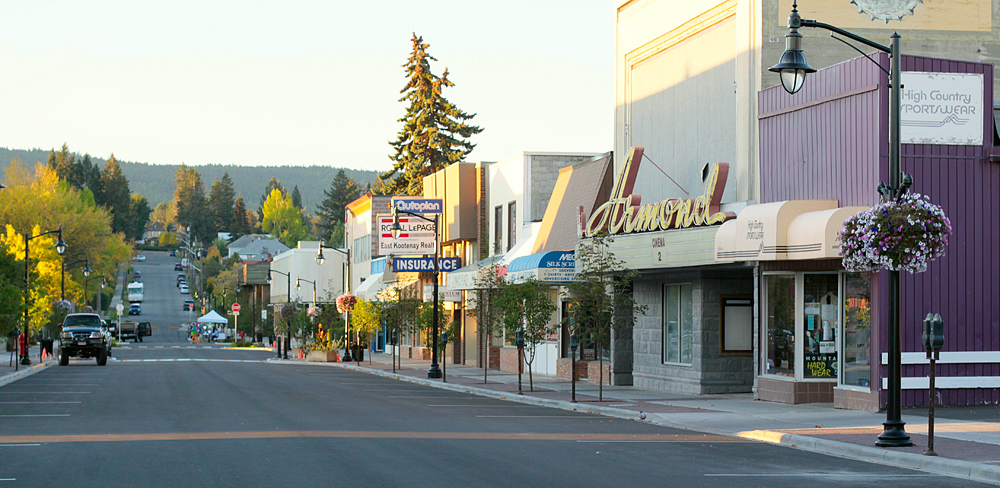
- Downtown Cranbrook

- Flag
- Motto: Mountains of Opportunity
- Location of Cranbrook
- Coordinates: 49°30′29″N 115°44′49″W
- Country: Canada
- Province: British Columbia
- Regional District: East Kootenay
- Established: 1898
- Incorporation: 1905

Government
  - Mayor: Wayne Price
  - Governing body: Cranbrook City Council
  - MP: Rob Morrison
  - MLA: Pete Davis

Area (2021)
  - Land: 31.97 km^{2} (12.34 sq mi)
  - Agglomeration: 4,563.87 km^{2} (1,762.12 sq mi)
  - Population centre: 16.32 km^{2} (6.30 sq mi)
- Elevation: 921 m (3,022 ft)

Population (2021)
  - Total: 20,499
  - Density: 641.2/km^{2} (1,661/sq mi)
  - Agglomeration: 27,040
  - Agglomeration density: 5.9/km^{2} (15/sq mi)
  - Population centre: 20,008
  - Population centre density: 1,225.8/km^{2} (3,175/sq mi)
- Demonym(s): Cranbrookite, Cranbrookian
- Time zone: UTC−06:00 (CST)
- Forward sortation area: V1C
- Area codes: 250, 778, 236, 672
- NTS Map: 82G5 Moyie Lake
- GNBC Code: JAIQY
- Website: cranbrook.ca

Cranbrook (/ˈkrænbrʊk/ KRAN-bruuk) is a city in southeast British Columbia, Canada, located approximately 10 km (6.2 mi) southwest of the confluence of the Kootenay River and the St. Mary's River. It is the largest urban centre in the region known as the East Kootenay. As of 2021, Cranbrook's population is 20,499 with a census agglomeration population of 27,040. It is the location of the headquarters of the Regional District of East Kootenay and also the location of the regional headquarters of various provincial ministries and agencies, notably the Rocky Mountain Forest District.

Cranbrook is home to the Canadian Museum of Rail Travel which presents static exhibits of passenger rail cars built in the 1920s for the CPR and in the 1900s for the Spokane International Railway.

== History ==
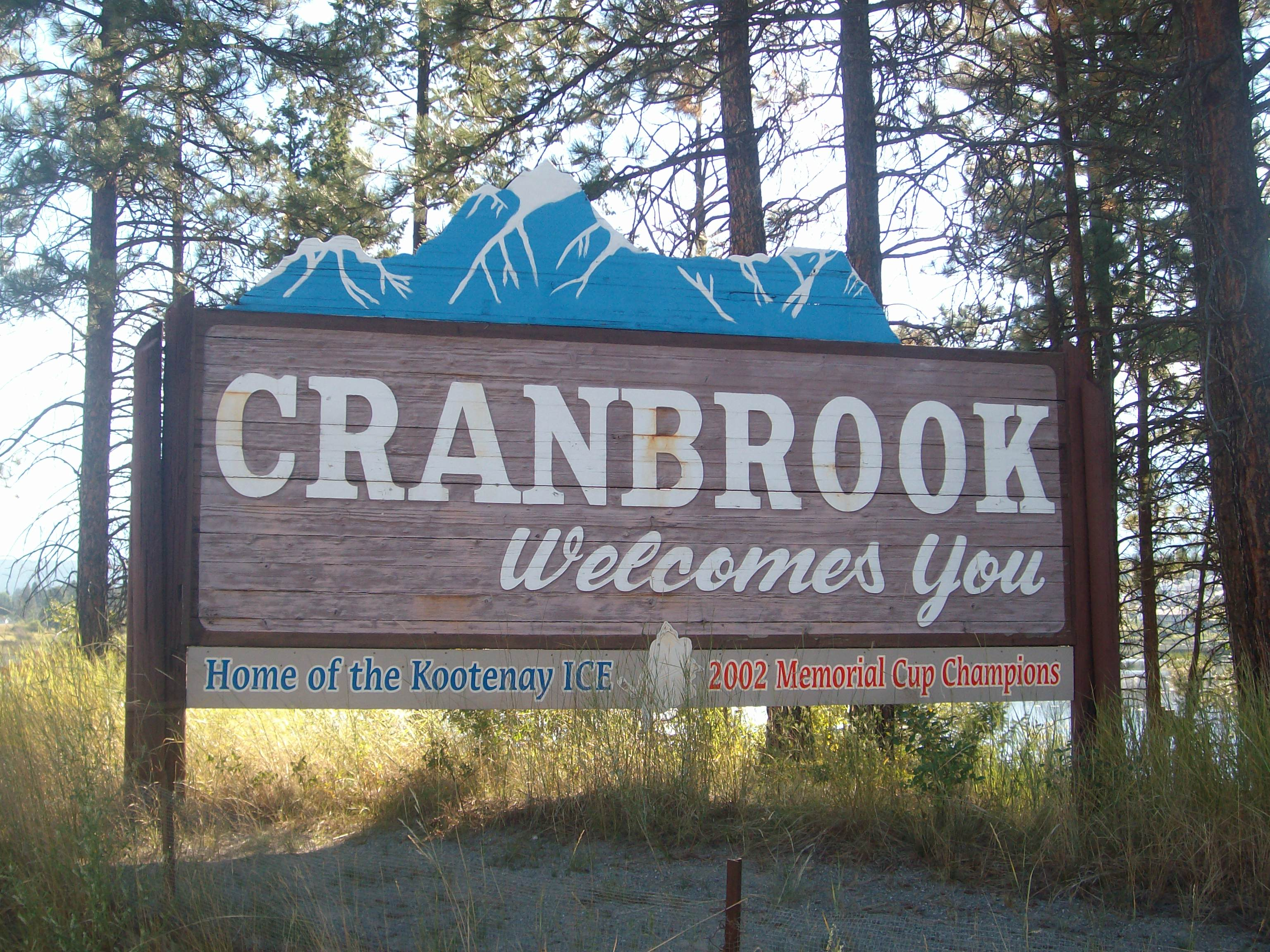
Cranbrook's welcome sign

Originally inhabited by Ktunaxa peoples, the land that Cranbrook now occupies was bought by European settlers, notably Colonel James Baker who named his newly acquired land Cranbrook after his home in Cranbrook, Kent, England. In 1890, the Kootenay Indian Residential School, also called St. Eugene's, opened in Cranbrook, and operated until 1975.

In 1898, Baker had successfully convinced Canadian Pacific Railway to establish their Crowsnest Pass line through Cranbrook rather than nearby Gold Rush Boom Town Fort Steele. With that accomplishment Cranbrook became the major centre of the region, while Fort Steele declined; however, the latter is today a preserved heritage town.

On November 1, 1905, Cranbrook was incorporated as a city.

Some of the major industries include mining and forestry services, trades, and health care.

== Geography ==
While much of the city is relatively flat, Cranbrook is surrounded by many rising hills where many residential homes are located. Cranbrook faces the Purcell Mountains to the west and the Rocky Mountains to the north and east. There are many lakes in close proximity to Cranbrook. Some of these lakes include Jim Smith Lake, Wasa Lake, Lazy Lake, Moyie Lake, Monroe Lake, Norbury Lake and Elizabeth Lake. Many of these lakes contain opportunities for boating, fishing and camping. There are public recreational beaches and provincial campgrounds.

Cranbrook is the largest city in British Columbia to observe Central Time (UTC−06:00) year-round.

=== Climate ===
Cranbrook features a humid continental climate (Dfb) under the Köppen climate classification with very warm, sunny summer days followed by cool nights, and moderately cold and snowy winters. Environment and Climate Change Canada reports Cranbrook as having the most sunshine hours of any British Columbia city at approximately 2190.5 hours annually. It is a fairly dry city throughout the year, and when precipitation does fall a good percentage of it will be in the form of snow. Environment and Climate Change Canada also states that the city experiences some of the lightest wind speeds year-round, has few foggy days, and has among the highest average barometric pressure of any city in Canada. Frost-free days average 127 days, typically occurring between May 18 to September 23. Mean daily temperatures range from −6.5 °C (20.3 °F) to 19.2 °C (66.6 °F). However, temperatures can range from −20 °C (−4 °F) in the winter to 35 °C (95 °F) in the summer months. Overall, its climate is extremely similar to that of Kelowna, in the nearby Okanagan Valley to the west - especially in regard to precipitation patterns and total monthly accumulation. However, Kelowna is significantly warmer throughout all seasons.

The mean temperature is 6.1 °C (43.0 °F) and the highest temperature ever recorded in Cranbrook was 40.5 °C (104.9 °F) on August 10, 2018. The coldest temperature ever recorded was −41.1 °C (−42.0 °F) on January 19, 1950.

Climate data for Cranbrook (Cranbrook/Canadian Rockies International Airport) WMO ID: 71880; coordinates 49°36′44″N 115°46′55″W; elevation: 940.0 m (3,084.0 ft); 1991–2020 normals (sun 1981–2010), , extremes 1901–present (Note: Climate data was recorded at Cranbrook from January 1901 to March 1939 and at Cranbrook Airport from February 1938 to present.)
Month	Jan	Feb	Mar	Apr	May	Jun	Jul	Aug	Sep	Oct	Nov	Dec	Year
Record high humidex	13.5	13.4	22.0	27.8	35.1	36.5	38.0	39.9	34.4	28.6	19.5	11.7	39.9
Record high °C (°F)	13.9 (57.0)	13.5 (56.3)	22.4 (72.3)	28.0 (82.4)	34.2 (93.6)	40.1 (104.2)	36.7 (98.1)	40.5 (104.9)	34.9 (94.8)	29.2 (84.6)	19.5 (67.1)	12.2 (54.0)	40.4 (104.7)
Mean daily maximum °C (°F)	−1.9 (28.6)	1.6 (34.9)	7.3 (45.1)	12.8 (55.0)	18.3 (64.9)	21.5 (70.7)	26.9 (80.4)	26.6 (79.9)	20.4 (68.7)	11.4 (52.5)	2.7 (36.9)	−2.8 (27.0)	12.1 (53.8)
Daily mean °C (°F)	−6.1 (21.0)	−3.5 (25.7)	1.8 (35.2)	6.4 (43.5)	11.5 (52.7)	14.9 (58.8)	19.2 (66.6)	18.6 (65.5)	13.1 (55.6)	5.6 (42.1)	−1.3 (29.7)	−6.5 (20.3)	6.1 (43.0)
Mean daily minimum °C (°F)	−10.1 (13.8)	−8.6 (16.5)	−3.8 (25.2)	0.0 (32.0)	4.7 (40.5)	8.2 (46.8)	11.3 (52.3)	10.4 (50.7)	5.7 (42.3)	−0.3 (31.5)	−5.3 (22.5)	−10.1 (13.8)	0.2 (32.4)
Record low °C (°F)	−41.1 (−42.0)	−31.8 (−25.2)	−28.3 (−18.9)	−15.6 (3.9)	−6.1 (21.0)	−1.3 (29.7)	1.0 (33.8)	−1.3 (29.7)	−6.9 (19.6)	−18.5 (−1.3)	−31.8 (−25.2)	−40.0 (−40.0)	−40.0 (−40.0)
Record low wind chill	−43.2	−39.1	−37.2	−19.7	−8.9	−5.0	0.0	−2.9	−9.4	−22.6	−37.4	−46.8	−46.8
Average precipitation mm (inches)	26.7 (1.05)	19.9 (0.78)	26.5 (1.04)	23.2 (0.91)	42.0 (1.65)	62.2 (2.45)	35.4 (1.39)	24.0 (0.94)	30.1 (1.19)	26.1 (1.03)	34.8 (1.37)	34.8 (1.37)	385.5 (15.18)
Average rainfall mm (inches)	4.8 (0.19)	3.4 (0.13)	11.9 (0.47)	17.7 (0.70)	41.1 (1.62)	66.4 (2.61)	38.1 (1.50)	25.4 (1.00)	30.9 (1.22)	18.7 (0.74)	13.8 (0.54)	6.6 (0.26)	278.9 (10.98)
Average snowfall cm (inches)	27.8 (10.9)	17.4 (6.9)	15.5 (6.1)	6.4 (2.5)	1.4 (0.6)	0.0 (0.0)	0.0 (0.0)	0.0 (0.0)	0.0 (0.0)	5.8 (2.3)	23.9 (9.4)	34.6 (13.6)	132.6 (52.2)
Average precipitation days (≥ 0.2 mm)	12.3	9.1	10.0	9.2	11.0	13.4	8.6	7.2	8.0	9.6	12.3	12.9	123.5
Average rainy days (≥ 0.2 mm)	3.0	2.3	5.3	7.4	10.9	13.7	8.8	7.7	8.0	8.0	5.4	2.5	82.9
Average snowy days (≥ 0.2 cm)	10.9	7.6	6.4	3.0	0.7	0.0	0.0	0.0	0.0	1.8	7.8	12.1	50.2
Average relative humidity (%) (at 1500 LST)	71.9	58.5	48.7	41.0	40.2	42.6	33.7	32.2	39.7	50.7	67.8	75.2	50.2
Mean monthly sunshine hours	63.5	106.9	163.2	215.0	256.7	267.8	315.1	302.7	218.2	159.5	69.8	51.9	2,190.5
Percentage possible sunshine	23.7	37.5	44.4	52.2	54.0	55.0	64.2	67.7	57.5	47.6	25.5	20.4	45.8
Source: Environment and Climate Change Canada (sun 1981–2010) (January minimum) {June maximum) (August maximum)

== Demographics ==
Federal census population history
Year	Pop.	±%
1951	3,621	—
1956	4,562	+26.0%
1961	5,549	+21.6%
1966	7,849	+41.4%
1971	12,011	+53.0%
1976	13,510	+12.5%
1981	15,915	+17.8%
1986	15,971	+0.4%
1991	16,447	+3.0%
1996	18,329	+11.4%
2001	18,476	+0.8%
2006	18,267	−1.1%
2011	19,319	+5.8%
2016	20,047	+3.8%
2021	20,499	+2.3%
Source: Statistics Canada

In the 2021 Canadian census conducted by Statistics Canada, Cranbrook had a population of 20,499 living in 8,780 of its 9,058 total private dwellings, a change of 2.3% from its 2016 population of 20,047. With a land area of 31.97 km^{2} (12.34 sq mi), it had a population density of 641.2/km^{2} (1,660.7/sq mi) in 2021.

=== Ethnicity ===
Panethnic groups in the City of Cranbrook (2001−2021)
Panethnic group	2021		2016		2011		2006		2001	
Panethnic group	Pop.	%	Pop.	%	Pop.	%	Pop.	%	Pop.	%
European (Note: Statistic includes all persons that did not make up part of a visible minority or an indigenous identity.)	16,500	83.14%	16,845	86.12%	17,030	90.44%	16,555	92.23%	16,655	91.14%
Indigenous	1,965	9.9%	1,710	8.74%	1,310	6.96%	1,090	6.07%	1,115	6.1%
Southeast Asian (Note: Statistic includes total responses of "Filipino" and "Southeast Asian" under visible minority section on census.)	385	1.94%	185	0.95%	65	0.35%	30	0.17%	85	0.47%
South Asian	365	1.84%	155	0.79%	80	0.42%	20	0.11%	75	0.41%
East Asian (Note: Statistic includes total responses of "Chinese", "Korean", and "Japanese" under visible minority section on census.)	325	1.64%	375	1.92%	185	0.98%	190	1.06%	220	1.2%
African	190	0.96%	115	0.59%	80	0.42%	30	0.17%	65	0.36%
Latin American	70	0.35%	45	0.23%	40	0.21%	10	0.06%	25	0.14%
Middle Eastern (Note: Statistic includes total responses of "West Asian" and "Arab" under visible minority section on census.)	15	0.08%	45	0.23%	0	0%	10	0.06%	0	0%
Other/multiracial (Note: Statistic includes total responses of "Visible minority, n.i.e." and "Multiple visible minorities" under visible minority section on census.)	25	0.13%	70	0.36%	0	0%	0	0%	25	0.14%
Total responses	19,845	96.81%	19,560	97.57%	18,830	97.47%	17,950	98.26%	18,275	98.91%
Total population	20,499	100%	20,047	100%	19,319	100%	18,267	100%	18,476	100%
Note: Totals greater than 100% due to multiple origin responses.

=== Religion ===
According to the 2021 census, religious groups in Cranbrook included:

- Irreligion (11,190 persons or 56.4%)
- Christianity (8,060 persons or 40.6%)
- Sikhism (155 persons or 0.8%)
- Hinduism (120 persons or 0.6%)
- Buddhism (85 persons or 0.4%)
- Islam (45 persons or 0.2%)
- Indigenous Spirituality (25 persons or 0.1%)
- Judaism (15 persons or 0.1%)

== Education ==
=== Schools ===
Public schools are run by School District 5 Southeast Kootenay, consisting of six elementary schools and two middle schools that feed into the city's only high school: Mount Baker Secondary School, home to approximately 1,000 students and 90 staff members. Mount Baker is the largest high school in school district five. Prior to 2004, the middle schools were referred to as junior high schools housing grades 8-10 rather than the current 7–9. However, due to declining enrollment, the school district adopted the new system. There is also a local home-school network.

The following 12 schools are located in Cranbrook.

- Aqamnik Elementary School (First Nations school located in St. Mary's Band
- Gordon Terrace Elementary
- Highlands Elementary School
- Kootenay Christian Academy
- Kootenay Orchards Elementary School
- Laurie Middle School
- Mount Baker Secondary School
- Parkland Middle School
- Pinewood Elementary School
- St. Mary's Catholic Independent School (private school)
- Steeples Elementary School
- T M Roberts Elementary School

=== Post-secondary education ===
Cranbrook is home to the main campus of the College of the Rockies, which has over 2,500 full and part-time students from over 21 countries.

== Transportation ==
Cranbrook is at the junction of major highways BC 3 and 93/95, and due to its close proximity to the borders of Alberta and the United States, it is an important transportation hub. Cranbrook has a major Canadian Pacific Railway yard, which serves as a key gateway for trains arriving from and departing to the United States.

The McPhee Bridge also known as the St. Mary's Bridge rises high above the St. Mary River and is near the Cranbrook/Canadian Rockies International Airport and the Shadow Mountain Golf Community. It supports the thousands of people who travel between Kimberley and Cranbrook on highway 95A.

Approximately 5 nautical miles (9.3 km; 5.8 mi) north is the Cranbrook/Canadian Rockies International Airport, which has recently completed its 12.5 million dollar expansion including the lengthening of its runway from 6,000 to 8,000 ft (1,800 to 2,400 m) feet in order to accommodate a limited number of international flights and an expansion to the Terminal for more passengers. The airport is served by Air Canada Jazz to Vancouver, and WestJet Encore to Vancouver and Calgary.

On February 11, 1978, Pacific Western Airlines Flight 314, a Boeing 737-200, nearly impacted a snowplow on the runway at the airport in Cranbrook, then lost control and crashed, killing 42 of the 49 people on board.

Cranbrook has a public transit system operated by BC Transit, which runs buses on eight different lines.

== Health care ==
Cranbrook has the largest hospital in the region, the East Kootenay Regional Hospital.

== Sports and recreation ==
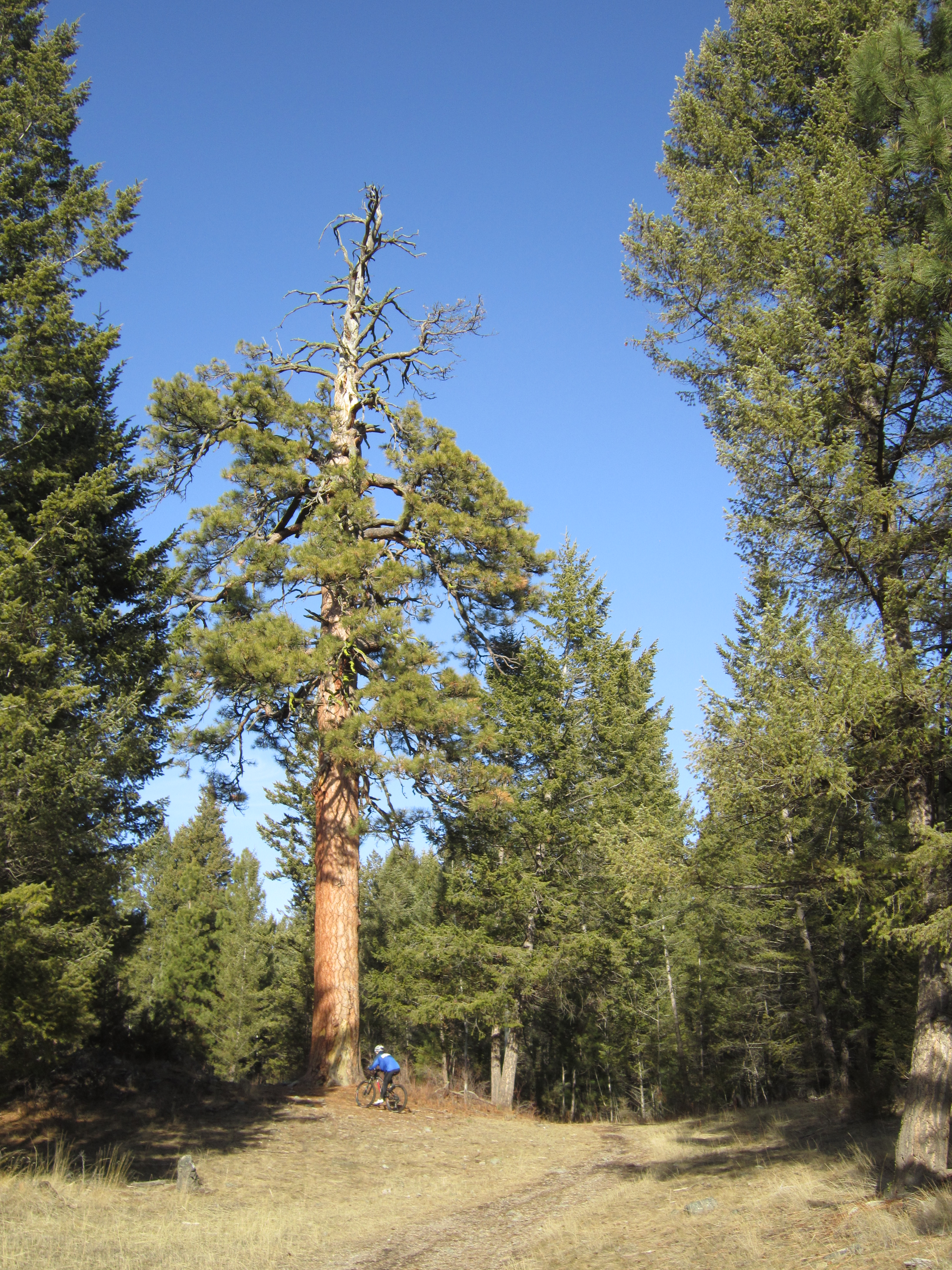
"Big tree" mountain bike trail located on private land behind the Community Forest

Western Financial Place (formerly called the RecPlex) is a pool and hockey arena in Cranbrook that opened in 2000, and was formerly the home to the Kootenay Ice until relocating to Winnipeg, Manitoba, in 2019. Following their departure, the recreational centre became home to the Cranbrook Bucks who play in the BCHL. A paved, two-lane 28 km (17 mi) trail exists between Cranbrook and Kimberley, BC. This trail constitutes a section of the Trans-Canada Trail and is known as the Rails to Trails. Canadian Pacific Railway donated the rail right-of-way and the teardown of the railway began by CP Rail in 2009. In addition to this trail, there are 2000 acres of wilderness to explore in the community forest.

== Media ==
Newspapers

- Cranbrook Daily Townsman - Daily paper

Radio stations

- 101.3 FM - CBRR-FM, CBC Radio One (repeats CBTK-FM, Kelowna)
- 102.9 FM - CHDR-FM, 102.9 REWIND RADIO
- 104.7 FM - CHBZ-FM, Wild 104.7, Country
- 107.5 FM - CFSM-FM, 107.5 2day FM, Adult Contemporary

Television

- Channel 5: (Air) Channel 4: (Cable) CFCN-TV-9, CTV (analogue repeater of CFCN-DT Calgary)
- Shaw TV (community cable channel)

== Notable people ==
The following notable people come from or were born in Cranbrook:

- Ray Allison, retired NHL player
- Greg Andrusak, retired NHL player
- Andrew Boden, writer
- Bowen Byram, NHL player
- Brent Carver, actor
- Glen Cochrane, retired NHL player
- Tanya Fir, Member of the Alberta Leglislature, 2019-
- James Heilman, doctor
- Jim Hiller, NHL head coach, retired NHL player
- Dryden Hunt, NHL player
- Juggernaut, retired professional wrestler
- Jon Klemm, retired NHL player
- Jean Lee (aircraftwoman), only woman of Chinese-Canadian descent to serve in Royal Canadian Air Force Women's Division
- Lillix, former pop rock band
- Bernie Lukowich, retired NHL player
- Brad Lukowich, retired NHL player
- Donald C. MacDonald, politician
- Jason Marshall, retired NHL player
- Bob McAneeley, former WHA player
- Ted McAneeley, retired NHL and WHA player
- Evah McKowan, novelist
- Bob Murdoch and Don Murdoch, retired NHL players
- Riley Nelson, retired ECHL player and captain for the Colorado Eagles
- Rob Niedermayer, retired NHL player
- Scott Niedermayer, retired NHL player
- Kate Pullinger, author
- Tom Renney, former NHL and Olympic ice hockey coach
- Ben Rutledge, Olympic gold medal rower
- Joel Savage, retired NHL player
- Terry Segarty, businessman and BC Minister of Labour
- Jonathan Shewchuk, computer science professor
- Tom Shypitka, three-time provincial curling champion (1979, 1991, 2010)
- Corey Spring, retired NHL player
- Frank Spring, retired NHL player
- Steve Yzerman, retired NHL player and former general manager for the Detroit Red Wings

== Sister cities ==
Cranbrook is twinned with

- Coeur d'Alene, Idaho (United States)
