= Baynes Lake =

- Location of Baynes Lake in British Columbia
- Coordinates: 49°13′59″N 115°13′03″W
- Country: Canada
- Province: British Columbia
- Region: East Kootenay
- Regional district: East Kootenay
- Area codes: 250, 778, 236, & 672

Baynes Lake is an unincorporated rural community on the east shore of Lake Koocanusa, just north of the mouth of the Elk River, in the East Kootenay region of southeastern British Columbia. Off BC Highway 93, the locality is by road about 65 kilometres (40 mi) southEAST of Cranbrook and 44 kilometres (27 mi) southWEST of Fernie.

== Name origin ==
In 1896, Andrew Bain preempted land on the shores of what became known as Baynes Lake, the name later being adopted by the community.

== Railways ==
In September 1902, the rail head of the Great Northern Railway (GN) advanced northward through the locality. The Baynes station, which opened in 1904, included a water tank. The stop was 9.2 kilometres (5.7 mi) north of Krag and 12.1 kilometres (7.5 mi) south of Mott. Passenger service was not available before 1905 or possibly 1906, when Baynes became a flag stop. By 1907, it was a regular stop, for years, the only one between Fernie, BC, and Rexford, Montana. The station served as late as 1935, but had closed by 1936 with the abandonment of the Elko–Rexford section of track that year.

In 1912, the Canadian Pacific Railway (CP) built its Waldo subdivision southward from Caithness, crossing the GN track just south of the station. CP abandoned the route in 1928.

== Early community ==
Mrs Jessie Dilse was the inaugural postmaster 1904–1905. Job opportunities at the Adolph Lumber Company, which established a sawmill site along the eastern shore around 1907, drew many settlers to the locality. The company operated two stores. The meeting hall above one of them hosted a church, dances, school concerts, twice monthly silent movies, and other community events. Both railways served the mill. In 1909, Jennie Adolph became the inaugural school teacher.

When the mill closed in the early 1920s, the population quickly dwindled and workers moved to find employment elsewhere. Many of the remaining residents were farmers or worked in the new portable mills of the area. The post office closed in 1968.

== Reservoir ==
When the reservoir for the Libby Dam in Montana, submerged parts of the Kootenay River valley in the early 1970s, several displaced families were relocated to small building lots in Baynes Lake. The historic Waldo church building was similarly relocated about 5 kilometres (3 mi) at this time.

== Later community ==
Nowadays, many of the approximately 160 dwellings are occupied only seasonally. The village includes a community hall, church, volunteer fire hall, general store, and community park.

Baynes Lake is the home of the oldest Farmers' Market in the East Kootenays. The Jaffray-Baynes Lake Farmers' Market, is held every Saturday from 9:00 am to 12:30 pm from the middle of June through Labour Day weekend, at the Community Hall.

== Climate ==
Climate data for Baynes Lake (1981-2010)
Month	Jan	Feb	Mar	Apr	May	Jun	Jul	Aug	Sep	Oct	Nov	Dec	Year
Record high °C (°F)	11.5 (52.7)	17.0 (62.6)	24.0 (75.2)	29.5 (85.1)	33.5 (92.3)	35.5 (95.9)	38.5 (101.3)	37.0 (98.6)	35.0 (95.0)	26.5 (79.7)	17.5 (63.5)	12.5 (54.5)	38.5 (101.3)
Mean daily maximum °C (°F)	−1.2 (29.8)	2.5 (36.5)	8.3 (46.9)	14.3 (57.7)	18.9 (66.0)	22.7 (72.9)	27.2 (81.0)	27.3 (81.1)	21.6 (70.9)	12.9 (55.2)	4.0 (39.2)	−1.6 (29.1)	13.1 (55.6)
Daily mean °C (°F)	−5.6 (21.9)	−3.2 (26.2)	1.9 (35.4)	6.8 (44.2)	11.3 (52.3)	15.1 (59.2)	18.3 (64.9)	17.9 (64.2)	12.8 (55.0)	6.0 (42.8)	−0.1 (31.8)	−5.0 (23.0)	6.3 (43.3)
Mean daily minimum °C (°F)	−9.9 (14.2)	−8.8 (16.2)	−4.5 (23.9)	−0.7 (30.7)	3.5 (38.3)	7.4 (45.3)	9.3 (48.7)	8.3 (46.9)	3.9 (39.0)	−1.0 (30.2)	−4.2 (24.4)	−8.4 (16.9)	−0.4 (31.3)
Record low °C (°F)	−39.0 (−38.2)	−34.5 (−30.1)	−26.5 (−15.7)	−11.5 (11.3)	−6.0 (21.2)	−4.5 (23.9)	0.5 (32.9)	−3.5 (25.7)	−10.0 (14.0)	−20.5 (−4.9)	−31.0 (−23.8)	−40.5 (−40.9)	−40.5 (−40.9)
Average precipitation mm (inches)	38.7 (1.52)	22.8 (0.90)	28.7 (1.13)	29.5 (1.16)	55.5 (2.19)	64.4 (2.54)	43.3 (1.70)	28.7 (1.13)	33.0 (1.30)	25.4 (1.00)	42.2 (1.66)	42.1 (1.66)	454.6 (17.90)
Average precipitation days (≥ 0.2 mm)	11.1	6.8	9.5	10.2	13.5	13.7	9.3	7.3	8.2	9.0	11.8	10.2	120.5
Average rainy days (≥ 0.2 mm)	3.5	2.8	7.3	9.9	13.5	13.7	9.3	7.3	8.2	8.9	8.7	3.3	96.3
Average snowy days (≥ 2 mm)	8.6	4.8	3.1	0.86	0.19	0.0	0.0	0.0	0.0	0.35	3.8	7.6	29.2
Source: Environment Canada
