= Fernie =

Fernie is a Scottish surname. Fernie can refer to:

== Places ==
- Fernie, British Columbia, a city in British Columbia, Canada
- Mount Fernie, a mountain in the Canadian Rockies of British Columbia, Canada
  - Mount Fernie Provincial Park, a park on Mount Fernie
- Fernie Alpine Resort, a ski resort in the Canadian Rockies of British Columbia, Canada
- Fernie (electoral district), a provincial electoral district in British Columbia, Canada
- Fernie Castle, a sixteenth-century tower house in north-east Fife, Scotland

== People ==
- Fernie Flaman, a Canadian professional ice hockey player
- Duncan Fernie (b. 1978), a Scottish curler
- Jim Fernie (b. 1936), a Scottish footballer
- Willie Fernie (golfer), a Scottish golfer
- Willie Fernie (footballer), a Scottish footballer

== See also ==
- Fernando
