= Waldo, British Columbia =

Ghost town in British Columbia, Canada

Waldo
- Location of Waldo in British Columbia
- Coordinates: 49°11′59″N 115°13′03″W
- Country: Canada
- Province: British Columbia
- Region: East Kootenay
- Regional district: East Kootenay

Waldo is a ghost town in the East Kootenay region of southeastern British Columbia. About 2 kilometres (1.2 mi) north of Krag (another ghost town), the remnants are submerged beside the east shore of Lake Koocanusa, just north of the mouth of the Elk River. Off BC Highway 93, the site is by road about 69 kilometres (43 mi) southwest of Cranbrook and 48 kilometres (30 mi) southeast of Fernie.

== Name origin ==
Formerly called Crow's Nest Landing, the town began in the 1890s as a refuelling point for the wood-burning steamboats travelling the Kootenay River. At the time, William Waldorf Waldo, a real estate speculator, acquired extensive land for subdivision. Upper Waldo was the main settlement and Lower Waldo was downstream.

== Railways ==
In September 1902, the rail head of the Great Northern Railway (GN) advanced northward through the locality. Waldo was the main lumber town on this GN route.

The flag stop, which opened around 1911, was 7.7 kilometres (4.8 mi) north of Dorr and 10.0 kilometres (6.2 mi) south of Baynes. Around 1924, the station moved about 2.3 kilometres (1.4 mi) northward and served as late as 1935, but had closed by 1936 with the abandonment of the Elko, BC–Rexford, Montana section of track that year.

In 1912, the Canadian Pacific Railway (CP) built its Waldo subdivision southward from Caithness, crossing the GN track about 9.2 kilometres (5.7 mi) north of the station. CP abandoned the route in 1928.

== Lumber ==
In 1905, the Ross brothers built a sawmill at the mouth of the Elk River. The next year, they partnered with a Saskatchewan-based lumber dealer named Telford to form Ross-Saskatoon Lumber. Selling the mill to Malcolm and Hugh H. McInnes, the brothers built a new mill adjacent to Lower Waldo. Encountering an acute labour shortage, the manager sent an agent east to hire experienced French-Canadian mill workers. Ross-Saskatoon mostly logged on the western side of the Kootenay River. The company acquired two Shay locomotives and laid 1,067 mm (3 ft 6 in) narrow-gauge railway trackage to transport logs to the mouth of Englishman Creek, from where the log rafts were towed to the mill. The mill closed in 1923. Finding no buyers, the Shays were cut up for scrap at Waldo in 1927.

In 1907, Baker-McNab Lumber Co. built a mill in Upper Waldo. The company logged on the eastern side of river. In 1929, when a fire started near this mill, the company chose not to rebuild. The combined capacity of the two mills (each 75,000 feet per day) had exceeded the available forest resources, making their operations unprofitable.

== Community ==
J. M. Agnew was the inaugural postmaster 1906–1908. At Lower Waldo were a boarding house and pool hall. In later years, a schoolhouse, general store, barbershop, leather repairer, and garage existed. The 1929 fire destroyed almost the entire town, leaving only the Anglican church and a few buildings in South Waldo. The town was largely rebuilt. With the end of the lumber industry, the community struggled, relying upon agriculture. The success of ranching during the Great Depression led to the formation of the Waldo Stock Breeders Livestock Association. By the mid-1950s, the village comprised two small stores, a school, a dilapidated hotel, and many empty houses. The post office closed in 1967.

== Reservoir ==
The reservoir for the Libby Dam in Montana submerged the site in the early 1970s. Prior to the flooding, the historic church building was relocated to Baynes Lake. BC Hydro set fire to almost all the remaining buildings, including the once magnificent three-room school. Resting upon concrete piers, the 1920s-era bridge spanning the Kootenay was dynamited.

== Ferry and bridges ==
In 1896, Capt. Tom Flowers installed a cable ferry across the Elk River, near the mouth. Although a ford existed on the old Kalispell Trail near Mott's road house, trail users had to use the ferry during high water. The next year, a flood briefly took out the ferry. In 1898, the ferry broke away while transporting six men and two horse teams. Carried nearly to Tobacco Plains, the ferry landed on a small island 11 kilometres (7 mi) downriver.

By 1910, a rickety suspension bridge spanned the Kootenay River at Waldo. Each spring, the planks were removed to avoid being swept away by floods. Around 1923, a Howe truss was built to carry the logging rail line across the river. This bridge also allowed vehicular access to towns westward via rudimentary logging trails.
