= Coal Creek =

Coal Creek may refer to:

== Australia ==
- Coal Creek, Queensland, a locality in the Somerset Region
- Coal Creek, Victoria, a town

== Canada ==
- Coal Creek (British Columbia), a creek
- Coal Creek, British Columbia, a ghost town

== United States ==
=== Populated places ===
- Coal Creek, Colorado, a town in Fremont County, Colorado.
- Coal Creek, Jefferson County, Colorado, a census-designated place in Jefferson, Boulder, and Clear Creek counties, Colorado.
- Coal Creek, Indiana, an unincorporated community.
- Coal Creek Station, a power plant in North Dakota.
- Rocky Top, Tennessee, originally named Coal Creek.
- Coal Creek, Washington, an unincorporated community.
- Coal Creek Historic Mining District, in Coal Creek, Alaska.
- Coal Creek Township, Montgomery County, Indiana

=== Rivers and streams ===
- Coal Creek (Henry County, Missouri), creek in Missouri
- Coal Creek (Susquehanna River), creek in Pennsylvania
- Mahanoy Creek, known locally as Coal Creek, Pennsylvania
- Coal Creek (Clinch River tributary), a tributary stream of the Clinch River in Tennessee
- Coal Creek (Iron County, Utah) a stream in Cedar Valley, Utah
- Coal Creek (Washington), a creek in Bellevue, Washington

== Geology ==
- Coal Creek Serpentinite (Texas geology), a piece of Precambrian oceanic crust exposed in central, Texas

== Other ==
- Coal Creek (novel), a 2013 novel by Alex Miller
