= Hosmer =

Hosmer may refer to:

== People ==
- Hosmer (surname)

== Places ==
- Hosmer, South Dakota, United States
- Hosmer's Grove, Maui, Hawaii, United States
- Mount Hosmer (disambiguation)
- Hosmer, British Columbia, Canada

== Other uses ==
- Charles Hosmer Morse Museum of American Art, a museum in Orange County, Florida
- Hosmer Mountain Soda, a soft-drink producer based in Connecticut
- Hosmer Angel, a fictional character in a Sherlock Holmes story by Sir Arthur Conan Doyle
