= Roosville =

Roosville is a locality on the Canada-US border between Montana and British Columbia. It may refer to:

- Roosville, British Columbia
- Roosville, Montana
