= Lizard Creek (Elk River tributary) =

Coordinates: 49°28′13″N 115°4′27″W

Lizard Creek is a tributary of the Elk River. Their confluence is south of the city of Fernie, British Columbia near the base of Fernie Alpine Resort. Lizard Creek drains a side valley of the Elk Valley called Cedar Valley, which is home to Island Lake Lodge.

== See also ==
- List of rivers of British Columbia
