= Elk Valley Provincial Park =

Provincial park in British Columbia

- IUCN category II (national park)
- Location within British Columbia
- Interactive map of Elk Valley Provincial Park
- Location: Kootenay Land District, British Columbia, Canada
- Nearest city: Fernie, BC
- Coordinates: 49°37′24″N 114°56′16″W
- Area: 81 ha (200 acres)
- Established: November 8, 1960
- Governing body: BC Parks

Elk Valley Provincial Park is a provincial park in British Columbia, Canada. It covers an area of 81 hectares and is located about 18 kilometres north of Fernie. It is not identified by any formal provincial park signage; rather it is signed by the Ministry of Transportation as the "Olson Rest Area".

== Mining ==
Elk Valley Provincial Park is very close to Elk Valley (British Columbia), which has metallurgical coal.
