= Eureka–Roosville Border Crossing =

Border crossing between Canada and the United States

Roosville Border Crossing
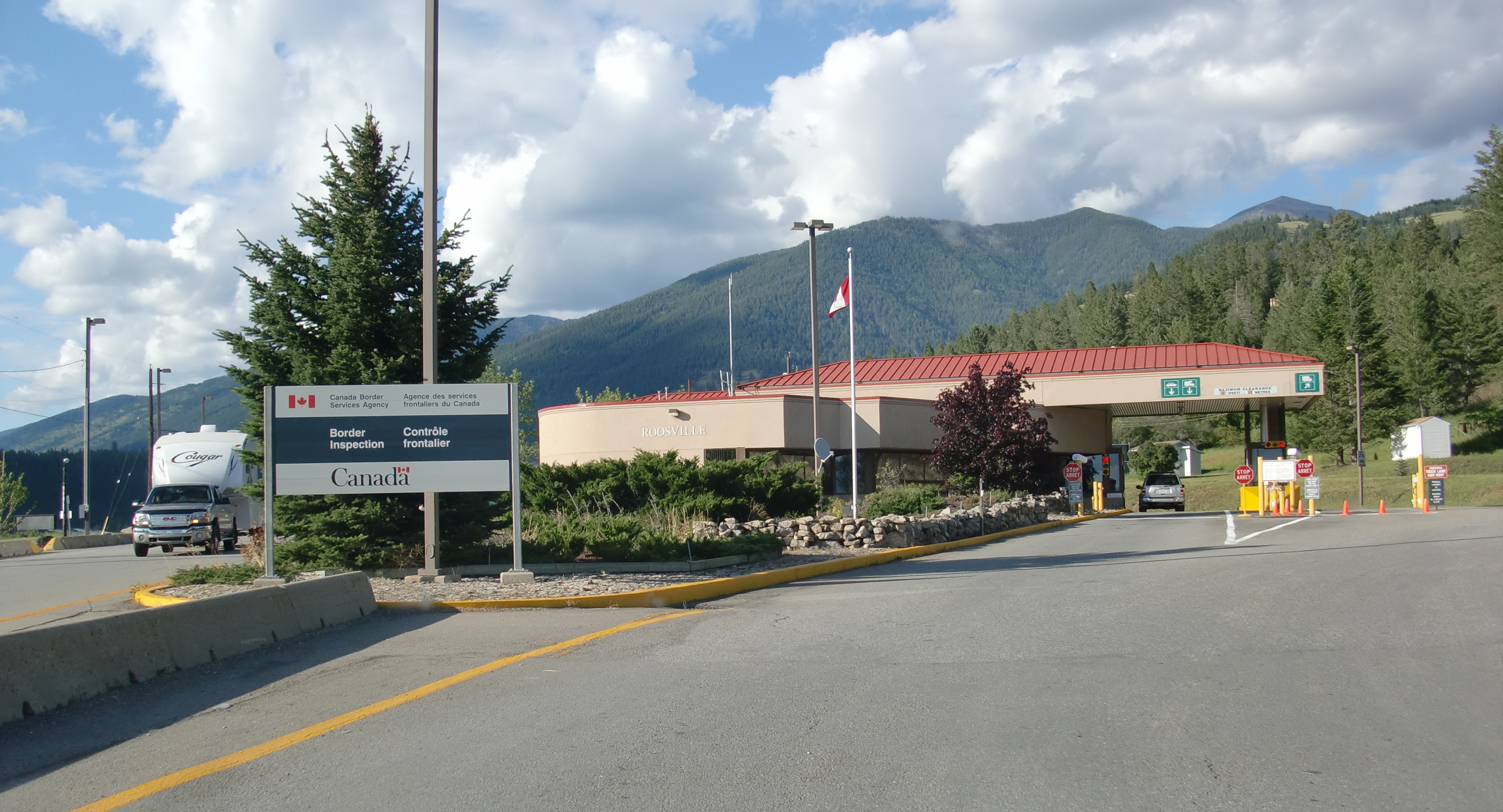
- Canada Border Inspection Station at Roosville, British Columbia

Locaiton
- Country: United States; Canada
- Location: US 93 / Highway 93; US Port: 7915 Hwy 93 North, Eureka, Montana 59917-9331; Canadian Port: Highway 93 South, Grasmere, British Columbia V0B 1R0
- Coordinates: 48°59′59″N 115°03′21″W

Details
- Opened: 1897

Website
- Roosville

The Roosville Border Crossing connects the town of Eureka, Montana, with Grasmere, British Columbia, on the Canada–US border. U.S. Route 93 on the American side joins British Columbia Highway 93 on the Canadian side. Both the US and Canada border stations share the same name. The crossing is the easternmost in British Columbia, and the westernmost in Montana; it is the only active border crossing between the province and state.

== Canadian side ==
As early as 1874, a customs officer patrolled the boundary from the Kootenay River eastward to the Alberta border. In 1896, an officer was covering from Crow's Nest Landing to Roosville (then called Phillips). At various times, the former post relocated up and down the river. In 1897, the station became permanently based at Phillips. In 1902, the office moved to Gateway (on the east bank of the Kootenay at the border) a few months before the track of the Great Northern Railway (GN) advanced northward through the location. Initially, the Canadian customs house was immediately south of the border, before the building was moved a quarter mile by flatcar into Canada.

Around 1910, the Newgate–Gateway cable ferry was installed across the river. About 1912, the Newgate–Lynn's Island bridge, connecting with the road to Roosville, replaced the ferry. In 1914, Gateway became officially known as Newgate and was designated the secondary crossing, when Roosville was re-established as the primary crossing. However, the offices handled only customs but not immigration. Although the Roosevelt settlement was farther north, the post itself was at the boundary line. In 1929, annual crossings were 1,542 at Newgate and 2,662 at Roosville. When GN ceased services on the route in 1935, the Newgate post closed. By 1941, the Newgate bridge was beyond repair. Instead, a road was built northward on the western shore to connect with the Waldo bridge.

About 25 miles east of the Roosville crossing, the Flathead sub-crossing opened in 1942. For years, the customs officer drove through Montana to reach the location, because no road existed on the Canadian side. In later years, the US post handled traffic both ways. In 1996, the crossing closed. A border post existed in the early 1900s somewhere in the Flathead River Valley.

During the 1940s, the Roosville crossing was open 8am to 6pm in winter and 8am to midnight in summer, handling about six cars daily. By the late 1950s, this had increased to about 500 daily. In 1959, a larger building was erected to accommodate customs and immigration. In 1966, the Roosville custom house (1898) was moved to the Fort Steele Heritage Town. The present Roosville facility was opened in 1991 and the service extended to 24 hours per day. The current hours remain unchanged.

== US side ==
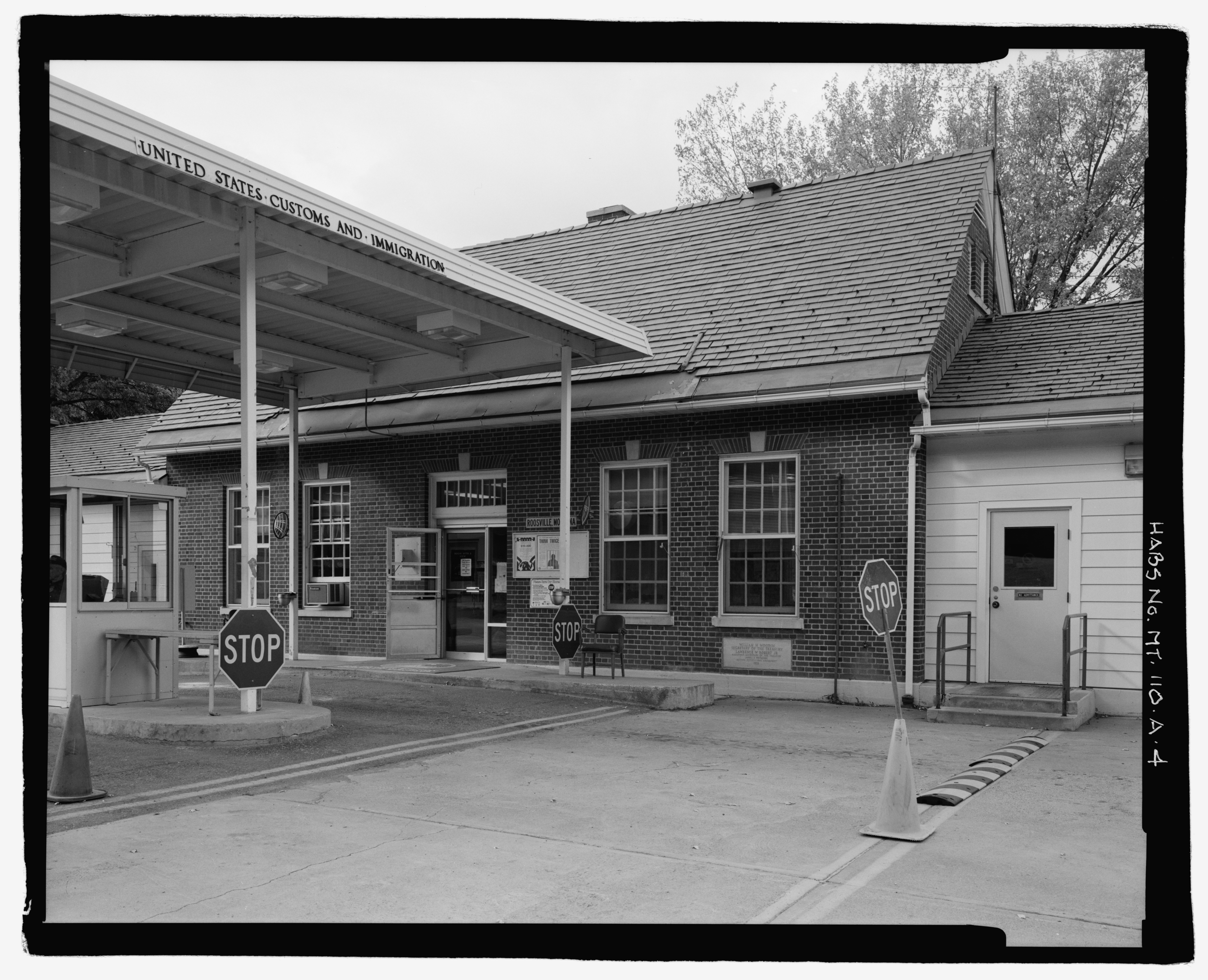
US Border Inspection Station at Roosville, Montana, 2001

The early border patrol history is unclear, but assumedly the US mirrored the establishment of a permanent post in the late 1890s. By 1900, one is known to have existed. When an office was established in 1902 at Gateway, Montana, the status of the Roosville, Montana, one is unclear. Assumedly, the US at least mirrored Canada by operating a Roosville post from 1914 and closed the Gateway one in 1935. During Prohibition in the United States, GN freighthoppers would smuggle liquor southward through Gateway. At Roosville, US customs patrols were limited, only venturing to the border two or three times a day. Liquor smugglers dared even to bribe US customs officers. The port of Roosville, Montana, also handled the Trailcreek-Flathead border crossing from 1942 until 1996.

The reservoir for the Libby Dam in Montana submerged Gateway in the early 1970s. Prior to the flooding, all the remaining buildings both sides of the border were removed or burned.

The current US border station, built in 2004, replaced the 1933 one (shown at the right). The crossing is the second-busiest in Montana and the westernmost. It is open 24 hours a day, 7 days a week.

== See also ==
- List of Canada–United States border crossings
