= Island Lake Lodge =

Backcountry cat skiing resort in British Columbia

Coordinates: 49°30′33″N 115°10′34.8″W

Island Lake Lodge is a back country tourist resort near Fernie, British Columbia, Canada, just outside the Mount Fernie Provincial Park. The resort covers 7,000 acres (28 km^{2}) of mountainous terrain.

During the winter cat-skiing operation, the land is used primarily by guests of the lodge, who access the lodge by snowcat. Members of the public use the cross-country trail system in the Cedar Valley, and some back-country touring groups access the high alpine terrain by traversing over from Fernie Alpine Resort. In summer, the access road is open to the lodge.

== Geography ==
Island Lake Lodge is surrounded by the Canadian Rockies in the southern portion of the Kootenay Range in Cedar Valley, to the west of the City of Fernie.

Unique weather patterns tend to bring much more precipitation to the area than usually found this far inland, creating benign conditions for powder skiing.

== History ==
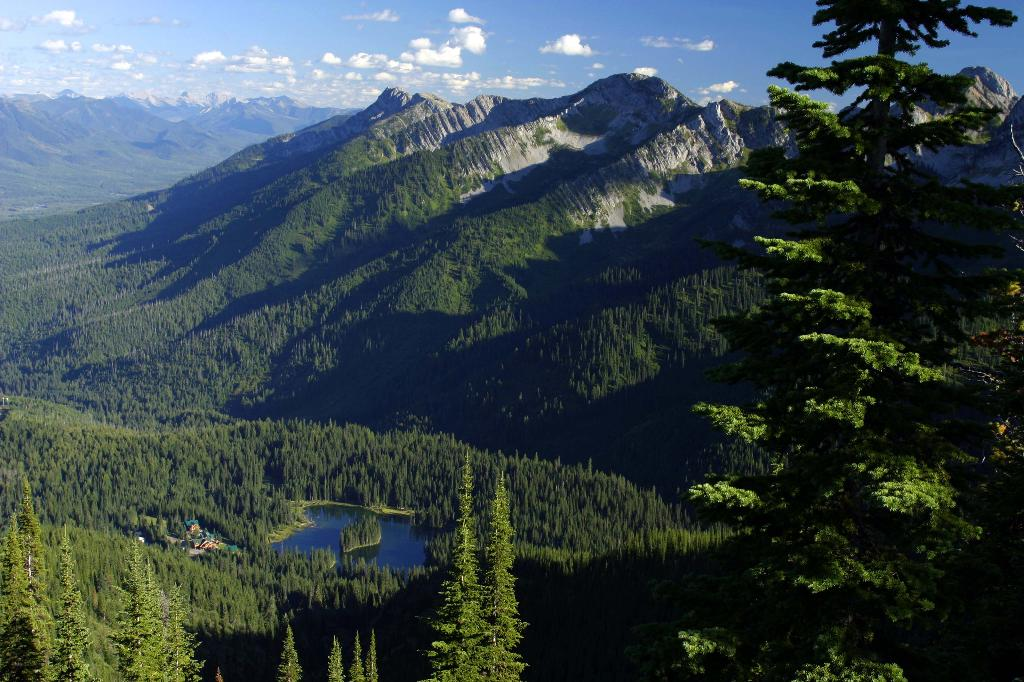
Island Lake's 7,000 acres (28 km^{2}) of land

The Island Lake property has been under private ownership since the early 1900s. In 1907, the North America Land and Lumber Company purchased the mill and timber rights to the area now known as the Island Lake Resort from the Cedar Valley Company. The mill was located at the junction of the existing access road (Mount Fernie Park Road) and Highway 3. Logging was restricted to the distance foresters were able to drag the logs to the mill and only the lower portion of the resort access road shows signs of high grade logging. Eventually, the land was sold to Shell Oil Company. Island Lake Mountain Tours began as a small back-country ski touring operation on the property in 1986, leasing the land from Shell. In 1988, one of the founders purchased a Pisten Bulley snowcat and catskiing at Island Lake was introduced.

Initially, accommodation, meals and leisure space were provided in the small Bear Lodge building. In 1994, Island Lake Mountain Tours purchased the land from Shell, becoming the only cat-skiing operation in British Columbia to own the land they operated on. In 1996, the accommodation capacity was increased with the construction of the Red Eagle Lodge. More upscale accommodation was added in the Cedar Lodge in 2002. Construction of the Tamarack Lodge, which now functions as the hub of the resort including a full serviced restaurant, spa facilities and eight luxury suites, commenced in 2004.

In April 2005, the property was purchased by the owners of Mica Heli Guides in Mica Creek, British Columbia who continued to operate the Resort.

Warren Miller (director) filmed "Ride" at Island Lake Lodge in 2002, and Teton Gravity Research filmed several films including "The Prophecy" (2002) and "Tight Loose" (2016) on the property. Bear Grylls and his crew filmed Episode 3 of Season 7 of the survival television program Man vs Wild at the lodge. Episodes of The Ride Guide, Canada AM, and Ski TV have also been shot on the property. Justin Timberlake celebrated his 31st birthday at the lodge with pro snowboarder Travis Rice.
