= Wigwam River =

River in Montana, United States and British Columbia, Canada

The Wigwam River is a tributary of the Elk River that flows through the U.S. state of Montana and the Canadian province of British Columbia. It is part of the Columbia River basin, as the Elk River is a tributary of the Kootenay River, which is a tributary of the Columbia.

The Wigwam is known for its flyfishing opportunities. Notably, water carried in the river at its origin will flow across the Canada-U.S. border on four distinct occasions: once on the Wigwam, twice on the Kootenay, and once on the Columbia.

== Course ==
The Wigwam River originates in the Galton Range of the Rocky Mountains in Lincoln County, Montana, at the confluence of Wolverine Creek and Bluebird Creek (approximately 48°58′N 114°51′W). It flows east and then north, crossing the 49th parallel and flowing in a generally northerly fashion for much of its course prior to making a sharp westerly turn immediately south of Mount Broadwood. It then runs west to its confluence with the Elk some distance south of Elko.

== See also ==
- List of rivers of British Columbia
- List of rivers of Montana
