= Mount Hosmer (British Columbia) =

Mountain in British Columbia, Canada

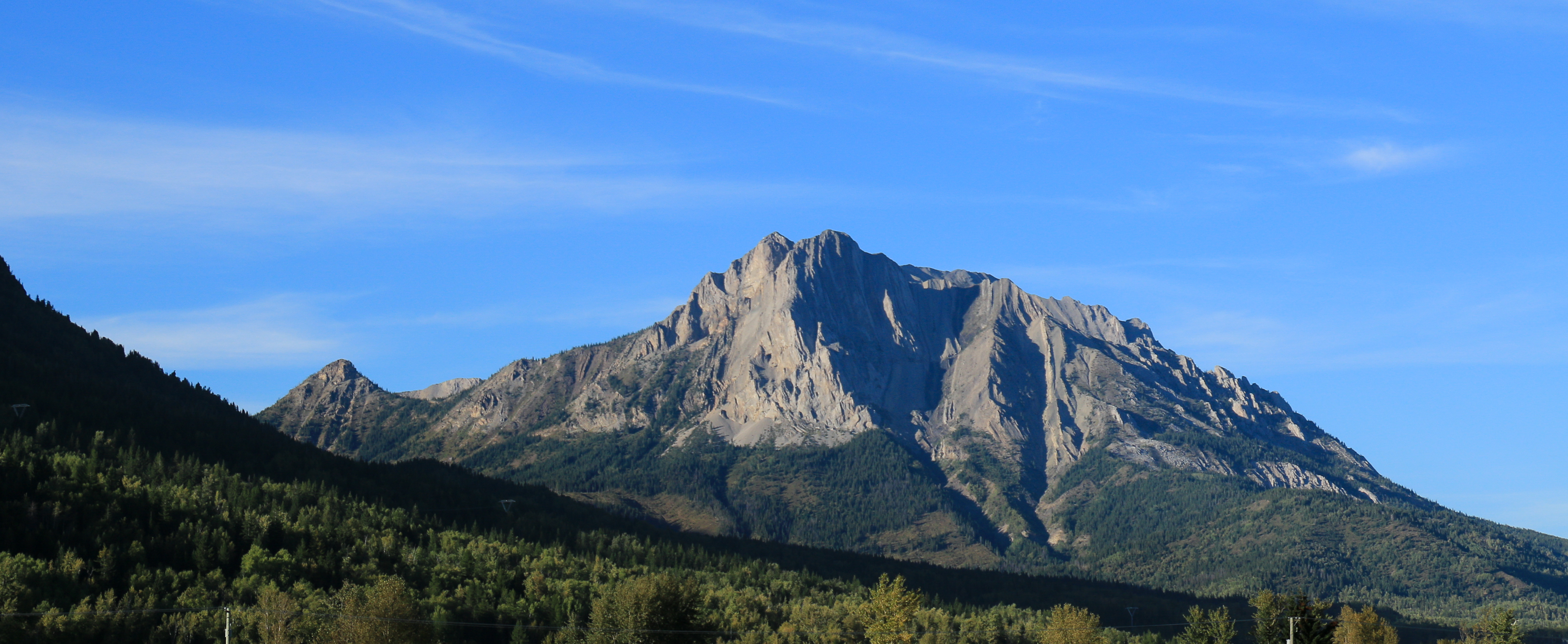

Highest point
- Elevation: 2,500 m (8,200 ft)
- Prominence: 590 m (1,940 ft)
- Listing: Mountains of British Columbia
- Coordinates: 49°36′50″N 115°00′41″W

Geography
- Location within British Columbia
- Interactive map of Mount Hosmer
- Location: British Columbia, Canada
- District: Kootenay Land District
- Parent range: Front Ranges
- Topo map: NTS 82G11 Fernie

Mount Hosmer is a mountain of the Canadian Rockies in British Columbia, Canada. It shares its name with the adjacent community of Hosmer, but its best-known elevation, a series of south-facing cliffs, can be seen from further down the Elk Valley in Fernie. The mountain is an upside down mountain, where the oldest part of the rock formation is near the top and the youngest is at the bottom.

== Ghost Rider ==
Ghost Rider is a shadow, particularly visible during summer evenings, cast on the central southern cliff face of Mount Hosmer. It closely resembles a figure on horseback followed by a second figure on foot. It has become incorporated into local folk legend and become symbolic of the community of Fernie. The Fernie Ghostriders hockey team takes its name from this shadow. Neil Peart's autobiography, Ghost Rider, also owes its title to the shadow, seen by Peart on his cross-country motorcycle journey detailed in the memoir (attributed by Peart to Three Sisters), although the title is also a play on Peart himself.
