= Coal Creek, British Columbia =

Ghost town in British Columbia, Canada

Coal Creek
- Location of Coal Creek in British Columbia
- Coordinates: 49°29′14″N 114°59′22″W
- Country: Canada
- Province: British Columbia

Coal Creek is a ghost town near Fernie, British Columbia, Canada. During the 1950s, residents left the town due to the closure of a mine. Some parts of the town remain, but most have been overtaken by forest. On May 22, 1902, an explosion in a mine left 128 dead in one of the worst mining disasters in Canadian history. Coal Creek, the town's namesake, is a tributary of the Elk River which it joins in Fernie, British Columbia. Coal Creek Mountain is next to Castle Mountain near Fernie.
