= Mount Hosmer =

Mount Hosmer may refer to:

- Mount Hosmer (British Columbia)
- Mount Hosmer (Iowa)
