= Albina Felski =

Canadian-American artist (1916–1996)

- Born: 1916; Fernie, British Columbia, Canada
- Died: 1996 (aged 79–80); Chicago, Illinois

Albina Felski (1916–1996) was a Canadian–American self-taught folk artist. Her work is included in the collections of the Smithsonian American Art Museum and the Smart Museum of Art. Felski's work was included in the 1975 exhibition, "Twentieth-Century Folk Art," at The Renaissance Society at the University of Chicago.
