= Mount Fernie =

Mountain in British Columbia, Canada

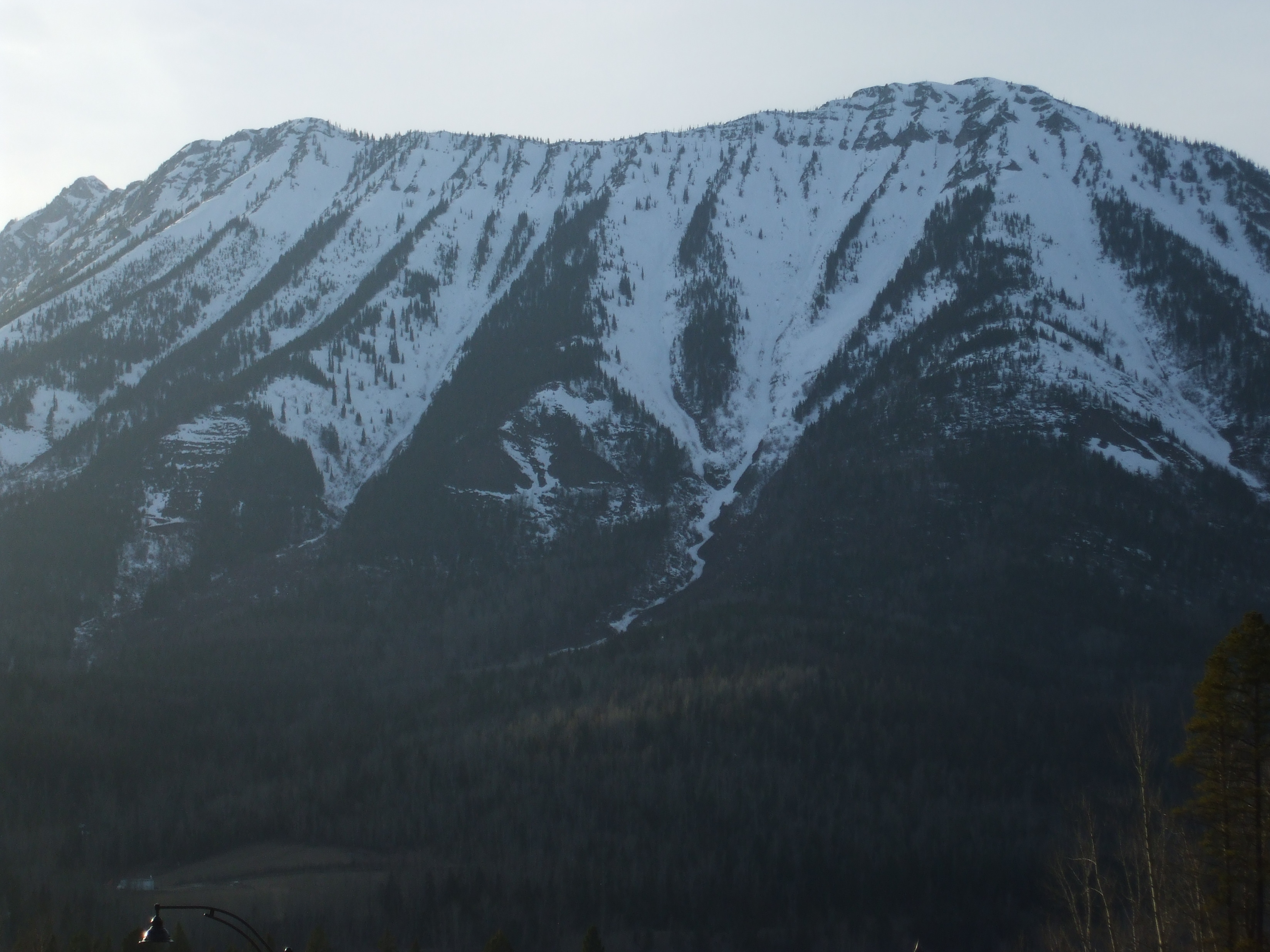
- Mount Fernie

Highest point
- Elevation: 2,210 m (7,250 ft)
- Coordinates: 49.524°N 115.123°W

Geography
- Location within British Columbia
- Location: Fernie, British Columbia, Canada
- District: Kootenay Land District
- Parent range: Canadian Rockies
- Topo map: NTS 82G11 Fernie

Mount Fernie is a 2,210-metre-high (7,251 ft) mountain located directly northwest of the town of Fernie, British Columbia. Mount Fernie Provincial Park is adjacent to the mountain.
