= Cal Hockley =

Canadian ice hockey player (1931–2020)

- Born: March 21, 1931 Fernie, British Columbia, Canada
- Died: December 10, 2020 (aged 89) Trail, British Columbia, Canada
- Height: 6 ft 0 in (183 cm)
- Weight: 190 lb (86 kg; 13 st 8 lb)
- Position: Center
- Played for: Trail Smoke Eaters
- National team: Canada
- Playing career: 1949–1965
Medal record
Men's ice hockey
Gold medal – first place	1961 Switzerland	Ice hockey

Francis Steward "Cal" Hockley (March 21, 1931 – December 10, 2020) was a Canadian ice hockey player with the Trail Smoke Eaters. He was the captain of the gold medal winning team at the 1961 World Ice Hockey Championships in Switzerland.
