= Hosmer, British Columbia =

Coordinates: 49°35′N 114°58′W

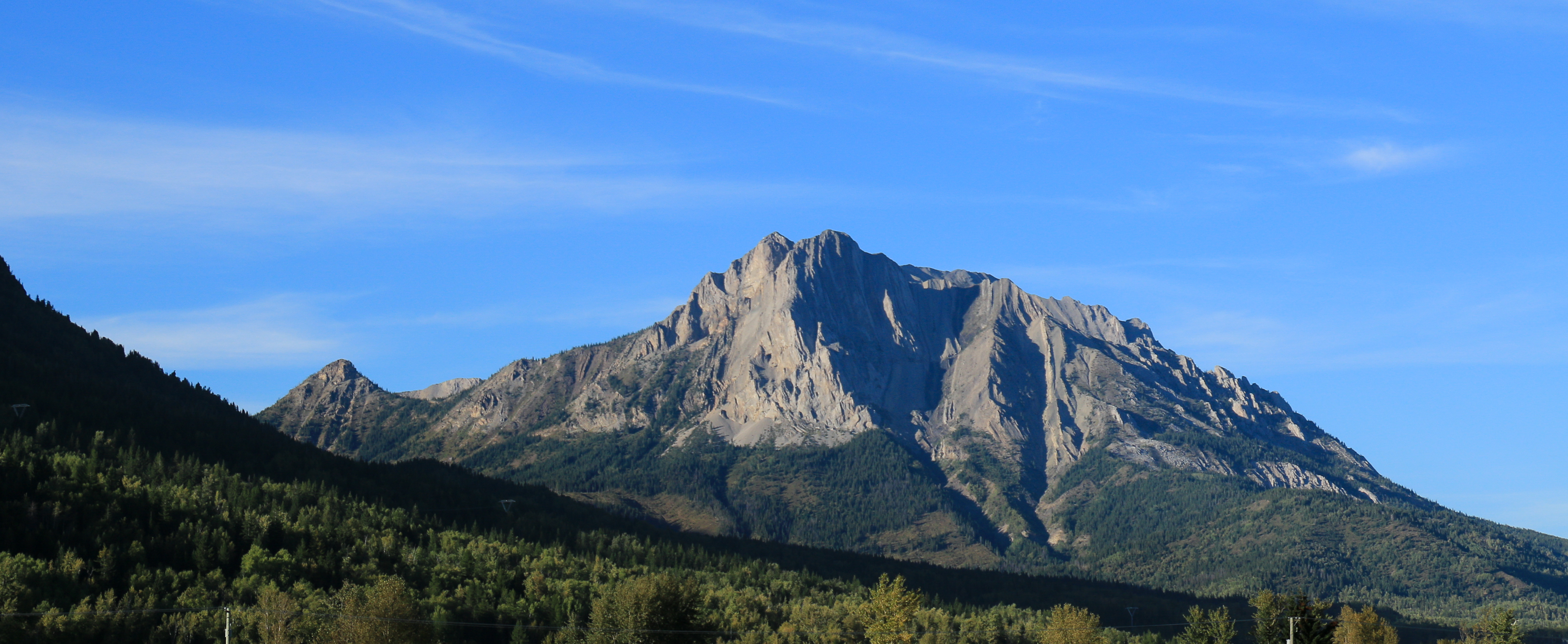
Mount Hosmer

Hosmer is a small Village near Fernie, and Sparwood, British Columbia, Canada. It is situated near Mount Hosmer.

Hosmer was named after Charles R. Hosmer, railway official.

== Local media ==
=== Newspapers ===
- Fernie Free Press - weekly paper
- Kootenay News Advertiser - weekly paper
- The Valley - weekly paper
- Fernie Fix - monthly glossy magazine

=== Radio stations ===
- 99.1 FM - CJDR, a rebroadcaster of CHDR-FM, Rock
- 92.7 FM - CFBZ, a rebroadcaster of CHBZ-FM, Country
- 97.7 FM - CBTN, a rebroadcaster of CBTK-FM, CBC

=== Cable Television Stations ===
- Channel 10: Shaw TV
- Channel 5: CFCN, CTV
- Channel 13: CBUT, CBC

== See also ==
- Fernie Ghostriders
- Elk River
- Elk Valley
- Kootenay Ice
