= Coal Creek (British Columbia) =

Coordinates: 49°30′00″N 115°04′00″W

Coal Creek is a tributary of the Elk River. Their confluence is in the city of Fernie, British Columbia. Coal Creek passes through its namesake, Coal Creek, British Columbia, today a ghost town.

== See also ==
- List of rivers of British Columbia
- Coal Creek (disambiguation)
