= Mount Proctor =

Mountain in British Columbia, Canada

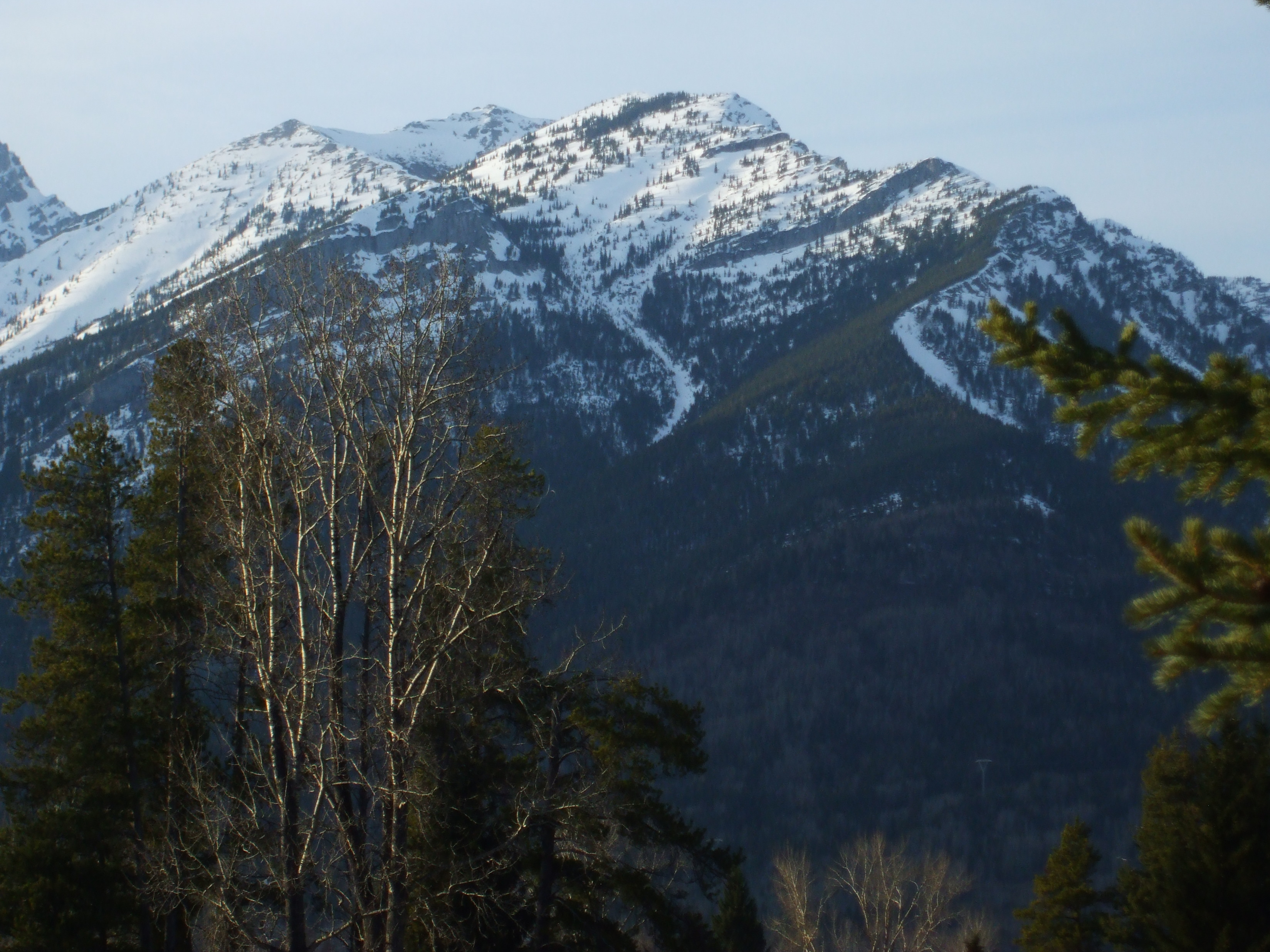

Highest point
- Elevation: 2,393 m (7,851 ft)
- Prominence: 41 m (135 ft)
- Listing: Mountains of British Columbia
- Coordinates: 49°33′54″N 115°04′42″W

Geography
- Location within British Columbia
- Country: Canada
- Province: British Columbia
- District: Kootenay Land District
- Parent range: Front Ranges
- Topo map: NTS 82G11 Fernie

Climbing
- Easiest route: Hiking trail

Mount Proctor is a mountain in British Columbia, Canada located near Fernie. Scaling 2,393 m (7,851 ft), this limestone mountain is home to a very popular hiking trail.

The legend of Mount Proctor tells of a young Indian chief who could not decide whom to marry and was turned into the mountain. The Three Sisters peak facing Mount Proctor is said to be the three maidens. Before there was an Alpine resort at the Fernie Alpine Resort, there was an Alpine resort at Mount Proctor around 1960.
