= Darren Servatius =

Canadian ice hockey player (1965–2019)

- Born: April 15, 1965; Fernie, British Columbia, Canada
- Died: November 20, 2019 (aged 54); Okotoks, Alberta
- Height: 6 ft 2 in (188 cm)
- Weight: 200 lb (91 kg; 14 st 4 lb)
- Position: Defense
- Shot: Right
- Played for: Johnstown Chiefs
- NHL draft: undrafted
- Playing career: 1987–1990

Darren Servatius (April 15, 1965 – November 20, 2019) was a professional hockey player who spent his entire career with the Johnstown Chiefs of the AAHL and ECHL.

== Career ==
Servatius played his junior hockey in the BCJHL, skating with the Salmon Arm Shuswap Totems for seven games during the 1982–83 season, and later with the Richmond Sockeyes in 1985–86

Servatius joined the newly formed Johnstown Chiefs in January 1988, as the AAHL season had already been in progress. He led all Chiefs defenseman with 10 goals and 33 points during the 1987–88 AAHL season. Servatius was also known for being one of the team's "tough guys" and was tied for seventh in the league (with teammate Rick Boyd) for penalty minutes.

During the 1988–89 season, the Chiefs made the jump from the AAHL to the newly formed ECHL, and Servatius was named captain upon former captain Rick Boyd's departure to the IHL. Servatius once again led the Chiefs defensemen in goals (8) and scored a career-high 55 points.

With Boyd's return, Servatius served as an alternate captain during the Chiefs 1989–90 season and finished the season with 31 points in 53 games.

== Personal ==
Servatius had a younger brother Ron who also skated on the 1988–89 Chiefs. Like his brother had done the previous year, Ron Servatius finished the season with 199 penalty minutes, which was the second-highest total on the Chiefs and tied for seventh-highest in the league.

Servatius retired after the 1989–90 season. He was the owner and operator of Pro-Fish Guiding & Rafting for many years, which was based in his hometown of Fernie, British Columbia. He was one of the first professional guides in the Elk Valley and still holds a record for catching Bull trout in those rivers. Later on he also worked as a heavy equipment operator in Northern Alberta. He resided with his partner Connie Haggerty-Servatius in Fernie, British Columbia and Okotoks, Alberta.

== Death ==
Servatius died on November 20, 2019, from complications of diabetes. He was 54 years old.
