= Three Sisters (Elk Valley) =

Mountain north of Fernie, British Columbia, Canada

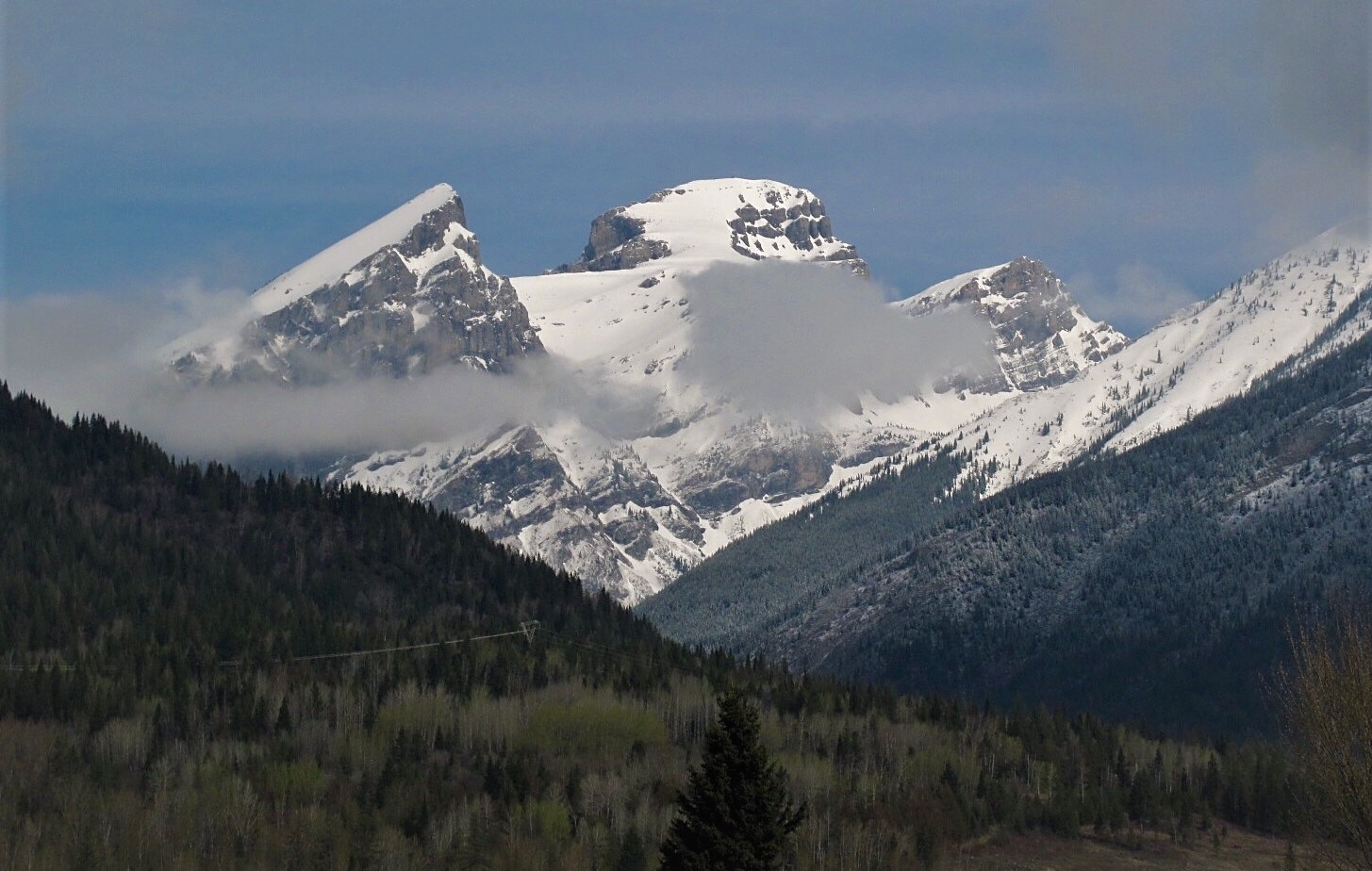

Highest point
- Elevation: 2,788 m (9,147 ft)
- Prominence: 506 m (1,660 ft)
- Coordinates: 49°34′36″N 115°06′08″W

Geography
- Location within British Columbia
- Location: British Columbia, Canada
- District: Kootenay Land District
- Topo map: NTS 82G11 Fernie

The Three Sisters is a mountain immediately north of Fernie, British Columbia, northwest of the confluence of Fairy Creek with the Elk River. It should not be confused with the Alberta Rockies' peaks of the same name, located further north outside Canmore.

The summit on the middle sister is the highest point in the Fernie area, at 2,788 m (9,147 ft). The Three Sisters is a popular subject for photographers.

Local legend states this peak came about because a young Indian chief could not choose between three girls for a wife, so he was turned into Mount Proctor. The maidens were so distraught, they prayed to be turned into mountains as well, and became the Three Sisters.

== Gallery ==
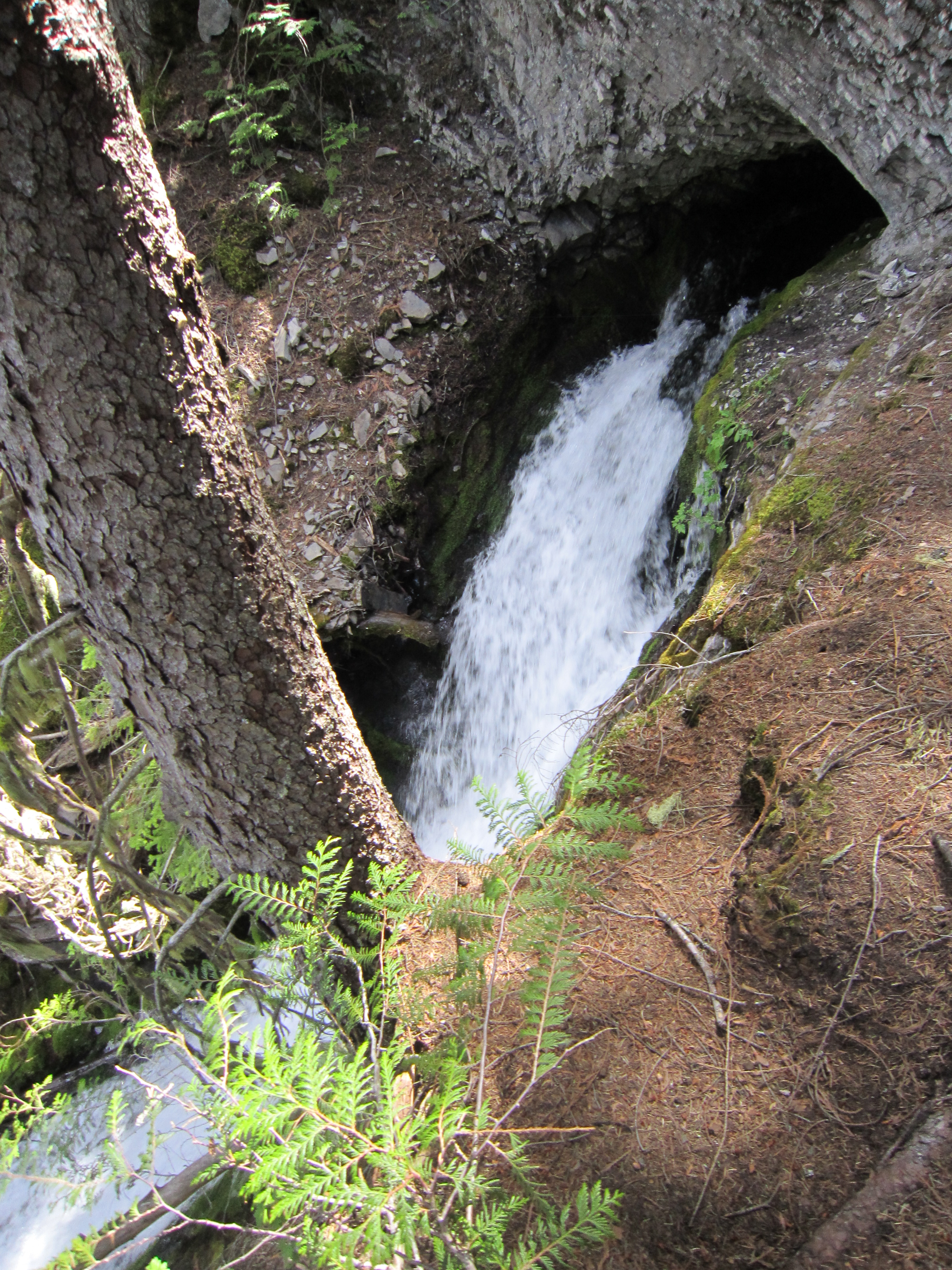
Heiko's Trail, Water Gate, Three Sisters hike

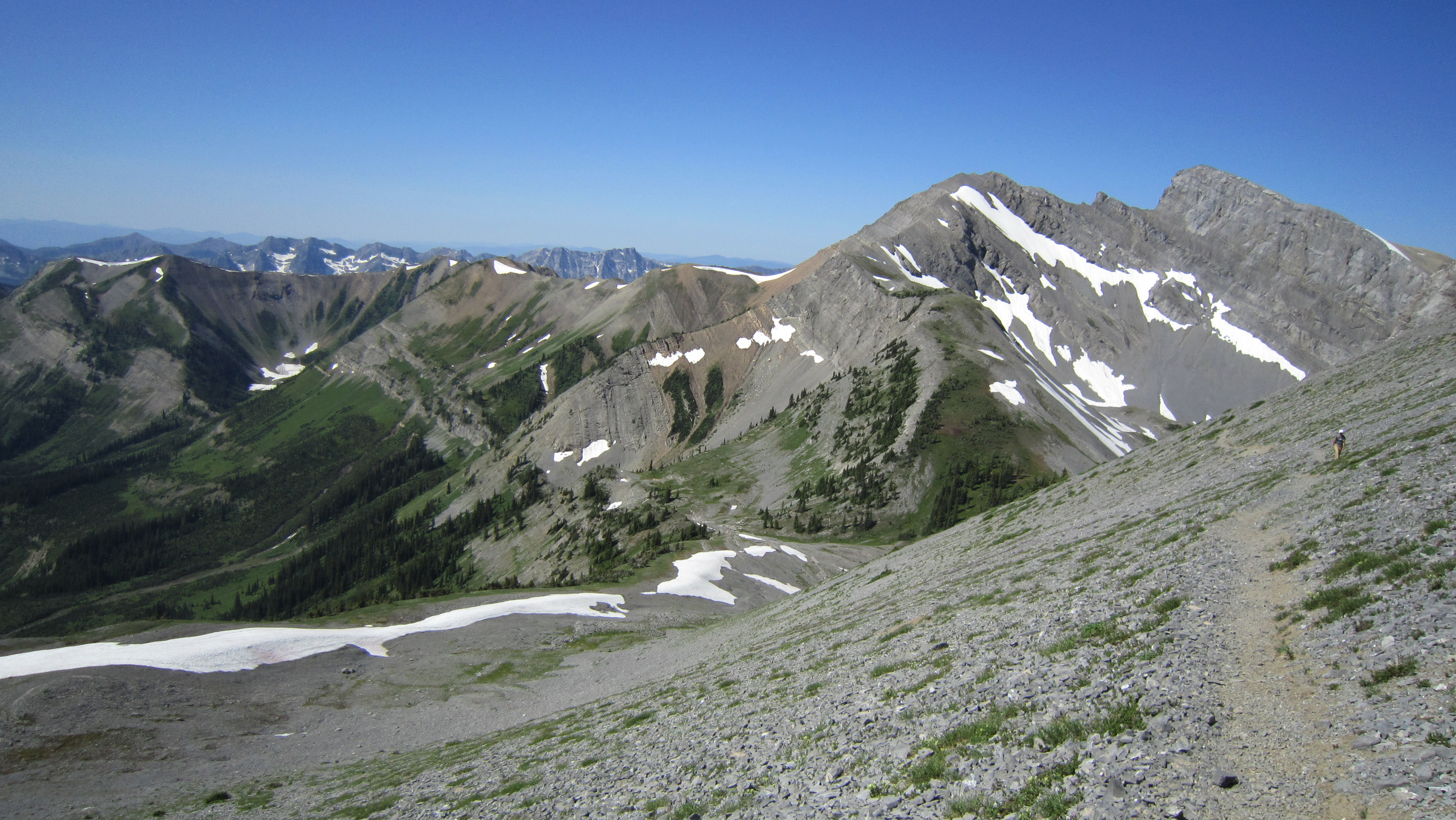
Heiko's Trail, Three Sisters hike

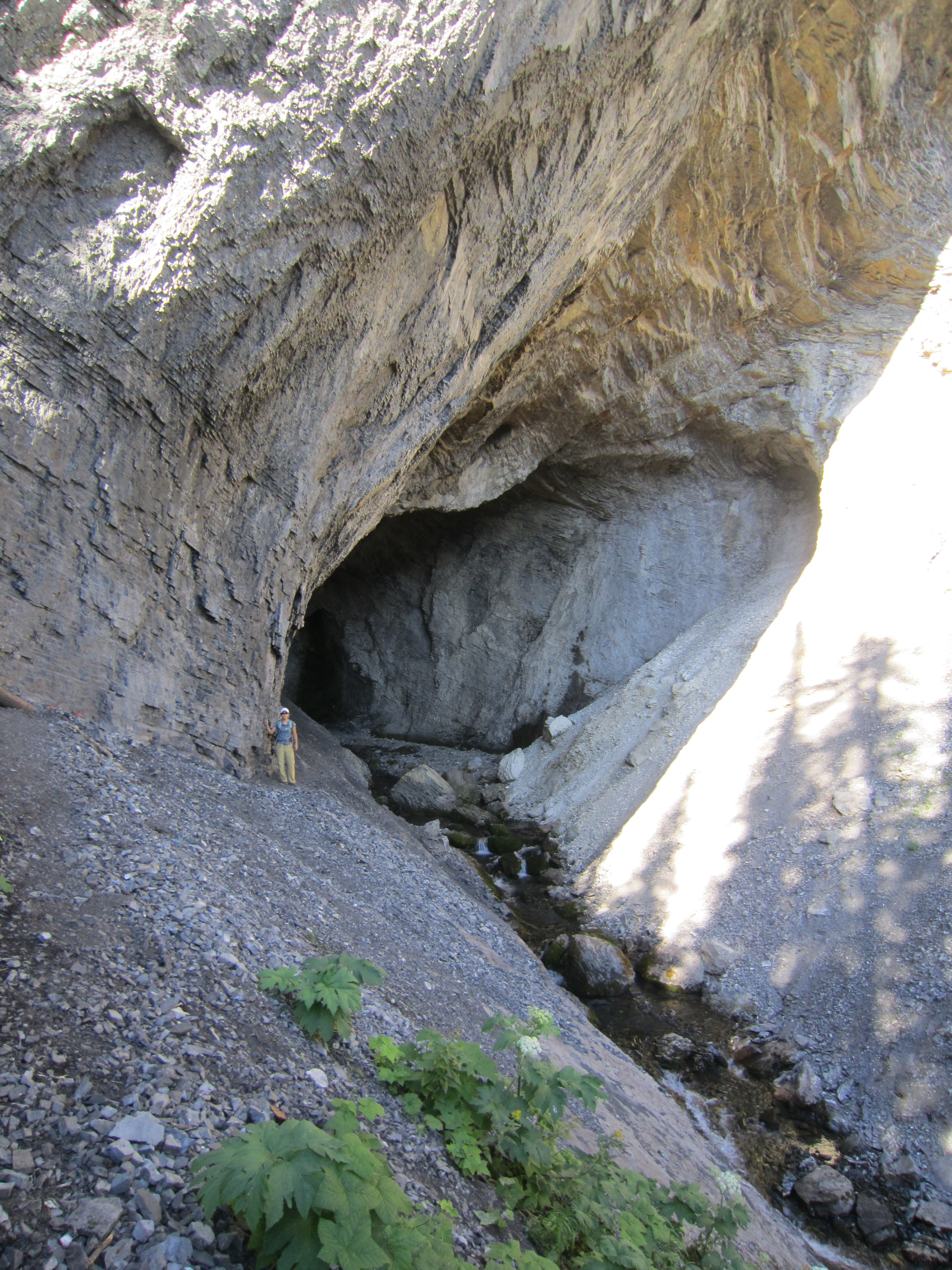
Heiko's Trail, Bisaro cave, Three Sisters hike

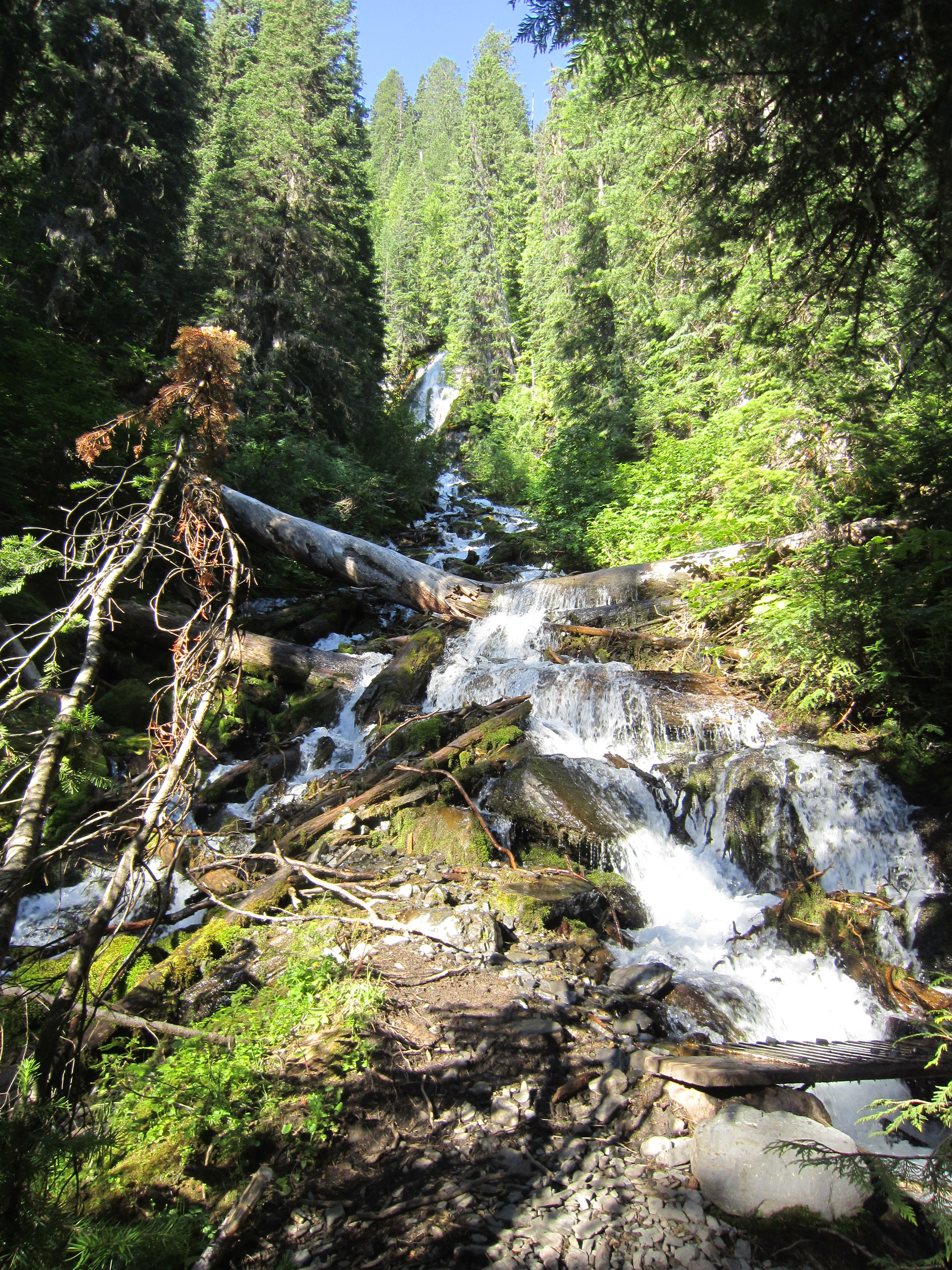
Heiko's Trail, Waterfall along the way, Three Sisters hike

== See also ==
- Three Sisters Range
