= Roosville, Montana =

Unincorporated community in Montana, U.S.

Coordinates: 48°59′57″N 115°03′24″W

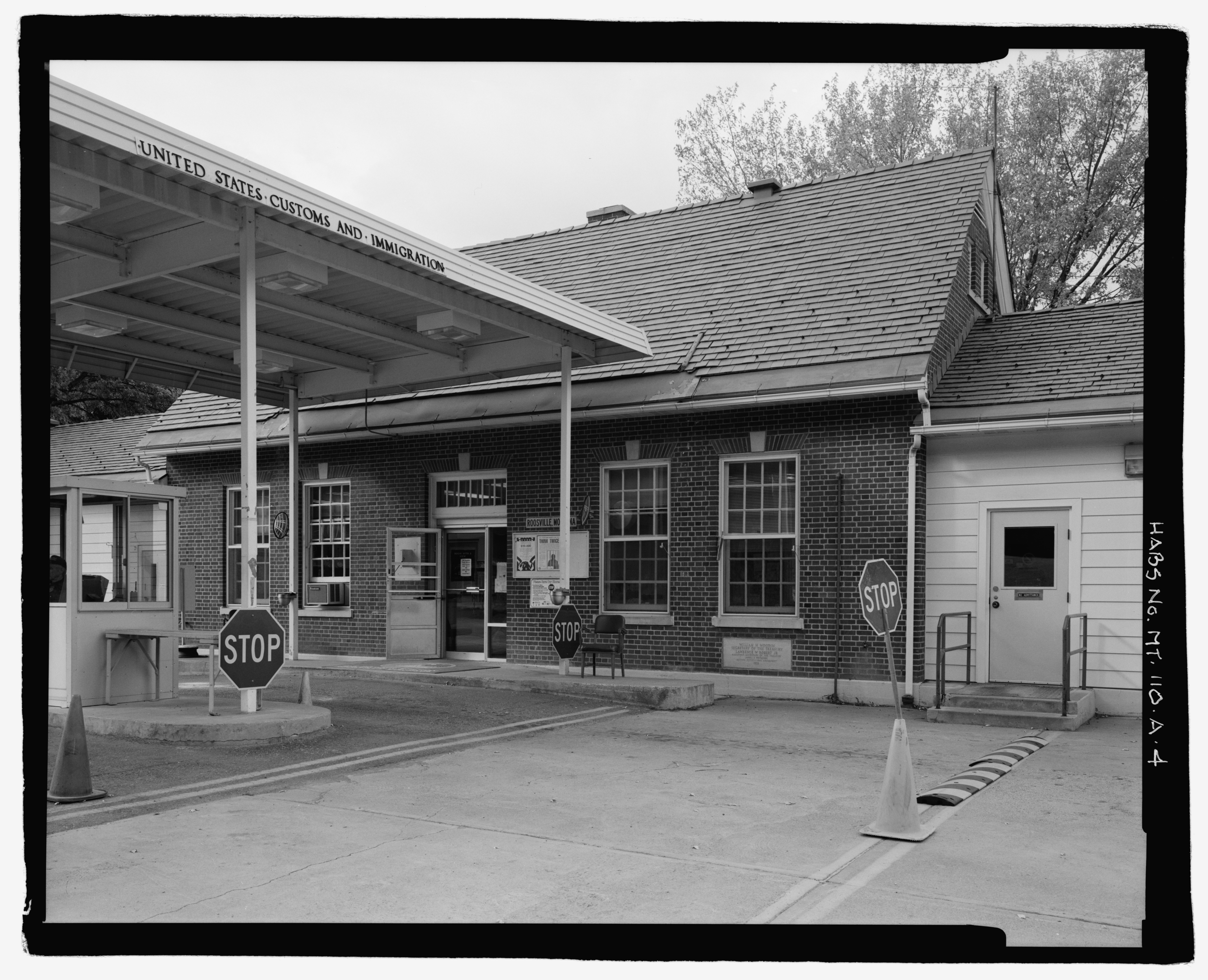
U.S. Customs Service Port of Roosville, Main Port Building, U.S. Highway 93

Roosville is an unincorporated community and United States Port of Entry on the Canada–United States border in Lincoln County, Montana, United States, at the terminus of US Highway 93. The locality on the Canadian side of the border is also named Roosville and is the southern terminus of British Columbia provincial highway 93.
