= Elko, British Columbia =

Elko
- Location of Elko in British Columbia Elko (Canada)
- Coordinates: 49°18′00″N 115°06′42″W
- Country: Canada
- Province: British Columbia
- Region: Elk Valley/East Kootenay
- Regional District: Regional District of East Kootenay

Government
  - MP: Rob Morrison
  - MLA: Pete Davis
- Elevation: 951 m (3,120 ft)

Population (2006)
  - Total: 163
- Time zone: UTC−07:00 (MST)
  - Summer (DST): UTC−06:00 (MDT)
- Area code: 250 / 778 / 236
- Highways: Highway 3 Highway 93
- GNBC Code: JAQTX

Elko is located at the junction of Highway 93 and the Crowsnest Highway, to the north of the Roosville Canada–United States border crossing. A small sawmill town, Elko is situated near the southern end of the Rocky Mountain Trench at the edge of a plateau at the base of the Canadian Rockies, in the East Kootenay region of southeastern British Columbia.

== Location ==
Elko is located in the extreme southeastern corner of British Columbia, in the Regional District of East Kootenay, at the junction of Highway 93 and Highway 3, 20 mi (32 km) south of Fernie and approximately 23 mi (37 km) north of the Canada–United States border border crossing at Roosville.

Angling is available on the Kootenay River and the nearby Bull River.

The population of Elko is 163.

== History ==
The Kutenai (Ktunaxa) had for generations mined argillite in the neighbourhood, there was nothing at Elko but a few survey stakes and a crude tote road before the Foley Brothers' grading crews worked through here towards the end of May, 1898, building the roadbed of the B.C. Southern. When the railroad went through in July, the Canadian Pacific Railway erected what it called a "Crowsnest Pass Branch Standard Second Class Station" and Elko began to grow as Charles E. Ayre's North Star Lumber Company commenced operations in the woods. North Star soon built a 100,000 board foot-per-day planer mill on the BC Southern near the Elko station to finish the rough lumber coming out of their mill near Jaffray, while nearby the Leask and Johnson saw mill screamed out 60,000 per day. Eventually at least nine timbering outfits were at work along the railway, on the delta of the Elk and the shores of the Kootenay River.

As the last of the easy timber was cut or burned away in the several fires which ravaged the area between 1904 and 1910, the smaller lumber companies began to shut down. Though ranching and orchard industries sprung up on the deforested acres, they did not employ nearly the numbers that logging had and the pace of commerce in Elko slowed. The recession following the Great War diminished coal exports from the mines farther up the Elk and the railroads scaled back their operations.

=== Fires ===
As it was in so many pioneer settlements built mostly from wood, fire was Elko's nemesis. A blaze in 1914 gave a foretaste of the conflagration of Monday, 8 September 1919, which consumed the old Melbourne House, Fred Roo's general store and post office, the telephone exchange, and the pool hall. In 1924 a "hurricane" ripped through the valley damaging the town, and a fire in early December 1925 wiped out more of the central business district. It was nothing, however, compared to the inferno that blew into the community from the delta on Tuesday, 18 August 1931.

== Wildlife ==
The most common wildlife in the Elko area are mainly elk, whitetail deer, mule deer, big horn sheep, turkey, grouse, and black bear. Which can be commonly and often seen throughout the area. Uncommon animals that are located in the area but are more elusive includes wolves, cougar, grizzly bear, moose, and a large assortment of birds and rodents.

== Local media ==
=== Radio stations ===
- 102.9 FM - CHDR-FM, Rock, Cranbrook
- 104.7 FM - CHBZ-FM, Country, Cranbrook
- 101.3 FM - CBC Radio One, Kelowna

=== Cable television stations ===
- Channel 5: CFCN, CTV
- Channel 13: CBUT, CBC

== See also ==
- Fernie Ghostriders
- Elk River
- Elk Valley
- Kootenay Ice
