= Coal Creek (Henry County, Missouri) =

Stream in the American state of Missouri

Coordinates: 38.3261338°N 93.7510455°W

Coal Creek is a stream in Henry County in the U.S. state of Missouri.

Coal Creek was so named on account of coal deposits near its course.

== See also ==
- List of rivers of Missouri
