= Rexford, Montana =

- Town
- Location of Rexford, Montana
- Coordinates: 48°53′59″N 115°10′17″W
- Country: United States
- State: Montana
- County: Lincoln

Area
  - Total: 0.085 sq mi (0.22 km^{2})
  - Land: 0.085 sq mi (0.22 km^{2})
  - Water: 0 sq mi (0.00 km^{2})
- Elevation: 2,543 ft (775 m)

Population (2020)
  - Total: 78
  - Density: 923/sq mi (356.4/km^{2})
- Time zone: UTC-7 (Mountain (MST))
  - Summer (DST): UTC-6 (MDT)
- ZIP code: 59930
- Area code: 406
- FIPS code: 30-62200
- GNIS feature ID: 2412545

Rexford is a town in Lincoln County, Montana, United States. The population was 78 at the 2020 census.

The town began with the construction of the Great Northern Railway’s branch line from Jennings to Fernie, British Columbia in 1901. Rexford incorporated in 1966 in order to negotiate with the U.S. Army Corps of Engineers during construction of the Libby Dam.

== Geography ==
According to the United States Census Bureau, the town has a total area of 0.10 square miles (0.26 km^{2}), all land.

Rexford was originally located on the Kootenai River, but with the damming of the river in the 1970s the original townsite was flooded and the town was moved to its current location approximately 10 miles west of Eureka on Montana Highway 37. It is on the shore of Lake Koocanusa.

=== Climate ===
This climatic region is typified by large seasonal temperature differences, with warm to hot (and often humid) summers and cold (sometimes severely cold) winters. According to the Köppen Climate Classification system, Rexford has a humid continental climate, abbreviated "Dfb" on climate maps.

== Demographics ==
Historical population
Census	Pop.	Note	%±
1970	243		—
1980	130		−46.5%
1990	132		1.5%
2000	151		14.4%
2010	105		−30.5%
2020	78		−25.7%
U.S. Decennial Census

=== 2010 census ===
As of the census of 2010, there were 105 people, 50 households, and 31 families living in the town. The population density was 1,050.0 inhabitants per square mile (405.4/km^{2}). There were 99 housing units at an average density of 990.0 units per square mile (382.2 units/km^{2}). The racial makeup of the town was 94.3% White, 4.8% Native American, and 1.0% from two or more races. Hispanic or Latino of any race were 3.8% of the population.

There were 50 households, of which 16.0% had children under the age of 18 living with them, 48.0% were married couples living together, 4.0% had a female householder with no husband present, 10.0% had a male householder with no wife present, and 38.0% were non-families. 20.0% of all households were made up of individuals, and 14% had someone living alone who was 65 years of age or older. The average household size was 2.10 and the average family size was 2.39.

The median age in the town was 57.6 years. 15.2% of residents were under the age of 18; 3% were between the ages of 18 and 24; 13.4% were from 25 to 44; 37.1% were from 45 to 64; and 31.4% were 65 years of age or older. The gender makeup of the town was 51.4% male and 48.6% female.

=== 2000 census ===
As of the census of 2000, there were 151 people, 70 households, and 45 families living in the town. The population density was 1,447.3 inhabitants per square mile (558.8/km^{2}). There were 81 housing units at an average density of 776.4 units per square mile (299.8 units/km^{2}). The racial makeup of the town was 86.75% White, 7.95% Native American, 2.65% from other races, and 2.65% from two or more races. Hispanic or Latino of any race were 3.31% of the population.

There were 70 households, out of which 18.6% had children under the age of 18 living with them, 47.1% were married couples living together, 11.4% had a female householder with no husband present, and 34.3% were non-families. 31.4% of all households were made up of individuals, and 11.4% had someone living alone who was 65 years of age or older. The average household size was 2.16 and the average family size was 2.59.

In the town, the population was spread out, with 17.9% under the age of 18, 11.3% from 18 to 24, 23.8% from 25 to 44, 28.5% from 45 to 64, and 18.5% who were 65 years of age or older. The median age was 43 years. For every 100 females there were 93.6 males. For every 100 females age 18 and over, there were 87.9 males.

The median income for a household in the town was $22,604, and the median income for a family was $22,917. Males had a median income of $38,333 versus $20,250 for females. The per capita income for the town was $12,355. There were 16.9% of families and 24.6% of the population living below the poverty line, including 54.3% of under eighteens and 6.5% of those over 64.

== Government ==
In 2023 Bill Marvel was elected mayor. In 2025 two town council members were elected, Patsy Reece and Paul Middlemore.

== Recreation ==
The Pacific Northwest National Scenic Trail passes through Rexford.

== See also ==
- List of municipalities in Montana
