= Krag, British Columbia =

Krag
- Location of Krag in British Columbia
- Coordinates: 49°10′20″N 115°13′30″W
- Country: Canada
- Province: British Columbia

Krag is a ghost town located in the East Kootenay region of British Columbia, Canada. The town is situated near the ghost town of Waldo at Junction of Elk and Kootenay Rivers, Southeast of Cranbrook. Krag was flooded and the town is now underwater.
