= Roosville, British Columbia =

Roosville
- Location of Roosville in British Columbia
- Coordinates: 49°00′03″N 115°03′10″W
- Country: Canada
- Province: British Columbia
- Region: East Kootenay
- Regional district: East Kootenay
- Area codes: 250, 778, 236, & 672
- Highways: Highway 93

Roosville is a small farming community immediately north of the Canada–United States border in the East Kootenay region of southeastern British Columbia. On BC Highway 93, the locality is east of Lake Koocanusa, at the southeast corner of Tobacco Plains Indian Reserve No. 2.

Sharing the name are adjacent Roosville, Montana and the Roosville Border Crossing.

== First Nations ==
As early as the 1840s, the region was known as Tobacco Prairie and later as Tobacco Plains. The Tobacco Plains band has inhabited this land since time immemorial. The traditional name in the Ktunaxa language for this site is ¿/u¿/uqa, pronounced tsoo-tsoo-qa.

== Name origin ==
The Hudson's Bay Company (HBC) moved Fort Kootenay several times within the plains region, finally settling immediately north of the boundary on the east shore of the Kootenay River. In 1865, Michael Phillipps, a clerk, transferred to this outpost for a brief period. In the 1890s, he established a ranch on the plains and the area became known as Phillips.

In 1899, Fred Roo was granted a liquor licence for his hotel at Phillips. A month later, he took charge of the general store. The next year, Fred Roo built a larger hotel. By 1901, he was calling the location Roosville. A year later, the new name was in common usage.

== Community ==
Michael Phillipps was the inaugural postmaster 1899–1903, when the post office closed. Michael and many of his descendants are buried in the Roosville cemetery. Fred Roo was the next postmaster 1908–1922. The post office closed in 1926. In 1910, Miss N. Bartlett was the inaugural school teacher. During the earlier decades, Roosville was centred farther north than the border, closer to present day Grassmere.

Around 1930, the general store closed. During the mid-1930s, a National Defence Relief camp existed at Roosville. In 1949, the school closed.

At the border, a four-unit motel operated 1965–1989.

== See also ==
- Roosville Border Crossing
