= Lake Koocanusa =

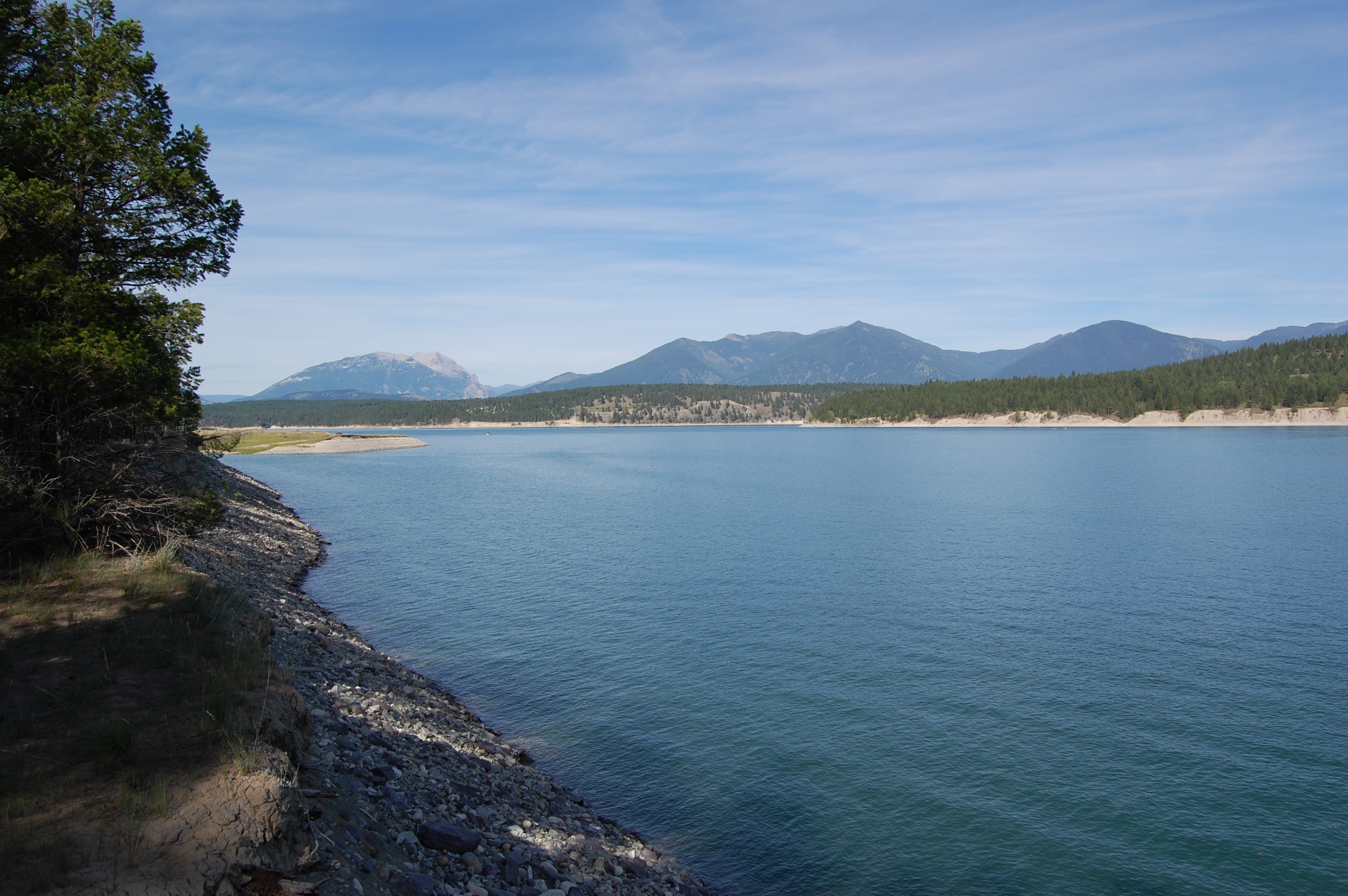

- Location within Montana Location within the United States
- Location: Montana / British Columbia
- Coordinates: 48.92°N 115.18°W
- Lake type: reservoir
- Primary inflows: Kootenay River (Canada)
- Primary outflows: Kootenai River (USA)
- Basin countries: United States, Canada
- Surface elevation: 2,459 feet (750 m)

Lake Koocanusa (/ˌkuː kæn juː ɛs ˈeɪ/ Koo-Can-U.S.A.; alternatively, /ˌkuːkəˈnjuːsə/ koo-kə-NYOO-sə) is a reservoir in British Columbia (Canada) and Montana (United States) formed by the damming of the Kootenai River by the Libby Dam in 1972. The dam was formally dedicated by US President Gerald Ford on August 24, 1975.

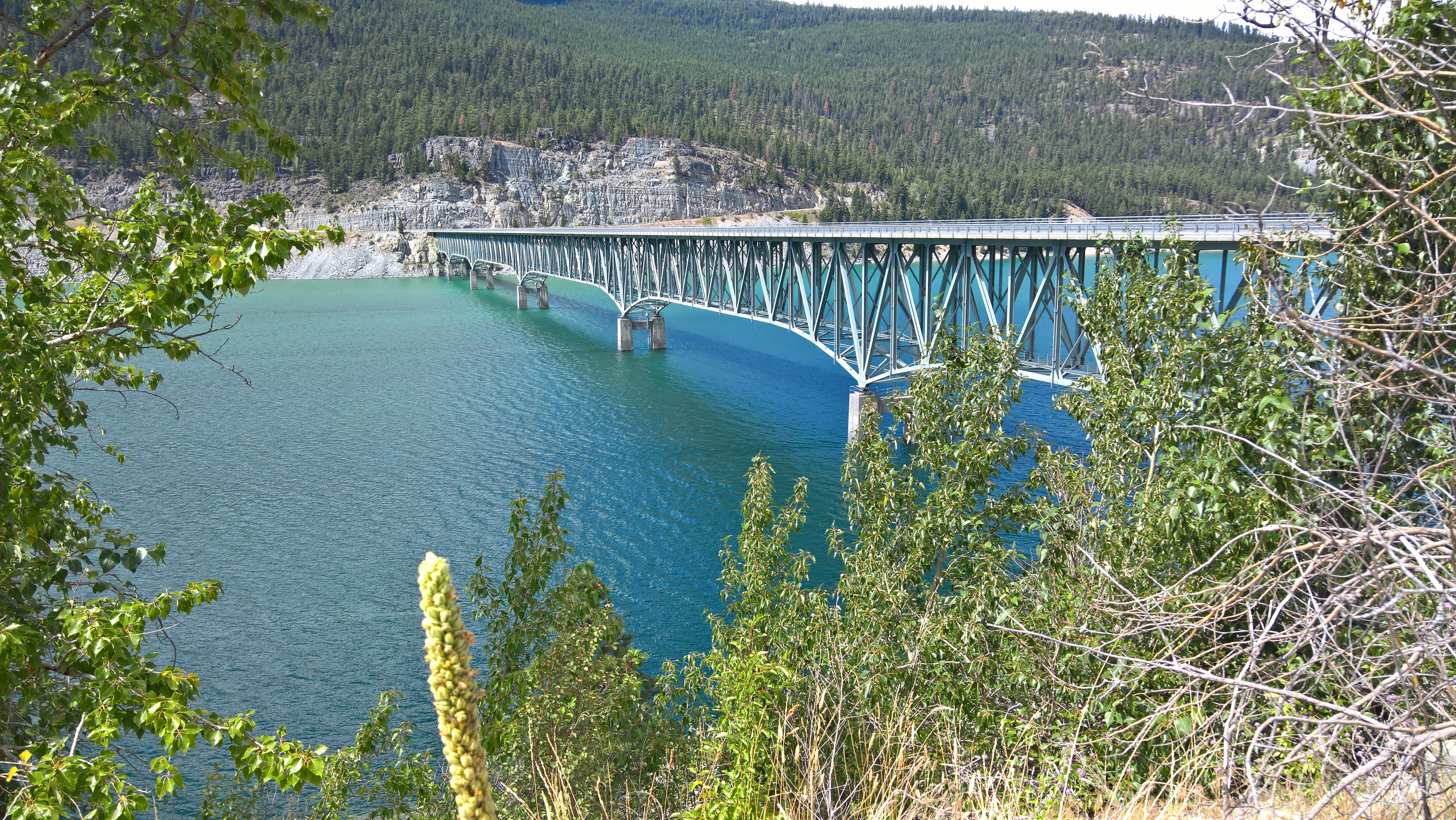
The Koocanusa Bridge over the lake from the east bank

The lake is formed north of the dam, reaching 48 miles (77 km) to the Canada–United States border and 42 miles (68 km) further into British Columbia. The lake holds 13% of the water in the Columbia River system. The town of Rexford was moved, as well as the Great Northern Railway line. The town of Waldo, British Columbia, is now covered by the lake. What was once a barrier to river travel, Jennings Canyon is now inundated by the lake. The Elk River joins the Kootenay River in the northern part of Lake Koocanusa, within Canadian territory.

Lake Koocanusa was named in a contest won by Alice Beers of Rexford, Montana. The name is a portmanteau of Kootenai River, Canada, and USA. To avoid confusion over the pronunciation of the lake's name, local residents encourage the pronunciation Koo-kan-you-es-a, with the final element pronounced as the individual letters of the abbreviation USA rather than as yusa.

Lake Koocanusa was built as a joint project of the U.S. and Canada. It is 26 km (16 mi) from Libby, Montana, also on the Kootenai River, from which the dam gets its name. Libby Dam has a Visitors Center and can be accessed by the Lake Koocanusa Scenic Byway which begins in the nearby town of Libby.

The Pacific Northwest National Scenic Trail follows Highway 37 along the east side of the lake before crossing over the Lake Koocanusa Bridge and climbing up Webb Mountain.

== Selenium contamination ==
According to a March 8, 2021 article in The Narwhal, concerns had been raised about selenium pollution leaching from Teck Resources' Elk Valley open-pit coal mines' waste rock, which is upstream from the lake system. A September 2020 Montana Department of Environmental Quality presentation to the Board of Environmental Review Meeting reported that the 95% of the selenium coming into Lake Koocanusa originated from the Elk River—"which has been contaminated by current and historic coal mining in the Elk Valley." The average selenium levels in Lake Koocanusa were 1 part per billion. Montana established new standards for selenium—0.8 parts per billion. Because of the high bioaccumulation of selenium in fish, excessive levels of selenium in an aquatic ecosystem has implications for human health. In the spring of 2020, Teck Resources had "reported a dramatic decline in adult westslope cutthroat trout in Elk Valley waterways closest to its mines". Since 2015, British Columbia and Montana have agreed to adopt aligned standards for selenium levels by 2020. Montana's has been in force since the fall of 2020, but British Columbia has not aligned their standards yet.

== Fish ==
The lake supports a wide variety of fish species. Below is a table detailing the various fish species which may be encountered on the lake.

Species	Family	Native to Montana
Brook trout	Trout	Introduced
Bull trout	Trout	Native
Burbot	Codfish	Native
Kokanee	Trout	Introduced
Largemouth bass	Sunfish	Introduced
Largescale sucker	Sucker	Native
Longnose dace	Minnow	Native
Longnose sucker	Sucker	Native
Mountain whitefish	Trout	Native
Northern pike	Pike	Introduced
Northern pikeminnow	Minnow	Native
Mylocheilus caurinus	Minnow	Native
Pumpkinseed	Sunfish	Introduced
Rainbow trout	Trout	Introduced
Redside shiner	Minnow	Native
Westslope cutthroat trout	Trout	Native
Yellow perch	Perch	Introduced

== See also ==
- List of lakes of British Columbia
