= Mount Fernie Provincial Park =

Provincial park in British Columbia

- IUCN category III (natural monument or feature)
- Location within British Columbia
- Interactive map of Mount Fernie Provincial Park
- Location: Fernie, British Columbia, Canada
- Coordinates: 49°29′20″N 115°06′07″W
- Area: 259 ha (640 acres)
- Established: May 4, 1959
- Governing body: BC Parks

Mount Fernie Provincial Park is a provincial park located just west of the town of Fernie in British Columbia, Canada. It was established on May 4, 1959 to protect the ecology of the lower Lizard River while providing recreational opportunities for local residents and visitors alike. The park is named after Mount Fernie, a prominent peak located north of the park.
