= Elk Valley (British Columbia) =

Valley in British Columbia, Canada

Coordinates: 49.546°N 115.005°W

The Elk Valley is a valley in the southeastern Kootenay region of British Columbia, Canada. Located in the heart of the Canadian Rockies, the Elk Valley is approximately 60 kilometres from the Alberta and Montana borders.

== Geography and location ==
The valley runs via the basin of the Elk River from the southeastern Alberta border near Kananaskis to the Rocky Mountain Trench. Communities in the valley, from uppermost to lowermost, are Elkford, Sparwood, Hosmer, Fernie, Morrissey, and Elko. The valley features a diverse topography, including low-lying wetlands, mixed grassland-forest areas, and steep, forested uplands. The Elk River meanders 220 kilometers through the valley, connecting with Lake Koocanusa and the Kootenay River near the Montana border.

== Ecosystem and wildlife ==
The Elk Valley is a critically important wildlife corridor for the movement of wide-ranging carnivores such as grizzly bears, wolves, wolverines, and lynxes. It supports a variety of large animals, including moose, elk, bighorn sheep, mule deer, black bears, grey wolves, cougars, and others. The area is vital for the conservation of these species in the North American Rocky Mountains.

== History and economy ==
Historically, the Elk Valley was a significant centre of the coal mining industry in British Columbia for over a century, serving as a hub of labour activism and regularly electing socialist independents to the legislature. It is the largest producing coal field in the province, with millions of tons of coal being exported to steel mills globally. All operating coal mines in the Elk Valley are currently owned by Glencore. In recent years, tourism has gained importance in the Elk Valley. The region attracts outdoor enthusiasts for activities like snowmobiling, skiing, hiking, angling, and hunting. Its natural beauty and adventure opportunities are contributing to a growing tourism sector.

== See also ==
- Elk Valley Provincial Park
