= Elk River (British Columbia) =

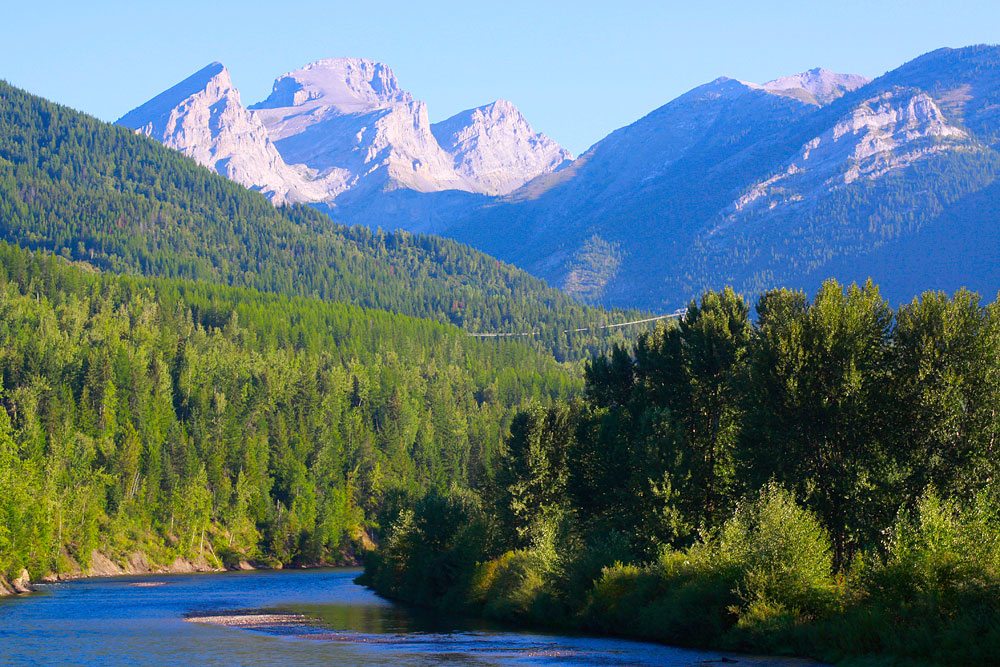
- Elk River near Fernie, British Columbia

Location
- Country: Canada
- Province: British Columbia
- District: Kootenay Land District

Physical characteristics
- Source: Upper Elk Lake
  - location: Rocky Mountains
  - coordinates: 50°33′N 115°07′W
- Mouth: Kootenay River
  - location: Lake Koocanusa
  - coordinates: 49°10′N 115°13′W
- Length: 220 km (140 mi)
- Basin size: 4,450 km^{2} (1,720 sq mi)
- Discharge
  - location: At Phillips Bridge
  - average: 75.6 m^{3}/s (2,670 cu ft/s)
  - minimum: 5.66 m^{3}/s (200 cu ft/s)
  - maximum: 1,020 m^{3}/s (36,000 cu ft/s)

The Elk River is a 220-kilometre (140 mi) long river, in the southeastern Kootenay district of the Canadian province of British Columbia. Its drainage basin is 4,450 square kilometres (1,720 sq mi) in area. Its mean discharge is approximately 60 cubic metres per second (2,100 cu ft/s), with a maximum recorded discharge of 818 cubic metres per second (28,900 cu ft/s). It is a tributary of the Kootenay River, and falls within the basin of the Columbia River.

== Course ==
The Elk River originates from the Elk Lakes near the Continental Divide in the Rocky Mountains. It flows through the Elk Valley in a southwesterly direction, joining the Kootenay River in Lake Koocanusa, just north of the British Columbia-Montana border. Its waters ultimately join the Columbia River and flow towards the Pacific Ocean.

The Elk River runs through the communities of Elkford, Sparwood, Hosmer, Fernie, and Elko.

== History ==
David Thompson travelled along the Elk River in 1811, and called it the Stag River. James Sinclair's second settlement expedition to the Pacific Northwest from the Red River Colony made a difficult crossing from the Kananaskis River valley into the Columbia–Kootenays via the Elk in 1854. The river was labelled Elk River on John Palliser's 1857–58 map and "Stag or Elk River" on Arrowsmith's 1862 map.

=== Elko Dam ===
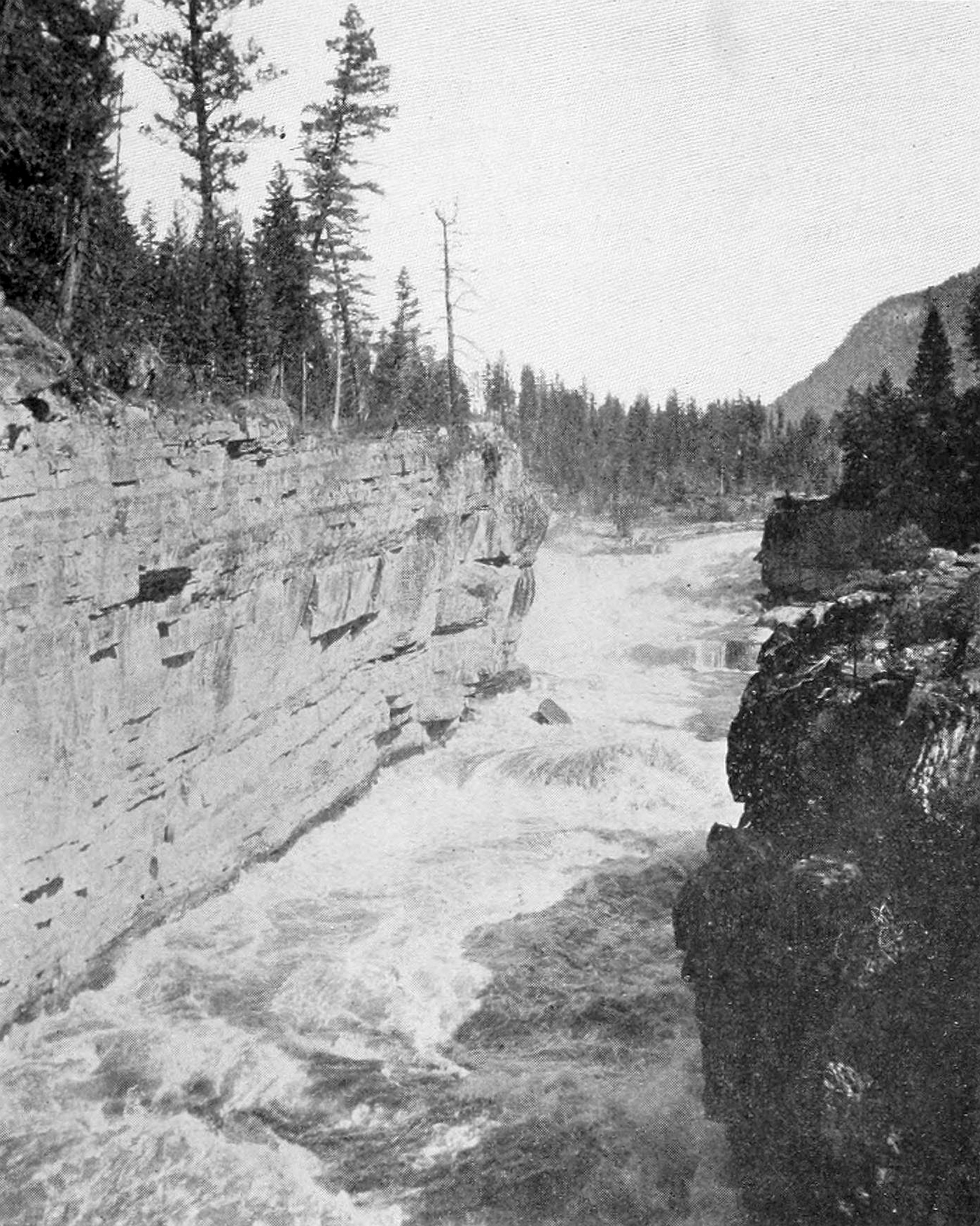
Elk River south of Elko, 1891

Elko Dam was built by East Kootenay Power Company on the Elk River in 1924. It is a run-of-the-river dam 16 metres (52 ft) tall and 66 metres (217 ft) long. The powerhouse has two Francis turbines producing 12MW of electricity. It is about 16 kilometres (10 mi) upriver from the Elk's confluence with Lake Koocanusa. It is operated by BC Hydro.

=== Coal mining impacts ===
The Elk River Valley is home to four large open-pit coal mines, producing steel-making coal. For many years increased selenium, phosphate and nitrate levels have been linked to the continued expansion of the mining. Selenium levels continue to exceed the guidelines for human health. The selenium pollution has heavily impacted the cutthroat trout in the river, which suffer from deformation of their gills.

Glencore, as the operator of the coal mines that are the source of the selenium pollution, is working to implement selenium management strategies. They operate the West Line Creek Active Water Treatment Plant. British Columbia provincial officials agreed to involve to International Joint Commission in 2024. While tribes in the U.S. and Canada have long desired this, BC officials have previously resisted commission involvement.

== Fishing ==
The Elk River is a popular fly-fishing destination for cutthroat and bull trout.

== Tributaries ==
- Fording River
- Michel Creek
- Coal Creek
- Lizard Creek
- Wigwam River
