= Fernie, British Columbia =

Fernie
- City
- The Corporation of the City of Fernie
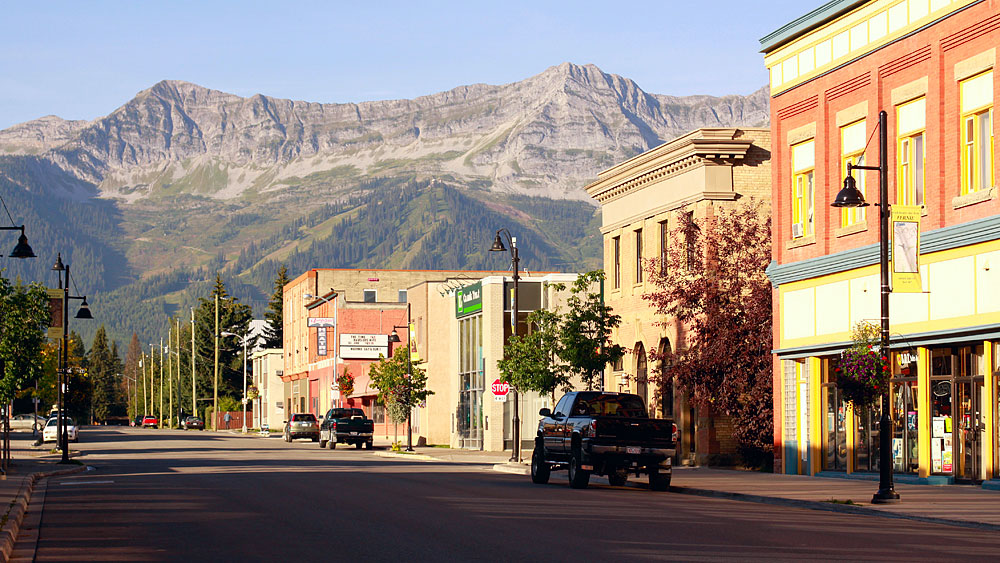
- Downtown Fernie, looking south

- Flag Logo
- Motto(s): "In montibus ad flumen" (Latin) "In the mountains by the river"
- Location of Fernie in British Columbia
- Coordinates: 49°30′15″N 115°03′46″W
- Country: Canada
- Province: British Columbia
- Region: Elk Valley/East Kootenay
- Regional district: East Kootenay
- Established: 1904

Government
  - Mayor: Harshan Ramadass
  - Governing body: Fernie City Council
  - MP: Rob Morrison
  - MLA: Pete Davis (politician)

Area
  - City: 13.50 km^{2} (5.21 sq mi)
- Elevation: 1,010 m (3,310 ft)

Population (2016)
  - City: 5,249; Ranked 692nd
  - Metro: 7,192
- Time zone: UTC-6 (Central Standard (CST))
- Postal code span: V0B 1M(0–6)
- Area codes: 250, 778, 236, 672
- Highways: Highway 3
- Website: fernie.ca

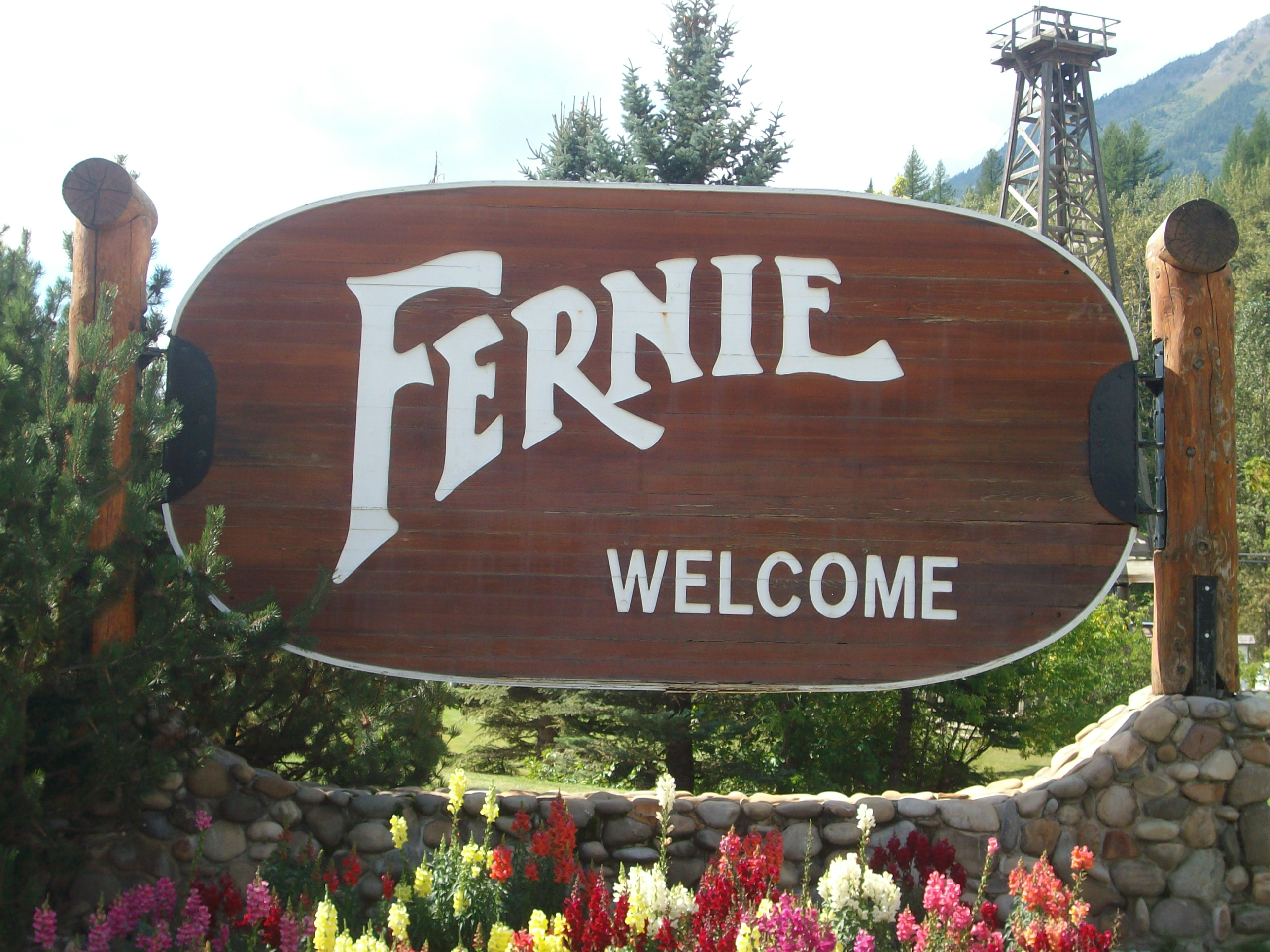
Fernie's welcome sign

Fernie is a city in the Elk Valley area of the East Kootenay region of southeastern British Columbia, Canada, located on BC Highway 3 on the western approaches to the Crowsnest Pass through the Rocky Mountains. Founded in 1898 and incorporated as the City of Fernie in July 1904, the municipality has a population of over 5,000 with an additional 2,000 outside city limits in communities under the jurisdiction of the Regional District of East Kootenay. A substantial seasonal population swells the city during the winter months.

Fernie lies on the Elk River, along Canada's southernmost east-west transportation corridor through the Rockies that crosses the range via the Crowsnest Pass, 40 kilometres (25 miles) to the east. As the largest and longest-established community between Cranbrook and Lethbridge, Fernie serves as a minor regional centre, particularly for its fellow Elk Valley communities.

== Geography ==
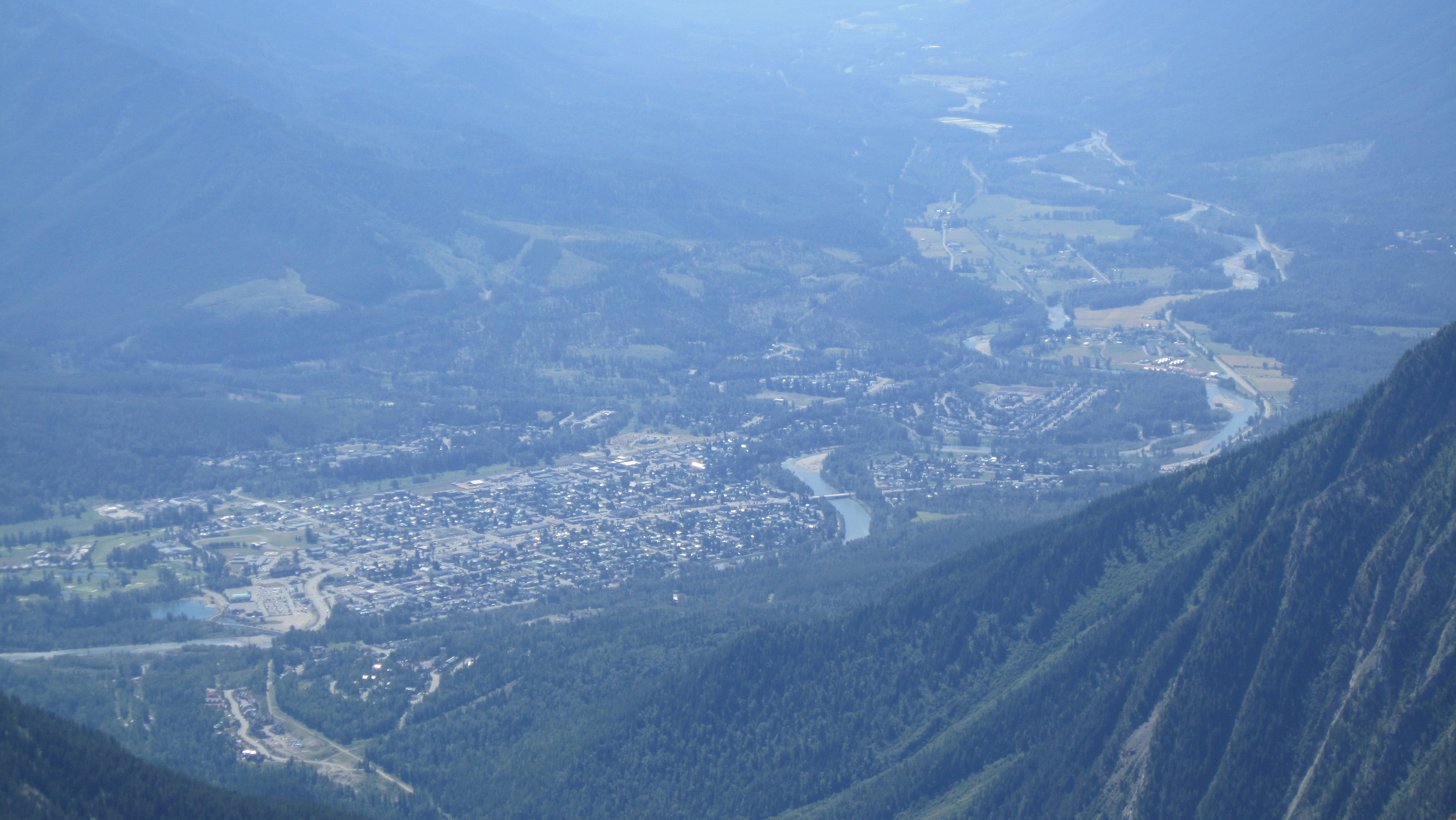
The city of Fernie, BC seen from Three Sisters mountain

Fernie is the only city-class municipality in Canada that is fully encircled by the Rocky Mountains. The townsite was laid out in the crook of a doglegged glacial valley that today is drained by the Elk River. Three tributaries of the Elk—Coal, Lizard, and Fairy Creeks—rise in its side valleys and join the Elk either within or in close proximity to the townsite.

To the north of the city lie Mount Fernie, Mount Klauer, The Three Sisters and Mount Proctor. To the northeast is Mount Hosmer, to the east is Fernie Ridge, to the southeast is Morrissey Ridge and to the southwest are the various peaks of the Lizard Range. Fernie gives the name to the Jurassic-Age Fernie Formation. The Lizard Range is home to Fernie Alpine Resort, one of the largest ski resorts in Canada, and Island Lake Catskiing, a resort.

== History ==
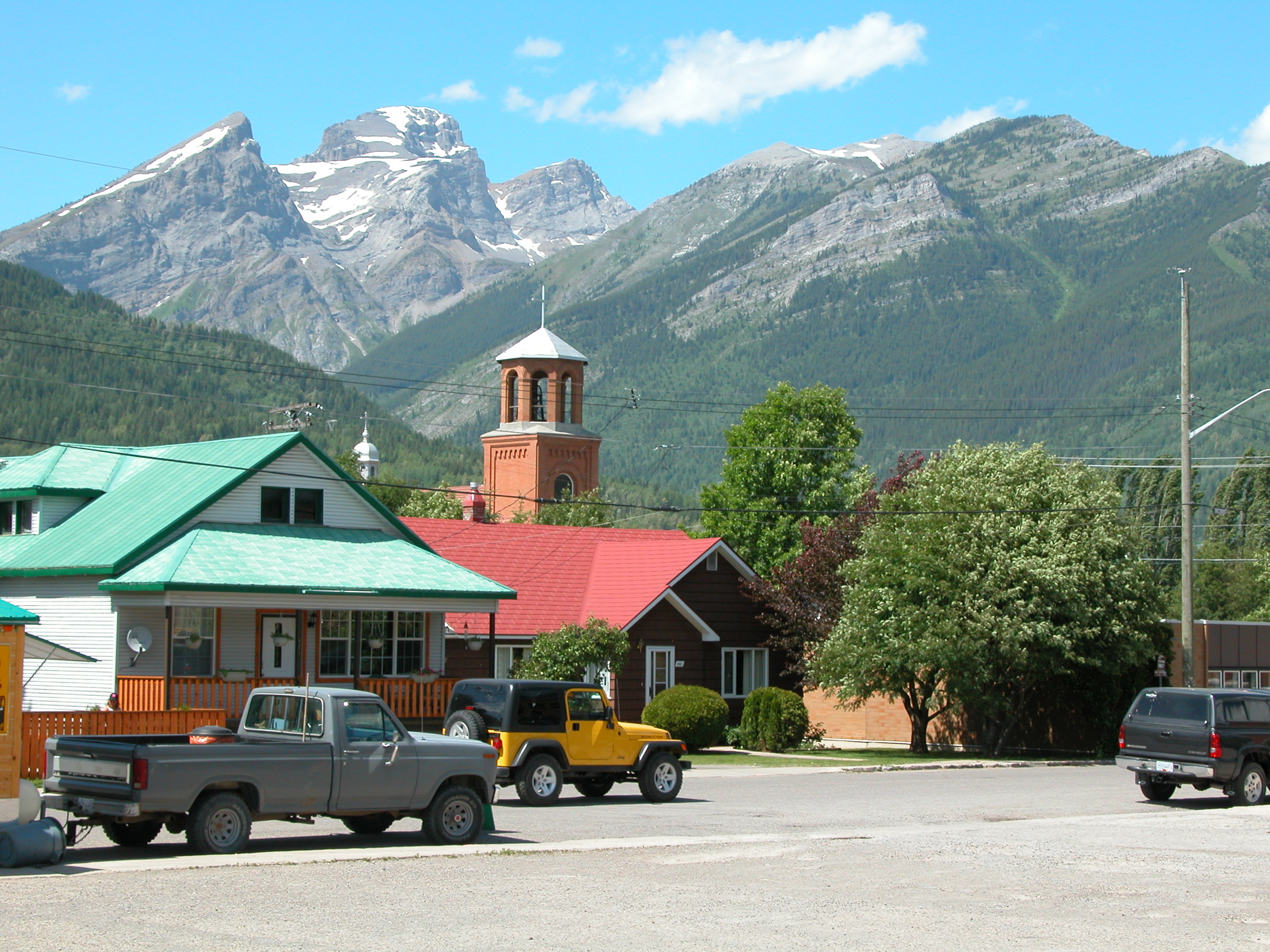
The Three Sisters and Mount Proctor, as seen from central Fernie

While the slopes of the mountains are the present focus of economic activity, until comparatively recently residents of the area were more interested in the mountains' innards. The vast Crowsnest Coal Field lies just to the east of the city, and Fernie owes its origins to nineteenth-century prospector William Fernie, who established the coal industry that continues to exist to this day. Acting on pioneer Michael Phillips' twin discoveries of coal and the Crowsnest Pass a few years earlier, Fernie founded the Crows Nest Pass Coal Company in 1897 and established a temporary encampment near Coal Creek. The Canadian Pacific Railway arrived in the valley the following year, and a townsite emerged parallel to the railway line slightly north of the initial encampment, or "Old Town."

On May 23, 1902, a coal mine explosion killed 109 miners at the Crow's Nest Coal Mining Company. The disaster, one of the worst mining accidents in Canadian history, is largely forgotten in Fernie and overlooked by local historians after more than a century. During World War One, an internment camp for prisoners of war was set up at rented premises in Fernie from June 1915 to October 1918.

Underground coal mines were dug 10 kilometres (6.2 miles) away from the townsite in the narrow Coal Creek valley and until 1960 a small satellite community was known as Coal Creek stood adjacent to them. A variety of other mines were sunk into the coal fields in a fifty-kilometre (31 mi) radius in the following two decades. No mining was ever carried out in Fernie proper; coking of Coal Creek coal was carried out at the townsite, but otherwise, the town developed into an administrative and commercial centre for the burgeoning industry. Forestry played a smaller role in the local economy and a local brewery produced Fernie Beer from Brewery Creek (mountain spring water).

Like most single-industry towns, Fernie endured several boom-and-bust cycles throughout the twentieth century, generally tied to the global price of coal. The mines at Coal Creek closed permanently by 1960 and the focus of mining activity shifted to Michel and Natal about twenty-five kilometres (16 miles) upriver, which sat on a more productive portion of the Crowsnest Coal Field. Kaiser Resources opened immense open-pit mines there in the 1970s to meet new metallurgical coal contracts for the Asian industrial market, predominantly for use in blast furnaces. Fernie would remain an important residential base for mine labour, along with the new communities of Sparwood and Elkford that sprang up much closer to these new mines. Today, Glencore operates four open-pit mines, shipping out in 152 car unit trains along the Canadian Pacific Railway through Fernie to the Pacific Coast, where the coal is loaded onto freighters at Roberts Bank Superport in Delta.

=== Flathead Valley avalanches ===
The Flathead Valley avalanches were two avalanches that buried 11 snowmobilers near Fernie on December 28, 2008. The avalanches ultimately claimed the lives of eight of the riders.

== Architectural heritage ==
After a disastrous fire levelled much of the downtown core in 1904, the fledgling municipal government passed an ordinance requiring all buildings in the area to be built of 'fireproof' materials like brick and stone. Consequently, a new city centre rose from the ashes sporting brick buildings along broad avenues that would have looked more at home in a sedate and refined Victorian city than a rough-and-tumble frontier coal town. They were short-lived, however, as a second, larger inferno swept through the city on August 1, 1908. Whipped up by sudden winds, a nearby forest fire burnt its way into a lumber yard on the edge of the community and sparked a Dresden-style firestorm that melted brick and mortar and essentially erased the entire city in an afternoon. There were few casualties however and for a second time, a stately brick downtown core rose from the ashes. Today, these historic buildings, most of which still stand, are a treasured and distinctive feature of the community.

== Sports ==
Summer in Fernie is generally far quieter than the winter months, though mountain biking, fly fishing and golf are increasingly important tourist draws.

Club	League	Sport	Venue	Established	Championships
Fernie Ghostriders	KIJHL	Ice hockey	Fernie Memorial Arena	1991	3

=== Fernie Memorial Arena disaster ===
On October 17, 2017, there was an ammonia leak at the Fernie Memorial Arena which killed three workers (two City of Fernie employees and one CIMCO refrigeration employee from Calgary) during the Ghostriders' regular season. Because of this tragedy, the City of Fernie declared a state of emergency and people had to evacuate the area for days. The 'Riders were relocated because of this to the Elk Valley Leisure Centre in Sparwood, British Columbia during the 2017–18 KIJHL season until the City of Fernie decided what to do. The City of Fernie decided to replace ammonia for a synthetic refrigerant prior to the 2018–19 KIJHL season and moved the team back to the Fernie Memorial Arena.

== Notable people ==
The following people were born, raised in or reside in Fernie:

- Angie Abdou, Canadian fiction writer
- Emily Brydon, retired Olympic alpine skier
- Shane Churla, Stanley Cup finalist
- Albina Felski, Canadian–American self-taught folk artist
- James Gladstone, the first Status Indian to be appointed to the Senate of Canada
- Ivy Granstrom, blind Canadian Masters athlete
- George Wayne Haddad, Canadian politician and Fernie's past MLA
- Cal Hockley, retired gold medal winning hockey player
- Frank Hughes, retired NHL and WHA hockey player
- Craig Kelly, professional snowboarder
- Jason Krog, Stanley Cup finalist
- Florence Lassandro, Italian-Canadian bootlegger
- David LeNeveu, Stanley Cup finalist
- Alex Lifeson, guitarist of Rush
- Bill Lindsay, Stanley Cup finalist
- Eric Munn, sixth Bishop of Caledonia
- Emilio Picariello, Italian-Canadian bootlegger
- Danielle Poleschuk, Canadian freestyle skier
- Garth Rizzuto, retired NHL and WHA hockey player
- William Roderick Ross, Canadian politician and Fernie's MLA
- Darren Servatius, retired AAHL and ECHL defencemen
- Dan Smith, retired NHL hockey player
- Stanford Smith, Stanley Cup champion
- Alfred Stork, Canadian politician and Fernie's past mayor and MLA
- Tom Uphill, Canadian politician and Fernie's past mayor and MLA

== Local media ==
=== Newspapers ===
- e-know - East Kootenay news online weekly
- Fernie Fix - monthly glossy magazine
- The Free Press - weekly paper

=== Radio stations ===
- 107.9 FM - 2Day FM, modern adult contemporary
- 103.5 FM - CJAY 92, active rock
- 99.1 FM - The Drive, active rock
- 97.7 FM - CBC Radio One, public news/talk
- 92.7 FM - B104, country

=== Cable television ===
Rogers Communications operates a cable system serving Fernie. The cable system offers most major channels from Vancouver and Calgary, as well as local programming on Rogers TV channel 10.

== Schools and colleges ==
School District 5 Southeast Kootenay operates the following public schools in Fernie:

- Isabella Dicken Elementary School (Grades K-6)
- Fernie Secondary School (Grades 7-12)

The Conseil scolaire francophone de la Colombie-Britannique operates one Francophone school: école Sophie-Morigeau primary school.

Private schools:

- The Fernie Academy (Grades K-12)

Post-secondary:

- College of the Rockies

== Demographics ==
In the 2021 Census of Population conducted by Statistics Canada, Fernie had a population of 6,320 living in 2,597 of its 3,256 total private dwellings, a change of 17.1% from its 2016 population of 5,396. With a land area of 15.11 km^{2} (5.83 sq mi), it had a population density of 418.3/km^{2} (1,083.3/sq mi) in 2021.

=== Ethnicity ===
Panethnic groups in the City of Fernie (1986−2021)
Panethnic group	2021		2016		2011		2006		2001		1996		1991		1986	
Panethnic group	Pop.	%	Pop.	%	Pop.	%	Pop.	%	Pop.	%	Pop.	%	Pop.	%	Pop.	%
European (Note: Statistic includes all persons that did not make up part of a visible minority or an indigenous identity.)	5,465	88.43%	4,680	90.79%	4,030	92.43%	3,900	94.09%	4,265	93.74%	4,710	97.82%	4,660	94.24%	4,845	94.44%
Indigenous	270	4.37%	300	5.82%	200	4.59%	165	3.98%	145	3.19%	55	1.14%	220	4.45%	120	2.34%
East Asian (Note: Statistic includes total responses of "Chinese", "Korean", and "Japanese" under visible minority section on census.)	175	2.83%	55	1.07%	20	0.46%	65	1.57%	110	2.42%	40	0.83%	35	0.71%	55	1.07%
South Asian	115	1.86%	25	0.48%	0	0%	10	0.24%	25	0.55%	0	0%	30	0.61%	100	1.95%
Southeast Asian (Note: Statistic includes total responses of "Filipino" and "Southeast Asian" under visible minority section on census.)	95	1.54%	60	1.16%	0	0%	0	0%	0	0%	0	0%	0	0%	0	0%
Latin American	30	0.49%	25	0.48%	0	0%	0	0%	10	0.22%	0	0%	0	0%	10	0.19%
African	20	0.32%	0	0%	50	1.15%	0	0%	0	0%	0	0%	0	0%	0	0%
Middle Eastern (Note: Statistic includes total responses of "West Asian" and "Arab" under visible minority section on census.)	0	0%	0	0%	0	0%	0	0%	0	0%	10	0.21%	0	0%	0	0%
Other/multiracial (Note: Statistic includes total responses of "Visible minority, n.i.e." and "Multiple visible minorities" under visible minority section on census.)	0	0%	10	0.19%	0	0%	0	0%	0	0%	0	0%	—N/a	—N/a	—N/a	—N/a
Total responses	6,180	97.78%	5,155	95.53%	4,360	98.02%	4,145	98.29%	4,550	98.68%	4,815	98.31%	4,945	98.66%	5,130	98.88%
Total population	6,320	100%	5,396	100%	4,448	100%	4,217	100%	4,611	100%	4,898	100%	5,012	100%	5,188	100%
Note: Totals greater than 100% due to multiple origin responses.

=== Religion ===
According to the 2021 census, religious groups in Fernie included:

- Irreligion (4,005 persons or 64.9%)
- Christianity (2,010 persons or 32.6%)
- Hinduism (65 persons or 1.1%)
- Sikhism (35 persons or 0.6%)
- Buddhism (20 persons or 0.3%)
- Judaism (15 persons or 0.2%)
- Other (20 persons or 0.3%)

== Climate ==
Fernie has a cool and wet humid continental climate (Köppen Dfb) with warm summer days, cool summer nights along with cold and snowy winters. Influenced by chinook winds and being to the west of the continent, Fernie's winters are mild for its latitude in North America, although the climate is notably more continental than coastal British Columbia.

Climate data for Fernie
Month	Jan	Feb	Mar	Apr	May	Jun	Jul	Aug	Sep	Oct	Nov	Dec	Year
Record high °C (°F)	15.0 (59.0)	15.5 (59.9)	21.0 (69.8)	28.9 (84.0)	33.0 (91.4)	36.1 (97.0)	36.0 (96.8)	36.0 (96.8)	33.0 (91.4)	28.0 (82.4)	18.3 (64.9)	12.5 (54.5)	36.1 (97.0)
Mean daily maximum °C (°F)	−0.7 (30.7)	1.6 (34.9)	6.5 (43.7)	11.9 (53.4)	16.9 (62.4)	20.6 (69.1)	25.1 (77.2)	25.1 (77.2)	19.3 (66.7)	11.6 (52.9)	2.9 (37.2)	−1.9 (28.6)	11.6 (52.9)
Daily mean °C (°F)	−5.2 (22.6)	−3.8 (25.2)	0.8 (33.4)	5.4 (41.7)	9.9 (49.8)	13.6 (56.5)	16.8 (62.2)	16.3 (61.3)	11.3 (52.3)	5.5 (41.9)	−1.1 (30.0)	−6.1 (21.0)	5.3 (41.5)
Mean daily minimum °C (°F)	−9.6 (14.7)	−9.2 (15.4)	−4.9 (23.2)	−1.1 (30.0)	2.8 (37.0)	6.6 (43.9)	8.4 (47.1)	7.4 (45.3)	3.3 (37.9)	−0.7 (30.7)	−5.0 (23.0)	−10.1 (13.8)	−1.0 (30.2)
Record low °C (°F)	−39.4 (−38.9)	−40.0 (−40.0)	−32.8 (−27.0)	−20.0 (−4.0)	−11.0 (12.2)	−2.2 (28.0)	0.0 (32.0)	−2.0 (28.4)	−18.3 (−0.9)	−24.4 (−11.9)	−32.2 (−26.0)	−41.7 (−43.1)	−41.7 (−43.1)
Average precipitation mm (inches)	139.3 (5.48)	88.0 (3.46)	97.8 (3.85)	92.8 (3.65)	91.8 (3.61)	110.0 (4.33)	67.0 (2.64)	51.9 (2.04)	75.8 (2.98)	115.7 (4.56)	179.1 (7.05)	117.7 (4.63)	1,227.1 (48.31)
Average rainfall mm (inches)	55.8 (2.20)	41.5 (1.63)	60.6 (2.39)	80.0 (3.15)	88.8 (3.50)	109.8 (4.32)	67.0 (2.64)	51.9 (2.04)	75.4 (2.97)	109.4 (4.31)	123.0 (4.84)	39.0 (1.54)	902.2 (35.52)
Average snowfall cm (inches)	83.5 (32.9)	46.4 (18.3)	37.2 (14.6)	12.9 (5.1)	3.1 (1.2)	0.2 (0.1)	0.0 (0.0)	0.0 (0.0)	0.4 (0.2)	6.4 (2.5)	56.2 (22.1)	78.7 (31.0)	324.9 (127.9)
Average precipitation days (≥ 0.2 mm)	15.0	11.0	12.8	12.5	14.5	16.1	10.0	9.2	9.2	12.5	15.0	13.3	151.0
Average rainy days (≥ 0.2 mm)	4.9	4.4	8.6	11.2	14.2	16.1	10.0	9.2	9.2	11.7	9.2	3.6	112.1
Average snowy days (≥ 0.2 cm)	12.0	8.2	6.4	2.7	0.7	0.0	0.0	0.0	0.1	1.6	7.7	11.4	50.7

== See also ==
- Coal Creek, British Columbia, The Ghost Town
- Coal Creek (British Columbia), The Creek
- List of francophone communities in British Columbia
